= Binary compounds of silicon =

Any binary chemical compound containing just silicon and another chemical element

Experimental iron-silicon phase diagram

Binary compounds of silicon are binary chemical compounds containing silicon and one other chemical element. Technically the term silicide is reserved for any compounds containing silicon bonded to a more electropositive element. Binary silicon compounds can be grouped into several classes. Saltlike silicides are formed with the electropositive s-block metals. Covalent silicides and silicon compounds occur with hydrogen and the elements in groups 10 to 17.

Transition metals form metallic silicides, with the exceptions of silver, gold and the group 12 elements. The general composition is M_{n}Si or MSi_{n} with n ranging from 1 to 6 and M standing for metal. Examples are M_{5}Si, M_{3}Si (Cu, V, Cr, Mo, Mn, Fe, Pt, U), M_{2}Si (Zr, Hf, Ta, Ir, Ru, Rh, Co, Ni, Ce), M_{3}Si_{2} (Hf, Th, U), MSi (Ti, Zr, Hf, Fe, Ce, Th, Pu) and MSi_{2} (Ti, V, Nb, Ta, Cr, Mo, W, Re).

The Kopp–Neumann law applies; heat capacities are linear in the proportion of silicon:
$$C_p(\ce{M_{x}Si_{y}})=x\cdot C_p(\ce{M})+y\cdot C_p(\ce{Si})$$

As a general rule, nonstochiometry implies instability. These intermetallics are in general resistant to hydrolysis, brittle, and melt at a lower temperature than the corresponding carbides or borides. They are electrical conductors. However, some, such as CrSi_{2}, Mg_{2}Si, β-FeSi_{2} and MnSi_{1.7}, are semiconductors. Since degenerate semiconductors exhibit some metallic properties, such as luster and electrical conductivity which decreases with temperature, some silicides classified as metals may be semiconductors.

== Group 1 ==
Silicides of group 1 elements are saltlike silicides. In general, they melt at high temperatures, appear metallic grey, conduct electricity moderately to poor, and are prepared by heating the elements. The major exception are the silanes, silicon-hydrogen compounds whose bonds are covalent. The parent, silane, is SiH_{4}; higher homologues are disilane (Si_{2}H_{6}) and trisilane (Si_{3}H_{8}). Polysilicon hydride is a two-dimensional polymer network.

At the atomic level, group 1 silicides typically form cluster compounds. Several silicon phases include the Zintl ions (Si^{4−}_{4}, Si^{4−}_{9}, Si^{2−}_{5}). Li_{12}Si_{7} has a Zintl phase with planar Si_{5}^{6−} rings, and Li NMR spectroscopy suggests these rings are aromatic.

Lithium silicides include Li_{13}Si_{4}, Li_{22}Si_{5}, Li_{7}Si_{3} and Li_{12}Si_{7}. Li_{4.4}Si is prepared from silicon and lithium metal in high-energy Ball mill process. One potential use is lithium battery electrodes.

Sodium silicide can be represented by NaSi, NaSi_{2} and Na_{11}Si_{36}, and potassium silicide by K_{8}Si_{46}.

== Group 2 ==
Silicides of group 2 elements are also saltlike silicides except for beryllium whose phase diagram with silicon is a simple eutectic (1085 °C @ 60% by weight silicon). Again there is variation in composition: magnesium silicide is represented by Mg_{2}Si, calcium silicide can be represented by Ca_{2}Si, CaSi, CaSi_{2}, Ca_{5}Si_{3} and by Ca_{14}Si_{19}, strontium silicide can be represented by Sr_{2}Si, SrSi_{2} and Sr_{5}Si_{3} and barium silicide can be represented by Ba_{2}Si, BaSi_{2}, Ba_{5}Si_{3} and Ba_{3}Si_{4}. Superconducting properties have been reported for Ba_{8}Si_{46}. Mg_{2}Si, and its solid solutions with Mg_{2}Ge and Mg_{2}Sn, are good thermoelectric materials and their figure of merit values are comparable with those of established materials.

== Transition and inner transition metals ==
The transition metals form a wide range of silicon intermetallics with at least one binary crystalline phase. Some exceptions exist. Gold forms a eutectic at 363 °C with 2.3% silicon by weight (18% atom percent) without mutual solubility in the solid state. Silver forms another eutectic at 835 °C with 11% silicon by weight, again with negligible mutual solid state solubility. In group 12 all elements form a eutectic close to the metal melting point without mutual solid-state solubility: zinc at 419 °C and > 99 atom percent zinc and cadmium at 320 °C (< 99% Cd).

Commercially relevant intermetallics are group 6 molybdenum disilicide, a commercial ceramic mostly used as a heating element. Tungsten disilicide is also a commercially available ceramic with uses in microelectronics. Platinum silicide is a semiconductor material. Ferrosilicon is an iron alloy that also contains some calcium and aluminium.

MnSi, known as brownleeite, can be found in outer space. Several Mn silicides form a Nowotny phase. Nanowires based on silicon and manganese can be synthesised from Mn(CO)_{5}SiCl_{3} forming nanowires based on Mn_{19}Si_{33}. or grown on a silicon surface MnSi_{1.73} was investigated as thermoelectric material and as an optoelectronic thin film. Single-crystal MnSi_{1.73} can form from a tin-lead melt

In the frontiers of technological research, iron disilicide is becoming more and more relevant to optoelectronics, specially in its crystalline form β-FeSi_{2}. They are used as thin films or as nanoparticles, obtained by means of epitaxial growth on a silicon substrate.

Atomic number	Name	Symbol	Group	Period	Block	Phases
21	Scandium	Sc	3	4	d	Sc_{5}Si_{3}, ScSi, Sc_{2}Si_{3},
22	Titanium	Ti	4	4	d	Ti_{5}Si_{3}, TiSi, TiSi_{2}, TiSi_{3}, Ti_{6}Si_{4}
23	Vanadium	V	5	4	d	V_{3}Si, V_{5}Si_{3}, V_{6}Si_{5}, VSi_{2}, V_{6}Si_{5}
24	Chromium	Cr	6	4	d	Cr_{3}Si, Cr_{5}Si_{3}, CrSi, CrSi_{2}
25	Manganese	Mn	7	4	d	MnSi, Mn_{9}Si_{2}, Mn_{3}Si, Mn_{5}Si_{3}, Mn_{11}Si_{9}
26	Iron	Fe	8	4	d	FeSi_{2}, FeSi Fe_{5}Si_{3}, Fe_{2}Si, Fe_{3}Si
27	Cobalt	Co	9	4	d	CoSi, CoSi_{2}, Co_{2}Si, Co_{2}Si, Co_{3}Si
28	Nickel	Ni	10	4	d	Ni_{3}Si, Ni_{31}Si_{12}, Ni_{2}Si, Ni_{3}Si_{2}, NiSi (Nickel monosilicide), NiSi_{2}
29	Copper	Cu	11	4	d	Cu_{17}Si_{3}, Cu_{56}Si_{11},Cu_{5}Si, Cu_{33}Si_{7}, Cu_{4}Si, Cu_{19}Si_{6},Cu_{3}Si,Cu_{87}Si_{13}
30	Zinc	Zn	12	4	d	eutectic
39	Yttrium	Y	3	4	d	Y_{5}Si_{3}, Y_{5}Si_{4}, YSi, Y_{3}Si_{5}, YSi_{1.4}.
40	Zirconium	Zr	4	5	d	Zr_{5}Si_{3}, Zr_{5}Si_{4}, ZrSi, ZrSi_{2}, Zr_{3}Si_{2}, Zr_{2}Si, Zr_{3}Si
41	Niobium	Nb	5	5	d	Nb_{5}Si_{3}, Nb_{4}Si
42	Molybdenum	Mo	6	5	d	Mo_{3}Si, Mo_{5}Si_{3}, MoSi_{2}
43	Technetium	Tc	7	5	d	Tc_{4}Si_{7} (proposed)
44	Ruthenium	Ru	8	5	d	Ru_{2}Si, Ru_{4}Si_{3}, RuSi, Ru_{2}Si_{3}
45	Rhodium	Rh	9	5	d	RhSi, Rh_{2}Si, Rh_{5}Si_{3}, Rh_{3}Si_{2}, Rh_{20}Si_{13}
46	Palladium	Pd	10	5	d	Pd_{5}Si, Pd_{9}Si_{2}, Pd_{3}Si, Pd_{2}Si, PdSi
47	Silver	Ag	11	5	d	eutectic
48	Cadmium	Cd	12	5	d	eutectic
57	Lanthanum	La		6	f	La_{5}Si_{3}, La_{3}Si_{2}, La_{5}Si_{4}, LaSi, LaSi_{2}
58	Cerium	Ce		6	f	Ce_{5}Si_{3}, Ce_{3}Si_{2}, Ce_{5}Si_{4}, CeSi, Ce_{3}Si_{5}, CeSi_{2}
59	Praseodymium	Pr		6	f	Pr_{5}Si_{3}, Pr_{3}Si_{2}, Pr_{5}Si_{4}, PrSi, PrSi_{2}
60	Neodymium	Nd		6	f	Nd_{5}Si_{3}, Nd_{5}Si_{4}, Nd_{5}Si_{3},NdSi, Nd_{3}Si_{4}, Nd_{2}Si_{3}, NdSi_{x}
61	Promethium	Pm		6	f	
62	Samarium	Sm		6	f	Sm_{5}Si_{4}, Sm_{5}Si_{3}, SmSi, Sm_{3}Si_{5}, SmSi_{2}
63	Europium	Eu		6	f	
64	Gadolinium	Gd		6	f	Gd_{5}Si_{3}, Gd_{5}Si_{4}, GdSi, GdSi_{2}
65	Terbium	Tb		6	f	Si_{2}Tb (terbium silicide), SiTb, Si_{4}Tb_{5}, Si_{3}Tb_{5}
66	Dysprosium	Dy		6	f	Dy_{5}Si_{5}, DySi, DySi_{2}
67	Holmium	Ho		6	f	Ho_{5}Si_{3},Ho_{5}Si_{4},HoSi,Ho_{4}Si_{5},HoSi_{2}
68	Erbium	Er		6	f	Er_{5}Si_{3}, Er_{5}Si_{4}, ErSi, ErSi_{2}
69	Thulium	Tm		6	f	
70	Ytterbium	Yb		6	f	Si_{1.8}Yb,Si_{5}Yb_{3},Si_{4}Yb_{3}, SiYb, Si_{4}Yb_{5}, Si_{3}Yb_{5}
71	Lutetium	Lu	3	6	d	Lu_{5}Si_{3}
72	Hafnium	Hf	4	6	d	Hf_{2}Si, Hf_{3}Si_{2}, HfSi, Hf_{5}Si_{4}, HfSi_{2}
73	Tantalum	Ta	5	6	d	Ta_{9}Si_{2}, Ta_{3}Si, Ta_{5}Si_{3}
74	Tungsten	W	6	6	d	W_{5}Si_{3}, WSi_{2}
75	Rhenium	Re	7	6	d	Re_{2}Si, ReSi, ReSi_{1.8} Re_{5}Si_{3}
76	Osmium	Os	8	6	d	OsSi, Os_{2}Si_{3}, OsSi_{2}
77	Iridium	Ir	9	6	d	IrSi, Ir_{4}Si_{5}, Ir_{3}Si_{4}, Ir_{3}Si_{5}, IrSi_{3}. Ir_{2}Si_{3}, Ir_{4}Si_{7}, IrSi_{2}
78	Platinum	Pt	10	6	d	Pt_{25}Si_{7}, Pt_{17}Si_{8}, Pt_{6}Si_{5}, Pt_{5}Si_{2}, Pt_{3}Si, Pt_{2}Si, PtSi
79	Gold	Au	11	6	d	Eutectic diagram at link
80	Mercury	Hg	12	6	d	eutectic
89	Actinium	Ac		7	f	
90	Thorium	Th		7	f	Th_{3}Si_{2}, ThSi, Th_{3}Si_{5}, and ThSi_{2−x}
91	Protactinium	Pa		7	f	
92	Uranium	U		7	f	U_{3}Si, U_{3}Si_{2}, USi, U_{3}Si_{5}, USi_{2−x}, USi_{2} and USi_{3}
93	Neptunium	Np		7	f	NpSi_{3}, Np_{3}Si_{2}, and NpSi
94	Plutonium	Pu		7	f	Pu_{5}Si_{3}, Pu_{3}Si_{2}, PuSi, Pu_{3}Si_{5} and PuSi_{2}
95	Americium	Am		7	f	AmSi, AmSi_{2}
96	Curium	Cm		7	f	CmSi, Cm_{2}Si_{3}, CmSi_{2}
97	Berkelium	Bk		7	f	
98	Californium	Cf		7	f	
99	Einsteinium	Es		7	f	
100	Fermium	Fm		7	f	
101	Mendelevium	Md		7	f	
102	Nobelium	No		7	f	
103	Lawrencium	Lr	3	7	d	
104	Rutherfordium	Rf	4	7	d	
105	Dubnium	Db	5	7	d	
106	Seaborgium	Sg	6	7	d	
107	Bohrium	Bh	7	7	d	
108	Hassium	Hs	8	7	d	
109	Meitnerium	Mt	9	7	d	
110	Darmstadtium	Ds	10	7	d	
111	Roentgenium	Rg	11	7	d	
112	Copernicium	Cn	12	7	d	

== Group 13 ==
In group 13 boron (a metalloid) forms several binary crystalline silicon boride compounds: SiB_{3}, SiB_{6}, SiB_{n}. With aluminium, a post-transition metal, a eutectic is formed (577 °C @ 12.2 atom % Al) with maximum solubility of silicon in solid aluminium of 1.5%. Commercially relevant aluminium alloys containing silicon have at least element added. Gallium, also a post-transition metal, forms a eutectic at 29 °C with 99.99% Ga without mutual solid-state solubility; indium and thallium behave similarly.

== Group 14 ==
Silicon carbide (SiC) is widely used as a ceramic or example in car brakes and bulletproof vests. It is also used in semiconductor electronics. It is manufactured from silicon dioxide and carbon in an Acheson furnace between 1600 and 2500 °C. There are 250 known crystalline forms with alpha silicon carbide the most common. Silicon itself is an important semiconductor material used in microchips. It is produced commercially from silica and carbon at 1900 °C and crystallizes in a diamond cubic crystal structure. Germanium silicide forms a solid solution and is again a commercially used semiconductor material. The tin–silicon phase diagram is a eutectic and the lead–silicon phase diagram shows a monotectic transition and a small eutectic transition but no solid solubility.

== Group 15 ==
Silicon nitride (Si_{3}N_{4}) is a ceramic with many commercial high-temperature applications such as engine parts. It can be synthesized from the elements at temperatures between 1300 and 1400 °C. Three different crystallographic forms exist. Other binary silicon nitrogen compounds have been proposed (SiN, Si_{2}N_{3}, Si_{3}N) and other SiN compounds have been investigated at cryogenic temperatures (SiN_{2}, Si(N_{2})_{2}, SiNNSi). Silicon tetraazide is an unstable compound that easily detonates.

The phase diagram with phosphorus shows SiP and SiP_{2}. A reported silicon phosphide is Si_{12}P_{5} (no practical applications), formed by annealing an amorphous Si-P alloy.

The arsenic–silicon phase diagram measured at 40 Bar has two phases: SiAs and SiAs_{2}. The antimony–silicon system comprises a single eutectic close to the melting point of Sb. The bismuth system is a monotectic.

== Group 16 ==
In group 16 silicon dioxide is a very common compound that widely occurs as sand or quartz. SiO_{2} is tetrahedral with each silicon atom surrounded by 4 oxygen atoms. Numerous crystalline forms exist with the tetrahedra linked to form a polymeric chain. Examples are tridymite and cristobalite. A less common oxide is silicon monoxide that can be found in outer space. Unconfirmed reports exist for nonequilibrium Si_{2}O, Si_{3}O_{2}, Si_{3}O_{4}, Si_{2}O_{3} and Si_{3}O_{5}. Silicon sulfide is also a chain compound. Cyclic SiS_{2} has been reported to exist in the gas phase. The phase diagram of silicon with selenium has two phases: SiSe_{2} and SiSe. Tellurium silicide is a semiconductor with formula TeSi_{2} or Te_{2}Si_{3}.

== Group 17 ==
Binary silicon compounds in group 17 are stable compounds ranging from gaseous silicon fluoride (SiF_{4}) to the liquids silicon chloride (SiCl_{4} and silicon bromide SiBr_{4}) to the solid silicon iodide (SiI_{4}). The molecular geometry in these compounds is tetrahedral and the bonding mode covalent. Other known stable fluorides in this group are Si_{2}F_{6}, Si_{3}F_{8} (liquid) and polymeric solids known as polysilicon fluorides (SiF_{2})_{x} and (SiF)_{x}. The other halides form similar binary silicon compounds.

== The periodic table of the binary silicon compounds ==
SiH_{4}																	He
LiSi	Be											SiB_{3}	SiC	Si_{3}N_{4}	SiO_{2}	SiF_{4}	Ne
NaSi	Mg_{2}Si											Al	Si	SiP	SiS_{2}	SiCl_{4}	Ar
KSi	CaSi_{2}	ScSi	TiSi	V_{5}Si_{3}	Cr_{5}Si_{3}	MnSi	FeSi	CoSi	NiSi	Cu_{5}Si	Zn	Ga	Si_{1−x}Ge_{x}	SiAs	SiSe_{2}	SiBr_{4}	Kr
RbSi	Sr_{2}Si	YSi	ZrSi	Nb_{5}Si_{3}	Mo_{5}Si_{3}	Tc	RuSi	RhSi	PdSi	Ag	Cd	In	Sn	Sb	TeSi_{2}	SiI_{4}	Xe
CsSi	Ba_{2}Si	LuSi	HfSi	Ta_{5}Si_{3}	W_{5}Si_{3}	ReSi_{2}	OsSi	IrSi	PtSi	Au	Hg	Tl	Pb	Bi	Po	At	Rn
Fr	Ra	Lr	Rf	Db	Sg	Bh	Hs	Mt	Ds	Rg	Cn	Nh	Fl	Mc	Lv	Ts	Og
		↓															
		LaSi	CeSi	PrSi	NdSi	Pm	SmSi	EuSi	GdSi	TbSi	DySi	HoSi	ErSi	Tm	YbSi		
		Ac	ThSi	Pa	USi	NpSi	PuSi	AmSi	CmSi	Bk	Cf	Es	Fm	Md	No		

Binary compounds of silicon
Covalent silicon compounds	metallic silicides.
Ionic silicides	Do not exist
Eutectic / monotectic / solid solution	Unknown / Not assessed
