= Phase curve (astronomy) =

Description of an astronomical object's brightness as a function of phase angle

In astronomy, a phase curve describes the brightness of a reflecting body as a function of its phase angle (the arc subtended by the observer and the Sun as measured at the body). The brightness usually refers the object's absolute magnitude, which, in turn, is its apparent magnitude at a distance of one astronomical unit from the Earth and Sun.

The phase curve is useful for characterizing an object's regolith (soil) and atmosphere. It is also the basis for computing the geometrical albedo and the Bond albedo of the body. In ephemeris generation, the phase curve is used in conjunction with the distances from the object to the Sun and the Earth to calculate the apparent magnitude.

== Mercury ==
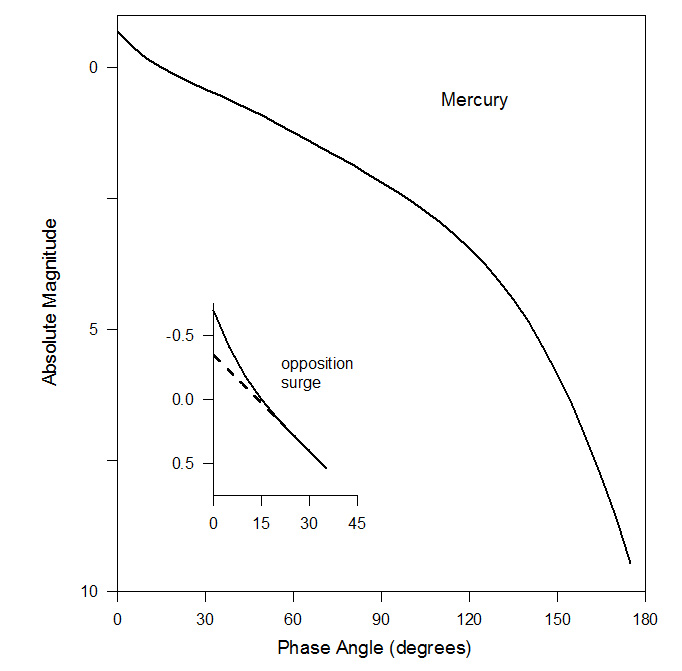
The phase curve of Mercury and its opposition surge.

The phase curve of Mercury is very steep, which is characteristic of a body on which bare regolith (soil) is exposed to view. At phase angles exceeding 90° (crescent phase) the brightness falls off especially sharply. The shape of the phase curve indicates a mean slope on the surface of Mercury of about 16°, which is slightly smoother than that of the Moon. Approaching phase angle 0° (fully illuminated phase) the curve rises to a sharp peak. This surge in brightness is called the opposition effect because for most bodies (though not Mercury) it occurs at astronomical opposition when the body is opposite from the Sun in the sky. The width of the opposition surge for Mercury indicates that both the compaction state of the regolith and the distribution of particle sizes on the planet are similar to those on the Moon.

Early visual observations contributing to the phase curve of Mercury were obtained by G. Muller in the 1800s and by André-Louis Danjon in the mid-twentieth century. W. Irvine and colleagues used photoelectric photometry in the 1960s. Some of these early data were analyzed by G. de Vaucouleurs, summarized by D. Harris and used for predicting apparent magnitudes in the Astronomical Almanac for several decades. Highly accurate new observations covering the widest range of phase angles to date (2 to 170°) were carried out by A. Mallama, D. Wang and R. Howard using the Large Angle and Spectrometric Coronograph (LASCO) on the Solar and Heliospheric Observatory (SOHO) satellite. They also obtained new CCD observations from the ground. These data are now the major source of the phase curve used in the Astronomical Almanac for predicting apparent magnitudes.

The apparent brightness of Mercury as seen from Earth is greatest at phase angle 0° (superior conjunction with the Sun) when it can reach magnitude −2.6. At phase angles approaching 180° (inferior conjunction) the planet fades to about magnitude +5 with the exact brightness depending on the phase angle at that particular conjunction. This difference of more than 7 magnitudes corresponds to a change of over a thousand times in apparent brightness.

== Venus ==
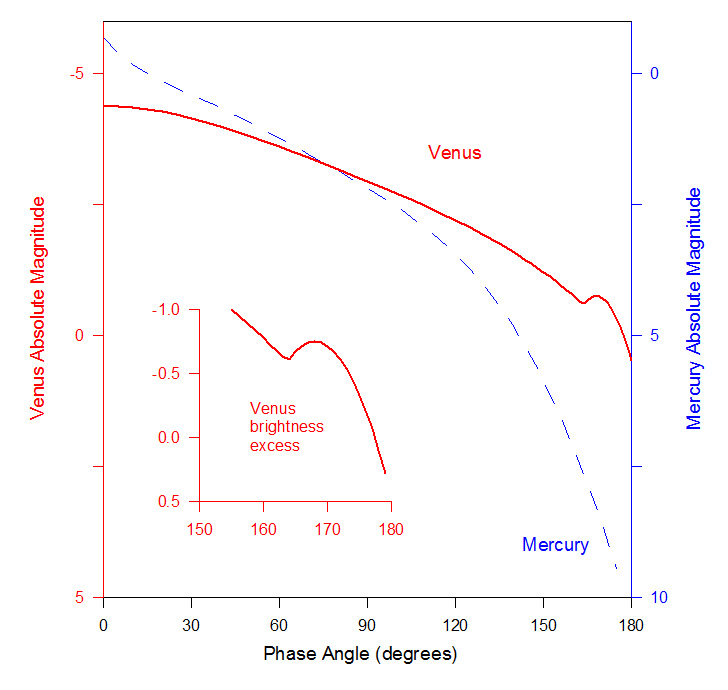
The phase curve of Venus compared to Mercury, and the brightness excess of Venus.

The relatively flat phase curve of Venus is characteristic of a cloudy planet. In contrast to Mercury where the curve is strongly peaked approaching phase angle zero (full phase) that of Venus is rounded. The wide illumination scattering angle of clouds, as opposed to the narrower scattering of regolith, causes this flattening of the phase curve. Venus exhibits a brightness surge near phase angle 170°, when it is a thin crescent, due to forward scattering of sunlight by droplets of sulfuric acid that are above the planet's cloud tops. Even beyond 170° the brightness does not decline very steeply.

The history of observation and analysis of the phase curve of Venus is similar to that of Mercury. The best set of modern observations and interpretation was reported by A. Mallama, D. Wang and R. Howard. They used the LASCO instrument on SOHO and ground-based, CCD equipment to observe the phase curve from 2 to 179°. As with Mercury, these new data are the major source of the phase curve used in the Astronomical Almanac for predicting apparent magnitudes.

In contrast to Mercury the maximal apparent brightness of Venus as seen from Earth does not occur at phase angle zero. Since the phase curve of Venus is relatively flat while its distance from the Earth can vary greatly, maximum brightness occurs when the planet is a crescent, at phase angle 125°, at which time Venus can be as bright as magnitude −4.9. Near inferior conjunction the planet typically fades to about magnitude −3 although the exact value depends on the phase angle. The typical range in apparent brightness for Venus over the course of one apparition is less than a factor of 10 or merely 1% that of Mercury.

== Earth ==
The phase curve of the Earth has not been determined as accurately as those for Mercury and Venus because its integrated brightness is difficult to measure from the surface. Instead of direct observation, earthshine reflected from the portion of the Moon not lit by the Sun has served as a proxy. A few direct measurements of the Earth's luminosity have been obtained with the EPOXI spacecraft. While they do not cover much of the phase curve they reveal a rotational light curve caused by the transit of dark oceans and bright land masses across the hemisphere. P. Goode and colleagues at Big Bear Solar Observatory have measured the earthshine and T. Livengood of NASA analyzed the EPOXI data.

Earth as seen from Venus near opposition from the Sun would be extremely bright at magnitude −6. To an observer outside the Earth's orbit on Mars our planet would appear most luminous near the time of its greatest elongation from the Sun, at about magnitude −1.5.

== Mars ==
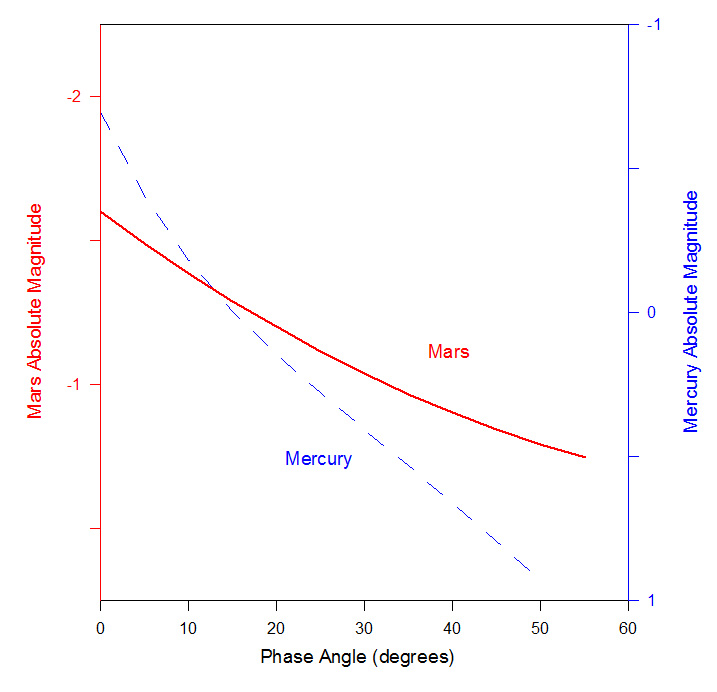
The phase curve of Mars compared to Mercury.

Since it orbits further from the Sun only about half of the Martian phase curve can be observed from Earth. There is an opposition surge but it is less pronounced than that of Mercury. The rotation of bright and dark surface markings across its disk and variability of its atmospheric state (including its dust storms) superimpose variations on the phase curve. R. Schmude obtained many of the Mars brightness measurements used in a comprehensive phase curve analysis performed by A. Mallama.

Because the orbit of Mars is considerably eccentric its brightness at opposition can range from magnitude −3.0 to −1.4. The minimum brightness is about magnitude +1.6 when Mars is on the opposite site of the Sun from the Earth. Rotational variations can elevate or suppress the brightness of Mars by 5% and global dust storms can increase its luminosity by 25%.

== Giant planets ==
The outermost planets (Jupiter, Saturn, Uranus, and Neptune) are so distant that only small portions of their phase curves near 0° (full phase) can be evaluated from the Earth. That part of the curve is generally fairly flat, like that of Venus, for these cloudy planets.

The apparent magnitude of Jupiter ranges from −2.9 to −1.4, Saturn from −0.5 to +1.4, Uranus from +5.3 to +6.0, and Neptune from +7.8 to +8.0. Most of these variations are due to distance. However, the magnitude range for Saturn also depends on its ring system as explained below.

== The rings of Saturn ==
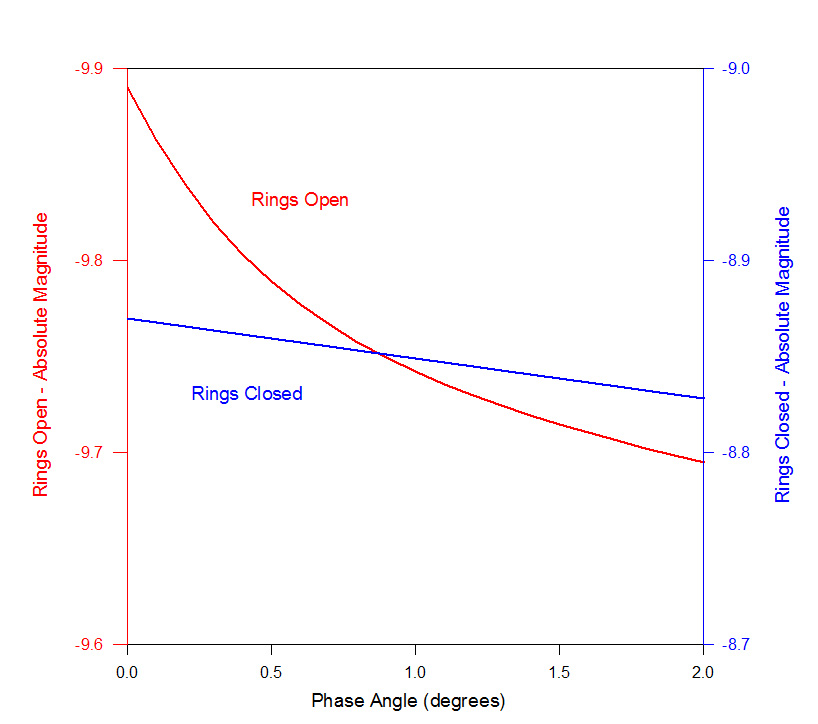
The phase curve of Saturn, according to Schmude demonstrating the opposition effect of the ring system.

The brightness of the Saturn system depends on the orientation of its ring system. The rings contribute more to the overall brightness of the system when they are more inclined to the direction of illumination from the Sun and to the view of the observer. Wide open rings contribute about one magnitude of brightness to the disk alone. The icy particles that compose the rings also produce a strong opposition surge. Hubble Space Telescope and Cassini spacecraft images have been analyzed in an attempt to characterize the ring particles based on their phase curves.

== The Moon ==
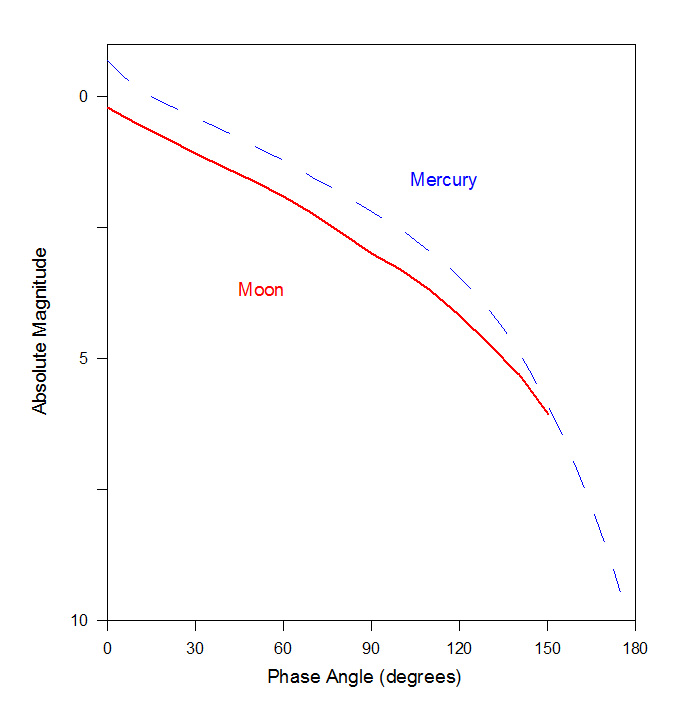
The phase curve of the Moon compared to Mercury.

The phase curve of the Moon approximately resembles that of Mercury due to the similarities of the surfaces and the lack of an atmosphere on either body. Clementine spacecraft data analyzed by J. Hillier, B. Buratti and K. Hill indicate a lunar opposition surge. The Moon's apparent magnitude at full phase is −12.7 while at quarter phase it is 21 percent as bright.

== Planetary satellites ==
The phase curves of many natural satellites of other planets have been observed and interpreted. The icy moons often exhibit opposition brightness surges. This behavior has been used to model their surfaces.

== Asteroids ==
The phase curves of many asteroids have also been observed and they too may exhibit opposition surges. Asteroids can be physically classified in this way. The effects of rotation can be very large and have to be factored in before the phase curve is computed. An example of such a study is reported by R. Baker and colleagues.

== Exoplanets ==
Programs for characterizing planets outside of the Solar System depend largely on spectroscopy to identify atmospheric constituents and states, especially those that point to the presence of life forms or which could support life. However, brightness can be measured for very distant Earth-sized objects that are too faint for spectroscopic analysis. A. Mallama has demonstrated that phase curve analysis may be a useful tool for identifying planets that are Earth-like. Additionally, J. Bailey has pointed out that phase curve anomalies such as the brightness excess of Venus could be useful indicators of atmospheric constituents such as water, which might be essential to life in the universe.

== Criticisms on phase curve modelling ==
Inferences about regoliths from phase curves are frequently based on Hapke parameterization. However, in a blind test M. Shepard and P. Helfenstein found no strong evidence that a particular set of Hapke parameters derived from photometric data could uniquely reveal the physical state of laboratory samples. These tests included modeling the three-term Henyey-Greenstein phase functions and the coherent backscatter opposition effect. This negative finding suggests that the radiative transfer model developed by B. Hapke may be inadequate for physical modeling based on photometry.

However the use of Bayesian Monte-Carlo approach ensure the derivation of the full set of solutions and allows to retrieve parameter identical to in-situ measurement. From this analysis, the surface microtexture can be determined remotely, on Mars, Europa moon and other bodies.
