= Cobalt silicide =

Cobalt silicide may refer to the following chemical compounds:

- Dicobalt silicide, Co_{2}Si
- Cobalt monosilicide, CoSi
- Cobalt disilicide, CoSi_{2}
