= Diiron silicide =

Names
- IUPAC name Diiron silicide

Identifiers
3D model (JSmol)	Interactive image
PubChem CID	24945630
- InChI: InChI=1S/2Fe.Si Key: JQEFXLZKSTUUEC-UHFFFAOYSA-N
- SMILES: [Si].[Fe].[Fe]

Properties
Chemical formula	Fe_{2}Si
Molar mass	139.78 g/mol

Structure
Crystal structure	Trigonal (Ni_{2}Al-type)
Space group	P3̅m1 (No. 161), hP6
Lattice constant	a = 0.281 nm, b = 0.281 nm, c = 0.281 nm
Formula units (Z)	1

Hazards
Flash point	Non-flammable

Related compounds
Other cations	Dicobalt silicide
- Except where otherwise noted, data are given for materials in their standard state (at 25 °C [77 °F], 100 kPa). (what is ?) Infobox references

Diiron silicide (Fe_{2}Si) is an intermetallic compound, a silicide of iron. It occurs in cosmic dust as the mineral hapkeite. It is a non-stoichiometric compound where the Fe:Si ratio depends on the sample preparation. A related compound Fe_{5}Si_{3} occurs in nature as the mineral xifengite.

== See also ==
- Ferrosilicon
