= Manganese silicide =

Manganese silicide may refer to the following chemical compounds:

- Manganese monosilicide, MnSi
- Manganese disilicide, MnSi_{2}
- Mavlyanovite, Mn_{5}Si_{3}
