= Policide (disambiguation) =

Policide may refer to:

- Policide, political science term
- Policide (engineering), chemical engineering term

== See also ==
- Definitions of politicide
