= Fesi =

Fesi or FeSi may refer to

- Eden Fesi, a fictional, mutant superhero appearing in Marvel Comics
- Mike Fesi (born 1959), American politician and businessman
- Iron monosilicide, a chemical compound with the formula FeSi
- Naquite, a mineral with the chemical formula FeSi
