= Nickel silicide =

Ni_{2}Si
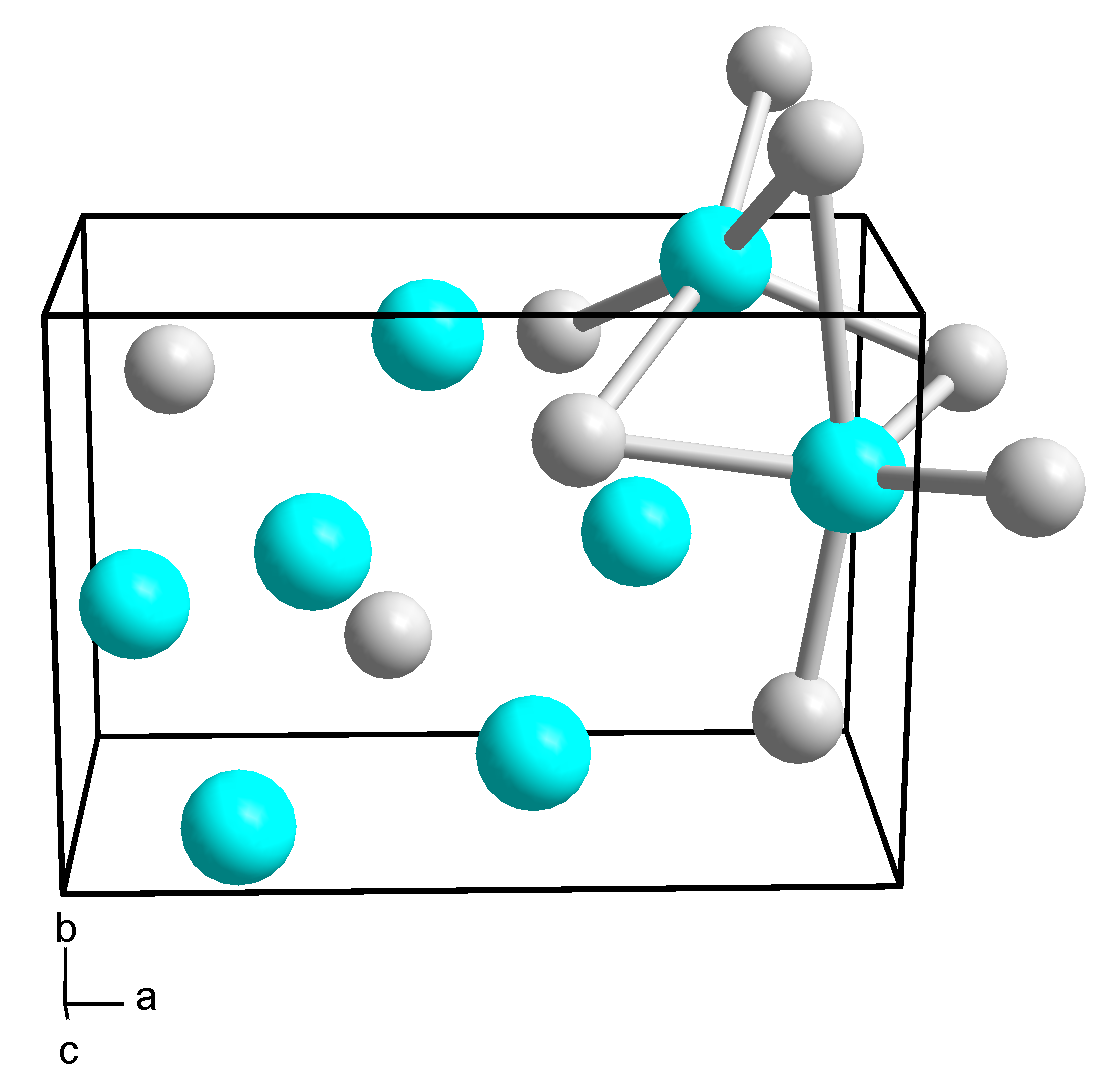

Identifiers
CAS Number	12059-14-2
3D model (JSmol)	Interactive image
ChemSpider	21241520
EC Number	235-033-1
PubChem CID	14767304
- InChI: InChI=1S/2Ni.Si Key: RUFLMLWJRZAWLJ-UHFFFAOYSA-N
- SMILES: [Si](=[Ni])=[Ni]

Properties
Chemical formula	Ni_{2}Si
Molar mass	145.473 g/mol
Density	7.40 g/cm^{3}
Melting point	1,255 °C (2,291 °F; 1,528 K)

Structure
Crystal structure	Orthorhombic, oP12
Space group	Pnma, No. 62
Lattice constant	a = 0.502 nm, b = 0.374 nm, c = 0.708 nm
Formula units (Z)	4
- Except where otherwise noted, data are given for materials in their standard state (at 25 °C [77 °F], 100 kPa). Infobox references

NiSi
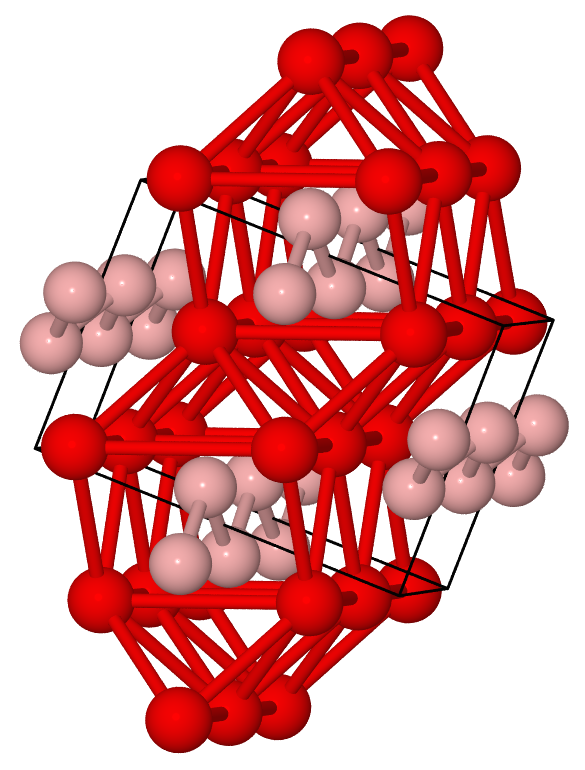

Identifiers
CAS Number	12035-57-3
3D model (JSmol)	Interactive image
ChemSpider	8351596
PubChem CID	10176091
- InChI: InChI=1S/Ni.Si Key: PEUPIGGLJVUNEU-UHFFFAOYSA-N
- SMILES: [Si].[Ni]

Properties
Chemical formula	NiSi
Molar mass	86.778 g/mol

Structure
Crystal structure	Orthorphomic, oP8
Space group	Pnma, No. 62
Lattice constant	a = 0.519 nm, b = 0.333 nm, c = 0.5628 nm
Formula units (Z)	4
- Except where otherwise noted, data are given for materials in their standard state (at 25 °C [77 °F], 100 kPa). Infobox references

NiSi_{2}
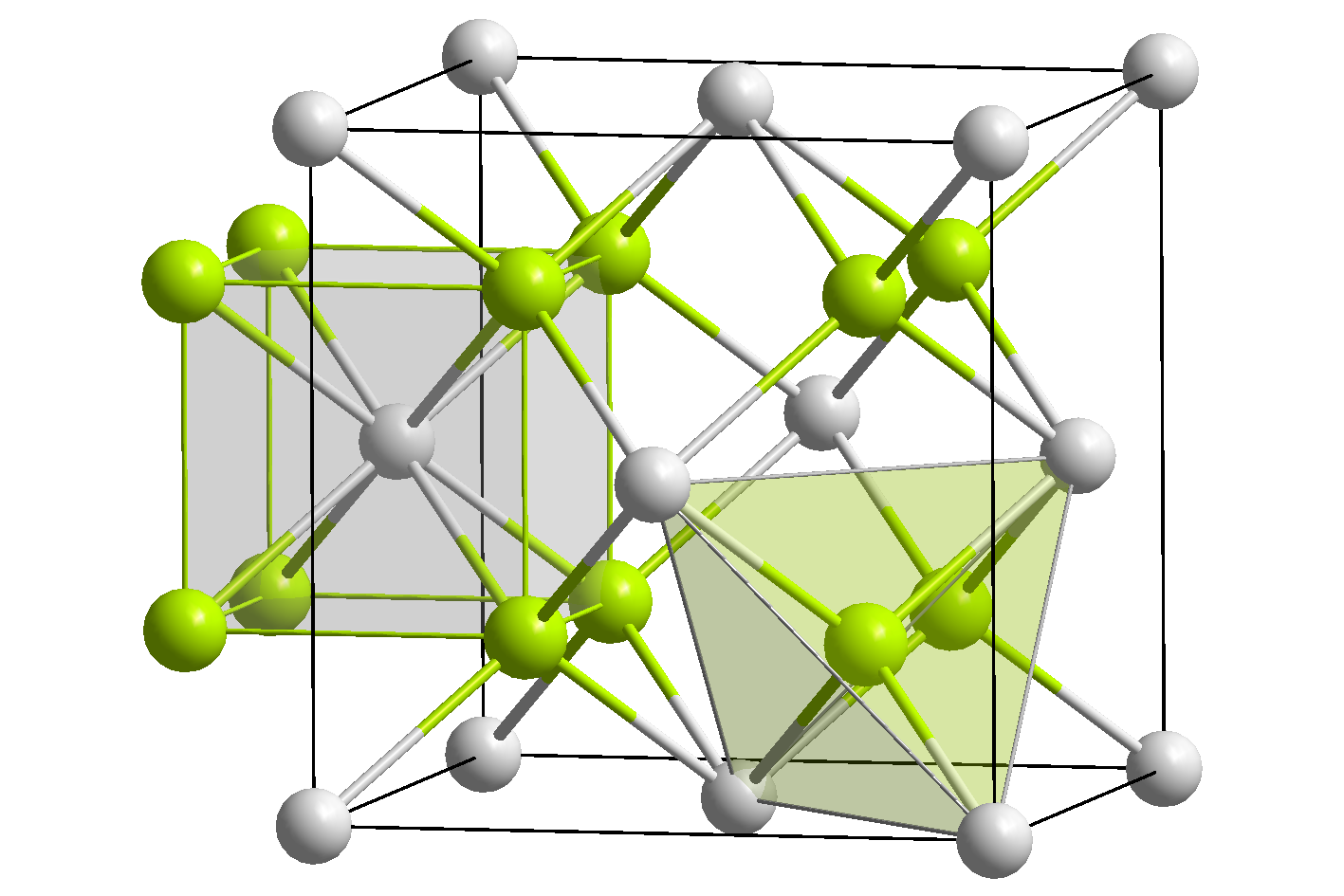

Identifiers
CAS Number	12201-89-7
3D model (JSmol)	Interactive image
CompTox Dashboard (EPA)	DTXSID401014290
- InChI: InChI=1S/Ni.2Si Key: MGTLYUZSHHQPEY-UHFFFAOYSA-N
- SMILES: [Ni].[Si].[Si]

Properties
Chemical formula	NiSi_{2}
Molar mass	114.864 g/mol
Density	7.83 g/cm^{3}
Melting point	993 °C (1,819 °F; 1,266 K)

Structure
Crystal structure	Cubic, cF12
Space group	Fm3̅m, No. 225
Lattice constant	a = 0.5406 nm
Formula units (Z)	4
- Except where otherwise noted, data are given for materials in their standard state (at 25 °C [77 °F], 100 kPa). Infobox references

Nickel silicides include several intermetallic compounds of nickel and silicon. Nickel silicides are important in microelectronics as they form at junctions of nickel and silicon. Additionally thin layers of nickel silicides may have application in imparting surface resistance to nickel alloys.

== Compounds ==
Nickel silicides include Ni_{3}Si, Ni_{31}Si_{12}, Ni_{2}Si, Ni_{3}Si_{2}, NiSi and NiSi_{2}. Ni_{31}Si_{12}, Ni_{2}Si, and NiSi have congruent melting points; the others form via a peritectic transformation. The silicides can be made via fusion or solid state reaction between the elements, diffusion at a junction of the two elements, and other methods including ion beam mixing.

=== Properties ===
Nickel silicides are generally chemically and thermally stable. They have low electrical resistivity; with NiSi 10.5–18 μΩ·cm, Ni_{2}Si 24–30 μΩ·cm, NiSi_{2} 34–50 μΩ·cm; nickel-rich silicides have higher resistivity rising to 90–150 μΩ·cm in Ni_{31}Si_{12}.

== Uses ==
=== Microelectronics ===
Nickel silicides are important in microelectronic devices – specific silicides are good conductors, with NiSi having a conductivity approaching that of elemental nickel. With silicon carbide as the semiconductor nickel reacts at elevated temperatures to form nickel silicides and carbon.

=== Other ===
Nickel silicides have potential as coatings for nickel-based superalloys and stainless steel, due to their corrosion, oxidation, and wear resistance. NiSi has been investigated as a hydrogenation catalyst for unsaturated hydrocarbons. Nickel silicide nanoparticles supported on silica support have been suggested as an alternative catalyst to widely used pyrophoric Raney nickel.

== See also ==
- J. Marvin Herndon, who promoted a theory that the Earth's core is nickel silicide
- Titanium disilicide, also used in microelectronics
- Salicide, self-aligned silicides
