= Cobalt disilicide =

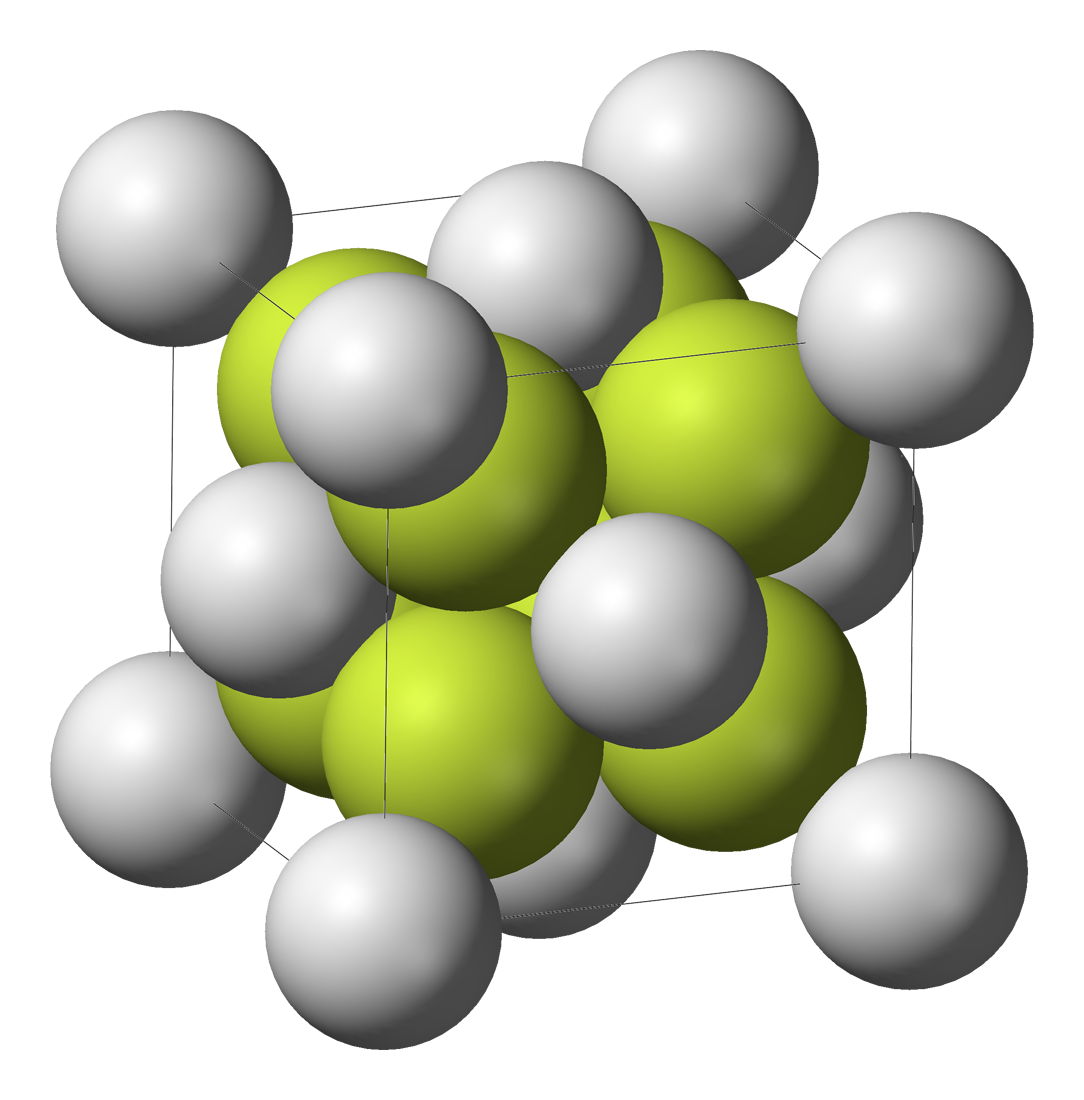

Names
- IUPAC name Cobalt disilicide

Identifiers
CAS Number	12017-12-8
3D model (JSmol)	Interactive image
ChemSpider	57449125
ECHA InfoCard	100.031.457
PubChem CID	135120840
CompTox Dashboard (EPA)	DTXSID201010278
- InChI: InChI=1S/Co.2Si
- SMILES: [Si]=[Co]=[Si]

Properties
Chemical formula	CoSi_{2}
Molar mass	115.104 g/mol
Appearance	gray cubic crystals
Density	4.9 g/cm^{3}
Melting point	1,326 °C (2,419 °F; 1,599 K)
Magnetic susceptibility (χ)	0.4×10^{−6} emu/g
Refractive index (n_{D})	2.07 (589 nm)

Structure
Crystal structure	Fluorite
Space group	Fm3̅m (No. 225), cF12
Lattice constant	a = 0.5353 nm
Formula units (Z)	4

Hazards
Flash point	Non-flammable

Related compounds
Other cations	Iron disilicide Manganese disilicide Titanium disilicide
- Except where otherwise noted, data are given for materials in their standard state (at 25 °C [77 °F], 100 kPa). (what is ?) Infobox references

Cobalt disilicide (CoSi_{2}) is an intermetallic compound, a silicide of cobalt. It is a superconductor with a transition temperature of around 1.4 K and a critical field of 105 Oe.

== Cited sources ==
- Haynes, William M., ed. (2016). CRC Handbook of Chemistry and Physics (97th ed.). CRC Press. ISBN 9781498754293.
