= Manganese disilicide =

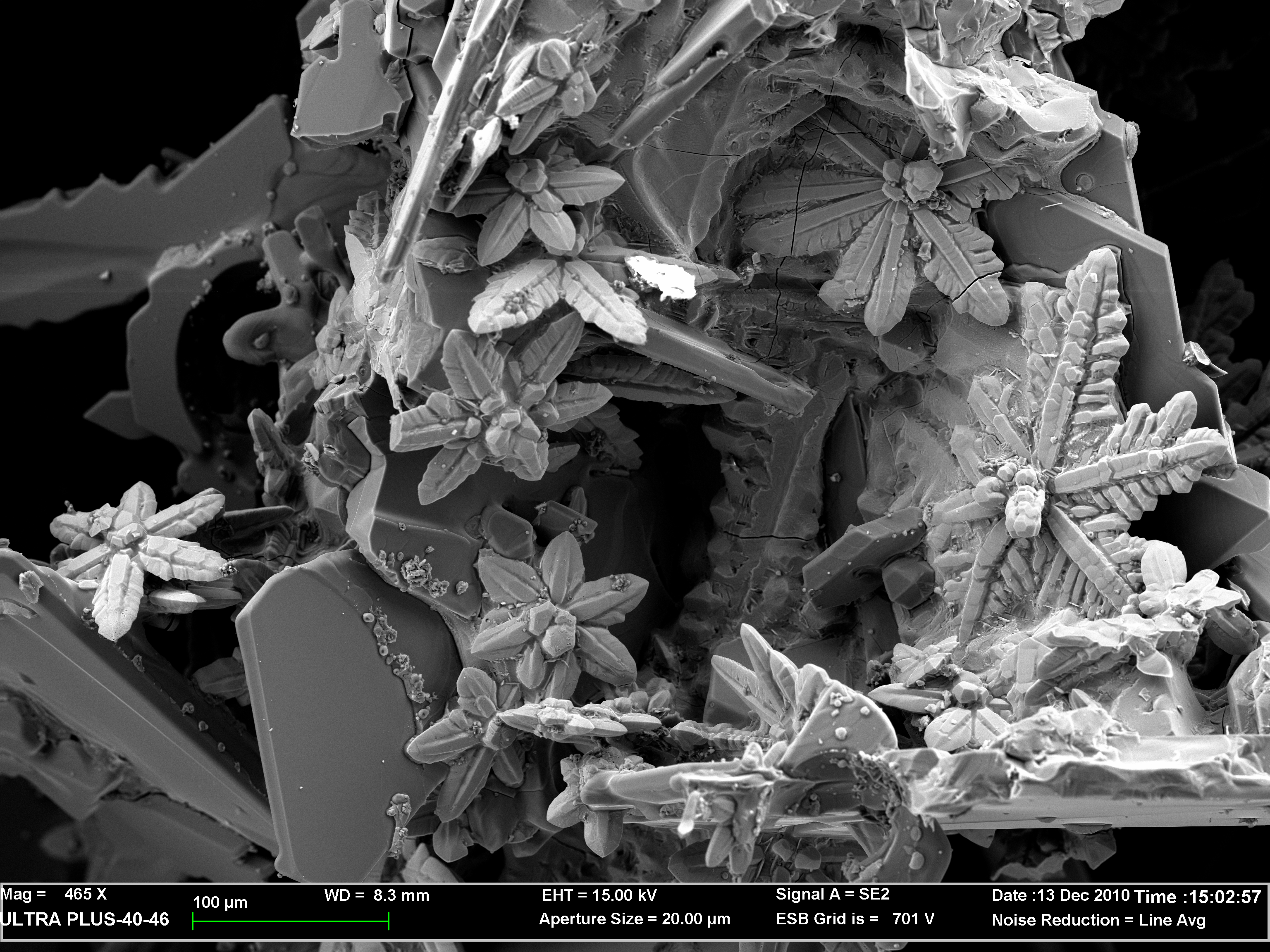
- Electron micrograph of MnSi_{2} stars grown on Si plates

Names
- IUPAC name Manganese disilicide

Identifiers
CAS Number	12032-86-9
3D model (JSmol)	Interactive image
ChemSpider	4891874
ECHA InfoCard	100.031.606
EC Number	234-781-6
PubChem CID	6336881
- InChI: InChI=1S/Mn.2Si Key: FHTCLMVMBMJAEE-UHFFFAOYSA-N
- SMILES: [Si]=[Mn]=[Si]

Properties
Chemical formula	MnSi_{2}
Molar mass	111.109 g/mol
Appearance	gray crystals
Melting point	1,152 °C (2,106 °F; 1,425 K) dec.
Magnetic susceptibility (χ)	0.7×10^{−6} emu/g (MnSi_{1.72})

Structure
Crystal structure	Tetragonal
Space group	P4̅c2 (No. 116), tP44
Lattice constant	a = 0.5518 nm, c = 1.7449 nm
Formula units (Z)	4

Hazards
Flash point	Non-flammable

Related compounds
Other cations	Cobalt disilicide Iron disilicide Titanium disilicide
Related compounds	Manganese monosilicide
- Except where otherwise noted, data are given for materials in their standard state (at 25 °C [77 °F], 100 kPa). (what is ?) Infobox references

Manganese disilicide (MnSi_{2}) is an intermetallic compound, a silicide of manganese. It is a non-stoichiometric compound, with a silicon deficiency expressed as MnSi_{2–x}. Crystal structures of many MnSi_{2–x} compounds resemble a chimney ladder and are called Nowotny phases. They include MnSi_{2} (x=0), Mn_{4}Si_{7} (x=0.250), Mn_{11}Si_{19} (x=0.273), Mn_{15}Si_{26} (x=0.267) and Mn_{27}Si_{47} (x=0.259). These phases have very similar unit cells whose length varies from 1.75 nm for MnSi_{2} or Mn_{4}Si_{7}, which have almost the same structures, to 11.8 nm for Mn_{27}Si_{47}.

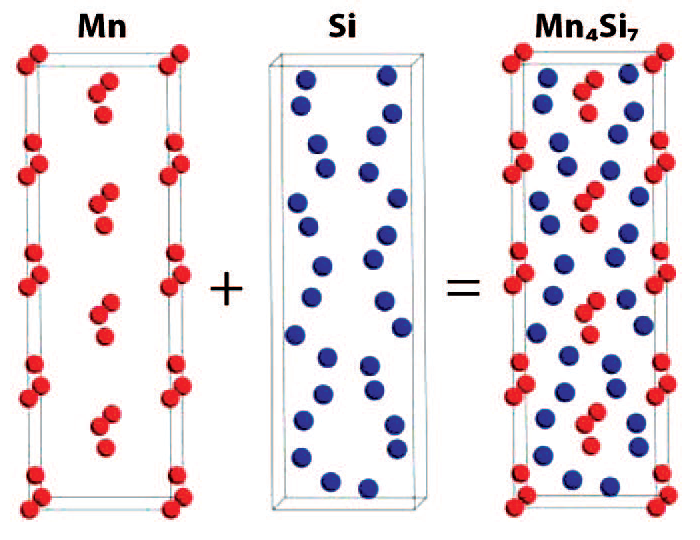
Mn_{4}Si_{7} structure

MnSi_{2–x} Nowotny phases have a Mn sublattice with a β-tin structure overlaid with a face-centered cubic Si sublattice. They resemble chimneys of transition metal atoms containing spiraling ladders of Si. These phases are semiconductors with a band gap of 0.4 to 0.9 eV. They exhibit a reasonably high thermoelectric figure of merit ZT ~ 0.8 and have potential applications in thermoelectric generators.
