= Chromium(II) silicide =

Names
- IUPAC name Chromium(2+) silicide

Identifiers
| CAS Number | 12018-09-6 |
| 3D model (JSmol) | Interactive image |
| ChemSpider | 17340236 |
| ECHA InfoCard | 100.031.472 |
| EC Number | 234-633-0234-633-0 |
| PubChem CID | 45051936 |
| CompTox Dashboard (EPA) | DTXSID901010279 |
- InChI: InChI=1S/Cr.2Si Key: CHXGWONBPAADHP-UHFFFAOYSA-N
- SMILES: [Si-]#[Si-].[Cr+2]

Properties
| Chemical formula | CrSi_{2} |
| Molar mass | 108.167 g/mol |
| Appearance | white powder |
| Odor | odorless |
| Density | 4.91 g/cm^{3} |
| Melting point | 1,490 °C (2,710 °F; 1,760 K) |
| Solubility in water | insoluble |
| Band gap | 0.35 eV (indirect) |
| Magnetic susceptibility (χ) | −0.5×10^{−6} emu/g |

Structure
| Crystal structure | Hexagonal, hP9 |
| Space group | P6_{2}22, No. 180 |
| Lattice constant | a = 0.44268 nm, c = 0.63751 nm |
| Formula units (Z) | 3 |

Hazards
- NIOSH (US health exposure limits)
| PEL (Permissible) | TWA 1 mg/m^{3} |
| REL (Recommended) | TWA 0.5 mg/m^{3} |
| IDLH (Immediate danger) | 250 mg/m^{3} |

Related compounds
| Other cations | Molybdenum disilicide Tungsten disilicide |
| Related compounds | Chromium(IV) silicide |
- Except where otherwise noted, data are given for materials in their standard state (at 25 °C [77 °F], 100 kPa). Infobox references

Chromium(II) silicide or chromium disilicide is an inorganic compound of chromium and silicon. Its chemical formula is CrSi_{2}. It is a p-type thermoelectric semiconductor with an indirect bandgap of 0.35 eV.
