= Iron disilicide =

Names
- IUPAC name Iron disilicide
- Other names Iron(VIII) silicide

Identifiers
CAS Number	12022-99-0
3D model (JSmol)	Interactive image
ChemSpider	4891873
ECHA InfoCard	100.031.507
EC Number	234-671-8
PubChem CID	6336880
CompTox Dashboard (EPA)	DTXSID00892427
- InChI: InChI=1S/Fe.2Si Key: JRACIMOSEUMYIP-UHFFFAOYSA-N
- SMILES: [Si]=[Fe]=[Si]

Properties
Chemical formula	FeSi_{2}
Molar mass	112.016 g/mol
Appearance	gray tetragonal crystals
Density	4.74 g/cm^{3}
Melting point	1,220 °C (2,230 °F; 1,490 K)
Band gap	0.87 eV (ind.)
Electron mobility	1200 cm^{2}/(V·s)

Structure
Crystal structure	Orthorhombic
Space group	Cmca (No. 64), oS48
Lattice constant	a = 0.9863 nm, b = 0.7791 nm, c = 0.7833 nm
Formula units (Z)	16

Hazards
- GHS labelling
Pictograms	(GHS07: Exclamation mark)
Signal word	Warning
Hazard statements	H315, H319, H335
Flash point	Non-flammable

Related compounds
Other cations	Cobalt disilicide Manganese disilicide Titanium disilicide
- Except where otherwise noted, data are given for materials in their standard state (at 25 °C [77 °F], 100 kPa). (what is ?) Infobox references

Iron disilicide (FeSi_{2}) is an intermetallic compound, a silicide of iron that occurs in nature as the rare mineral linzhiite. At room temperature it forms orthorhombic crystals (β phase), which convert into a tetragonal α phase upon heating to 970 °C.

== See also ==
- Iron monosilicide
- Ferrosilicon
- Silicon steel
