= Sodium silicide =

Sodium silicide (NaSi, Na_{4}Si_{4}) is a binary inorganic compound consisting of sodium and silicon. It is a solid black or grey crystalline material. It can be synthesized by melting sodium or a sodium-potassium alloy with finely powdered silica gel. Temperature control of the reaction determine the final product's reactivity; heating above 400 °C creates an air-stable and less reducing product, while the product produced at room temperature is a pyrophoric and highly moisture-sensitive powder.

Sodium silicide's empirical formula (NaSi) is deceptive, as it is a Zintl phase: instead of containing discrete Si^{−} anions, it contains Si^{4−}_{4} tetrahedra, which leads to the more descriptive formula Na_{4}Si_{4}. These silicon tetrahedra condense into various crosslinked silicon polymers at high pressure.

Sodium silicide reacts readily with water yielding gaseous hydrogen and aqueous sodium silicate in an exothermic reaction (~175 kJ·mol^{−1}):

2 NaSi + 5 H_{2}O → 5 H_{2} + Na_{2}Si_{2}O_{5}

This is used in hydrogen technologies to generate hydrogen as a fuel. It is also used as high energy dense storage for hydrogen under low pressure.

== See also ==
- Silicide
- Binary compounds of silicon
