= Lithium hexafluorotitanate =

Names
- Other names dilithium hexafluorotitanate, titanium lithium hexafluoride

Identifiers
CAS Number	19193-50-1
3D model (JSmol)	Interactive image
ChemSpider	11511486
EC Number	242-866-4
PubChem CID	22639608
UNII	XH7B9XU6KM
- InChI: InChI=1S/6FH-C.2Li.Ti/h6*1H;;;/q;;;;;;2*+1;+4/p-6 Key: AHARGQJTTQNBPT-UHFFFAOYSA-H
- SMILES: [Li+].[Li+].F[Ti-2](F)(F)(F)(F)F

Properties
Chemical formula	F_{6}Li_{2}Ti
Molar mass	175.74 g·mol^{−1}
Appearance	solid
Density	2.89 g/cm^{3}
- Except where otherwise noted, data are given for materials in their standard state (at 25 °C [77 °F], 100 kPa). Infobox references

Lithium hexafluorotitanate is an inorganic compound of lithium, fluorine, and titanium with the chemical formula Li_{2}TiF_{6}.

== Synthesis ==
Interaction of titanium hydroxide or oxide and lithium fluoride with hydrofluoric acid.

== Physical properties ==
The compound forms crystals of tetragonal crystal system with a space group of P42/mnm (no. 136).

== Chemical properties ==
The compound forms hydrates Li_{3}TiF_{6}*xH_{2}O.
