= Hapkeite =

Silicide mineral

General
- Category: Native element minerals
- Formula: Fe_{2}Si
- IMA symbol: Hpk
- Strunz classification: 1.BB.35
- Crystal system: Isometric
- Crystal class: Hexoctahedral (m3̅m); H-M symbol: (4/m 3̅ 2/m)
- Space group: Pm3̅m
- Unit cell: a = 2.831 Å; Z = 1

Identification
- Color: silvery, with a slight tarnish
- Luster: metallic
- Diaphaneity: opaque

Hapkeite is a mineral discovered in the Dhofar 280 meteorite found in 2000 in Oman on the Arabian Peninsula. The meteorite is believed to originate from the Moon; specifically, it appears to be a fragment of lunar highland breccia. Hapkeite's composition is of silicon and iron, and it is similar to other silicon-iron minerals found on Earth. An impact on the Moon is thought to have launched the partially molten or vaporized material into orbit.

Due to its 1:2 composition of silicon-iron, hapkeite was given the chemical formula Fe_{2}Si. It occurs as opaque, yellowish to silvery microscopic isometric crystals.

It is named after Bruce Hapke, who predicted the presence and importance of vapor-deposited coatings on lunar soil grains (space weathering).

Beside hapkeite, other natural iron silicide minerals include gupeiite, naqite, linzhiite, luobusaite, suessite, xifengite, and zangboite.

== See also ==
- Glossary of meteoritics
- List of minerals
- List of minerals named after people
