= Potassium hexafluorotitanate =

Names
- Other names Potassium hexafluorotitanate(IV), dipotassium hexafluorotitanate, titanium potassium hexafluoride

Identifiers
CAS Number	16919-27-0
3D model (JSmol)	Interactive image
ChemSpider	9239654
ECHA InfoCard	100.037.230
EC Number	240-969-9
PubChem CID	11064502
CompTox Dashboard (EPA)	DTXSID7029740
- InChI: InChI=1S/6FH.2K.Ti/h6*1H;;;/q;;;;;;2*+1;+4/p-6 Key: RXCBCUJUGULOGC-UHFFFAOYSA-H
- SMILES: [F-].[F-].F[Ti](F)(F)F.[K+].[K+]

Properties
Chemical formula	F_{6}K_{2}Ti
Molar mass	240.054 g·mol^{−1}
Appearance	White powder
Melting point	780 °C (1,440 °F; 1,050 K)
Boiling point	235–237 °C (455–459 °F; 508–510 K)
Solubility in water	soluble in hot water

Hazards
- GHS labelling
Pictograms	(GHS05: Corrosive) (GHS06: Toxic) (GHS07: Exclamation mark)
Signal word	Danger
Hazard statements	H302, H317, H318
Precautionary statements	P261, P280, P301, P302, P312, P338, P351, P352
- Except where otherwise noted, data are given for materials in their standard state (at 25 °C [77 °F], 100 kPa). Infobox references

Potassium hexafluorotitanate is an inorganic compound of potassium, fluorine, and titanium with the chemical formula K_{2}TiF_{6}.

== Synthesis ==
Hydrofluoric acid reacts with metatitanic acid to generate fluorotitanic acid; then it is neutralized with potassium hydroxide to produce potassium hexafluorotitanate.

== Physical properties ==
The compound forms white powder. Potassium hexafluorotitanate is soluble in hot water, slightly soluble in cold water, and inorganic acid. Insoluble in ammonia.

== Chemical properties ==
Reacts with sodium to form titanium, potassium monofluoride and sodium monofluoride:

K_{2}TiF_{6} + 4Na → Ti + 2KF + 4NaF

== Uses ==
The compound is used as an analytical reagent, also used in the manufacture of titanic acid and metallic titanium. Can also be used as a catalyst for polypropylene synthesis. It is a component of the metal phosphating surface adjustment.
