= Suessite =

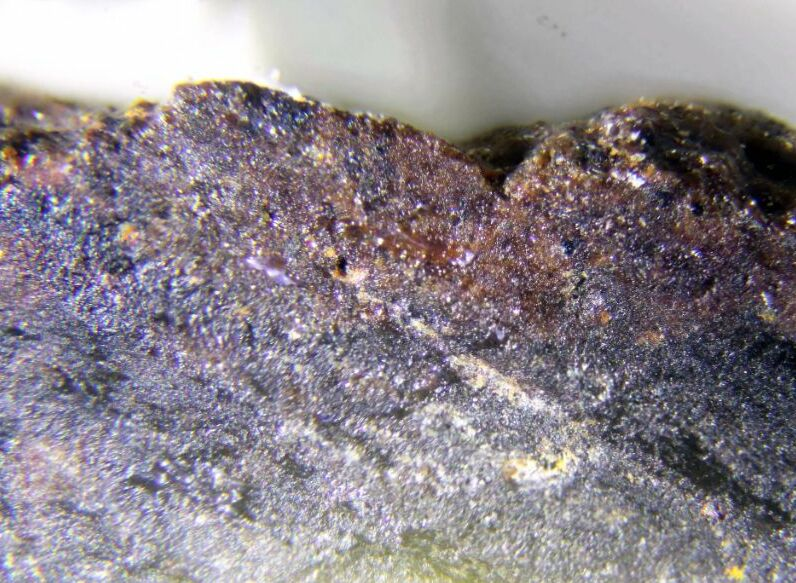

General
- Category: Iron silicide
- Formula: Fe_{3}Si
- IMA symbol: Sss
- Strunz classification: 1.BB.05
- Crystal system: Cubic
- Crystal class: Hexoctahedral (m3̅m); H-M symbol: (4/m 3̅ 2/m)
- Space group: Im3m
- Unit cell: a = 2.841 Å; Z = 0.5

Identification
- Color: Cream white in reflected light, Terrestrial is light gray with a yellow tint
- Crystal habit: forms oval accumulations, polycrystalline aggregates
- Cleavage: None
- Specific gravity: 6.34
- Optical properties: X-ray Wavelength = 1.541838
- Other characteristics: Ferromagnetic, degree of disorder = 11%, Curie point = 550°C, magnetic moment = 4.6 μ_{B}, microhardness = 531–532 kg/mm^{2}

Suessite is a rare iron silicide mineral with chemical formula: Fe_{3}Si. The mineral was named after Professor Hans E. Suess. It was discovered in 1982 during the chemical analysis of The North Haig olivine pigeonite achondrite (ureilite). It is a cream white color in reflected light, and ranges in size from 1 μm "blebs" to elongated grains that can reach up to 0.45 cm in length. This mineral belongs in the isometric crystal class. The isometric class has crystallographic axes that are all the same length and each of the three axes perpendicular to the other two. It is isotropic, has a structural type of DO3 and a crystal lattice of BiF_{3}.

== Optical properties ==
Suessite is an isotropic mineral, Isotropism is defined as an optical property of a mineral that stays the same from whatever direction it is observed. In thin-section microscopy, an isotropic mineral has only one refractive index. This means that light that passes through the mineral is not split into two different directions, but it passes through unchanged. Suessite, as determined from the previous definition, only has one index of refraction. When Keil, Fuchs, and Berkley first discovered the mineral they described it as having a relatively low optical relief, but there was no determination of the index of refraction. In plane polarized light, suessite is a reddish-brown color that shows no pleochroism.

== Importance ==
"Suessite can form under highly reducing conditions" say the scientists who discovered this mineral. Only one out of eight ureilites studied (the North Haig ureilite) by this group contained suessite. Most contained trace amounts of kamacite which is the mineral from which Suessite is formed. In this particular study, the meteorite that contained suessite contained the highest amounts of shock metamorphism, which can be determined from the size of a shatter cone created from the impact. This could mean that suessite is formed due to the extreme increase in temperature combined with reduction of silicate rims, shortly followed by a rapid decrease in temperature. This means that, in meteorites, the abundance of suessite can be used to identify deformation associated with shock metamorphism, which could be used to determine various characteristics of the studied meteorites.

== Other iron silicide minerals ==
The other natural iron silicides include gupeiite (Fe_{3}Si), hapkeite (Fe_{2}Si), linzhiite (FeSi_{2}), luobusaite (Fe_{0.84}Si_{2}), naquite (FeSi), xifengite (Fe_{5}Si_{3}), and zangboite (TiFeSi_{2}).
