= Mavlyanovite =

Manganese-silicon mineral

General
- Category: Minerals
- Formula: Mn_{5}Si_{3}
- IMA symbol: Mav
- Strunz classification: 01.BB.05
- Dana classification: 01.01.23.06
- Crystal system: Hexagonal
- Space group: P6_{3}/mcm
- Unit cell: a = 6.8971, c = 4.8075, Z = 2; V = 198.05

Structure

Identification
- Colour: grey
- Fracture: conchoidal
- Mohs scale hardness: 7
- Luster: metallic
- Streak: dark grey
- Diaphaneity: opaque
- Density: 6.02

Mavlyanovite is a rare manganese-silicon mineral with formula Mn_{5}Si_{3}. It was named after Gani Mavlyanov, an Uzbek geologist who lived from 1910 to 1988.

The mineral was first found in lamproite, as a phase that had crystallised from volcanic glass. Associated minerals included manganese siliciphosphide and manganese silicicarbide.

Transition metal silicides represent a rich variety of intermetallic compounds with specific crystal and electronic structures owing to the strong interaction between metals and silicon. Recently, transition metal silicides have gained considerable attention from the scientific community because of their unique physicochemical properties such as high thermal stability, excellent electronic conductivity, low electrical resistivity, high strength, good thermodynamic stability, good oxidation, and corrosion resistance. With these favorable properties, transition metal silicides are potential candidates for various nanotechnological applications such as electronics, spintronics, thermoelectrics, and solar energy harvesting. Among all transition metal silicides, manganese silicides have been investigated extensively because of their complex structural diversity and fascinating physical properties. Manganese silicides possess seven thermodynamically stable phases, namely: MnSi_{1.7} (tetragonal), MnSi (cubic), Mn_{5}Si_{3} (hexagonal), Mn_{5}Si_{2} (tetragonal), Mn_{3}Si (cubic), Mn_{4}Si (rhombohedral), and Mn_{6}Si (rhombohedral). Each of these phases results in different magnetic and thermoelectric properties either in microscopic or microscopic scales. For instance, MnSi is an excellent magnetic contact material for magnetic applications and spintronics such as spin field-effect transistors owing to its simple cubic crystal structure without space inversion symmetry. Among the manganese silicide materials, MnSi_{1.7}, which is a higher manganese silicide, has attracted most interest in the researches for its excellent thermoelectric properties such as low thermal conductivity (2–4 W/m.K), high Seebeck coefficient (>200 mV/K at ~700 K) and estimable figure of merit (up to 0.7–0.8). Mn_{5}Si_{3} is one of the promising materials for spintronic applications because of its hexagonal structure, and has the potential to create high magnetocrystalline anisotropy with novel spin-electronic properties. In addition, Mn_{5}Si_{3} has a high melting point of 2800 K, indicating that it is a favorable candidate for high-temperature structural applications.
