= Magnesium silicide =

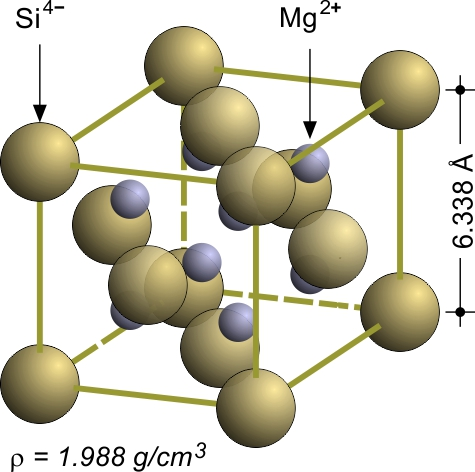

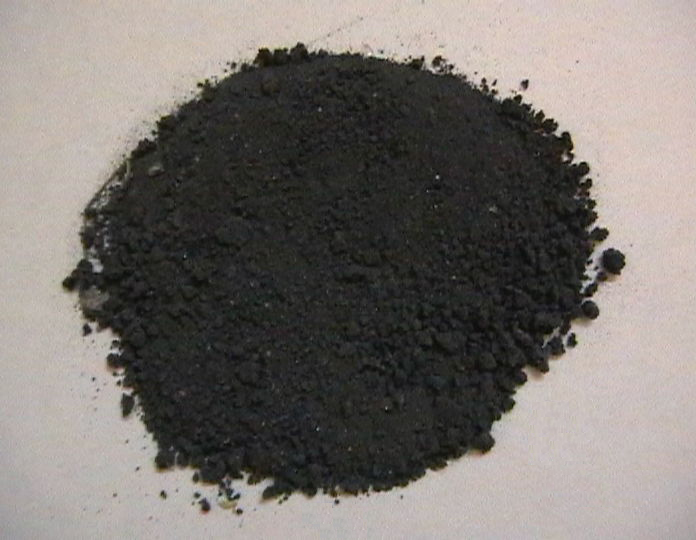

Names
- Preferred IUPAC name Magnesium silicide

Identifiers
CAS Number	22831-39-6
3D model (JSmol)	Interactive image
ChemSpider	81111
ECHA InfoCard	100.041.125
EC Number	245-254-5
PubChem CID	89858
UNII	475E6FMG3K
UN number	2624
CompTox Dashboard (EPA)	DTXSID4066830
- InChI: InChI=1S/2Mg.Si Key: YTHCQFKNFVSQBC-UHFFFAOYSA-N; InChI=1/2Mg.Si/rMg2Si/c1-3-2 Key: YTHCQFKNFVSQBC-GEBTXNJDAA
- SMILES: [Mg]=[Si]=[Mg]

Properties
Chemical formula	Mg_{2}Si
Molar mass	76.695 g·mol^{−1}
Appearance	Gray cubic crystals
Density	1.99 g cm^{−3}
Melting point	1,102 °C (2,016 °F; 1,375 K)
Solubility in water	reacts

Structure
Crystal structure	Antifluorite (cubic), cF12
Space group	Fm3̅m, #225
Lattice constant	a = 0.6351 nm
Formula units (Z)	4

Hazards
- Occupational safety and health (OHS/OSH)
Main hazards	reacts with water to produce pyrophoric silane
- GHS labelling
Pictograms	(GHS02: Flammable)
Signal word	Warning
Hazard statements	H261
Precautionary statements	P231+P232, P280, P370+P378, P402+P404, P501

Related compounds
Other cations	Calcium silicide
- Except where otherwise noted, data are given for materials in their standard state (at 25 °C [77 °F], 100 kPa). verify (what is ?) Infobox references

Magnesium silicide, Mg_{2}Si, is an inorganic compound of magnesium and silicon. As-grown Mg_{2}Si usually forms black crystals; they are semiconductors with n-type conductivity and have potential applications in thermoelectric generators.

== Crystal structure ==
Mg_{2}Si crystallizes in the antifluorite structure. In the face-centered cubic lattice, Si centers occupy the corners and face-centered positions of the unit cell, and Mg centers occupy eight tetrahedral sites in the interior of the unit cell. The coordination numbers of Si and Mg are eight and four, respectively.

== Synthesis ==
The reaction of powdered sand with magnesium powder.

It can be produced by heating silicon dioxide, SiO_{2}, found in sand, with excess magnesium. The process first forms elemental silicon and magnesium oxide:

2 Mg + SiO_{2} → 2 MgO + Si

If an excess of Mg is present, Mg_{2}Si is formed from the reaction of the remaining magnesium with the elemental silicon:

2 Mg + Si → Mg_{2}Si
If there is an excess of SiO_{2}, then elemental silicon remains.

These reactions proceed exothermically, even explosively.

== Reactions ==
The reaction of magnesium silicide with 10% hydrochloric acid.

Magnesium silicide can be viewed as consisting of Si^{4−} ions. As such, it is reactive toward acids. Thus, when magnesium silicide is treated with hydrochloric acid, silane (SiH_{4}) and magnesium chloride are produced:

Mg_{2}Si + 4 HCl → SiH_{4} + 2 MgCl_{2}

Sulfuric acid can be used as well. These protonolysis reactions are typical of a group 2 (alkaline earth metal) and group 1 (alkali metal) silicides. The early development of silicon hydrides relied on this reaction.

== Uses ==
Magnesium silicide is used to create aluminium alloys of the 6000 series, containing up to approximately 1.5% Mg_{2}Si. An alloy of this group can be age-hardened to form Guinier-Preston zones and a very fine precipitate, resulting in increased alloy strength.

Magnesium silicide is a narrow-gap semiconductor. Its as-grown crystal exhibits n-type conductivity, but it can be changed to p-type by doping with Ag, Ga, Sn and possibly Li (at high doping levels). The major potential electronic application of Mg_{2}Si is in thermoelectric generators.
