= Copper silicide =

Identifiers
CAS Number	12159-07-8
3D model (JSmol)	Interactive image
ChemSpider	29356049
ECHA InfoCard	100.032.066
EC Number	235-286-8
PubChem CID	6336988
CompTox Dashboard (EPA)	DTXSID101014289
- InChI: InChI=1S/5Cu.Si Key: JUZTWRXHHZRLED-UHFFFAOYSA-N
- SMILES: [Si].[Cu].[Cu].[Cu].[Cu].[Cu]

Properties
Chemical formula	Cu_{5}Si
Molar mass	345.8155 g/mol
Appearance	silver powder
Melting point	825 °C (1,517 °F; 1,098 K)

Hazards
- NIOSH (US health exposure limits)
PEL (Permissible)	TWA 1 mg/m^{3} (as Cu)
REL (Recommended)	TWA 1 mg/m^{3} (as Cu)
IDLH (Immediate danger)	TWA 100 mg/m^{3} (as Cu)
- Except where otherwise noted, data are given for materials in their standard state (at 25 °C [77 °F], 100 kPa). verify (what is ?) Infobox references

Copper silicide can refer to either Cu_{4}Si or pentacopper silicide, Cu_{5}Si.

Pentacopper silicide is a binary compound of silicon with copper. It is an intermetallic compound, meaning that it has properties intermediate between an ionic compound and an alloy. This solid crystalline material is a silvery solid that is insoluble in water. It forms upon heating mixtures of copper and silicon.

== Applications ==
Copper silicide thin film is used for passivation of copper interconnects, where it serves to suppress diffusion and electromigration and serves as a diffusion barrier.

Copper silicides are invoked in the Direct process, the industrial route to organosilicon compounds. In this process, copper, in the form of its silicide, catalyses the addition of methyl chloride to silicon. An illustrative reaction affords the industrially useful dimethyldichlorosilane:

2 CH_{3}Cl + Si → (CH_{3})_{2}SiCl_{2}
