= Hapke parameters =

The Hapke parameters are a set of parameters for an empirical model that is commonly used to describe the directional reflectance properties of the airless regolith surfaces of bodies in the Solar System. The model has been developed by astronomer Bruce Hapke at the University of Pittsburgh.

The main parameters are:

1. $\bar{\omega}_0$ — Single scattering albedo. This is the ratio of scattering efficiency to total light extinction (which includes also absorption), for small-particle scattering of light. That is, $K_s/(K_s+K_a)$, where $K_s$ is the scattering coefficient, and $K_a$ is the absorption coefficient
2. $h$ — The width of the opposition surge.
3. $B_0$ or $S_0$ — The strength of the opposition surge.
4. $P_0$ or g — The particle phase function parameter, also called the asymmetry factor.
5. $\theta$ — The effective surface tilt, also called the macroscopic roughness angle.

The Hapke parameters can be used to derive other albedo and scattering properties, such as the geometric albedo, the phase integral, and the Bond albedo.

== Limitations of the Hapke Model ==
The Hapke model has been criticized for having a large number of empirical parameters that can make the method difficult to constrain. In particular, the model has been shown to often require unphysical parameters (e.g., the asymmetry factor) when modeling the albedo of ices, with the delta-Eddington model better at predicting spectral albedo.

== See also ==
- Albedo
- Geometric albedo
- Bidirectional reflectance distribution function
