= Dicobalt silicide =

Names
- IUPAC name Dicobalt silicide

Identifiers
CAS Number	12134-03-1
3D model (JSmol)	Interactive image
PubChem CID	101946316
- InChI: InChI=1S/2Co.Si Key: DJNHLZWTYLEQCN-UHFFFAOYSA-N
- SMILES: [Si].[Co].[Fe]

Properties
Chemical formula	Co_{2}Si
Molar mass	145.951 g/mol

Structure
Crystal structure	Orthorhombic
Space group	Pnma (No. 62), oP12
Lattice constant	a = 0.4891 nm, b = 0.3725 nm, c = 0.7087 nm
Formula units (Z)	4

Hazards
Flash point	Non-flammable

Related compounds
Other cations	Diiron silicide
- Except where otherwise noted, data are given for materials in their standard state (at 25 °C [77 °F], 100 kPa). (what is ?) Infobox references

Dicobalt silicide (Co_{2}Si) is an intermetallic compound, a silicide of cobalt.
