= Plutonium silicide =

Names
- Other names Plutonium monosilicide

Identifiers
CAS Number	12038-52-7
3D model (JSmol)	Interactive image
ChemSpider	129549351
PubChem CID	159945682
- InChI: InChI=1S/Pu.Si Key: OBLLPTWSBXXIIY-UHFFFAOYSA-N
- SMILES: [Pu].[Si]

Properties
Chemical formula	PuSi
Molar mass	272.09 g/mol
Appearance	Grey crystals
Density	10.15
Melting point	1,576 °C (2,869 °F; 1,849 K)
Solubility in water	insoluble

Hazards
- GHS labelling
Signal word	Warning

Related compounds
Related compounds	Neptunium silicide
- Except where otherwise noted, data are given for materials in their standard state (at 25 °C [77 °F], 100 kPa). Infobox references

Plutonium silicide is a binary inorganic compound of plutonium and silicon with the chemical formula PuSi. The compound forms gray crystals.

== Synthesis ==
Reaction of plutonium dioxide and silicon carbide:

$$\mathsf{ PuO_2 + SiC \ \xrightarrow{T}\ PuSi + CO_2\uparrow }$$

Reaction of plutonium trifluoride with silicon:

$$\mathsf{ 4 PuF_3 + 7 Si \ \xrightarrow{T}\ 4 PuSi + 3 SiF_4 }$$

== Physical properties ==
Plutonium silicide forms gray crystals of orthorhombic crystal system, space group Pnma, cell parameters: a = 0.7933 nm, b = 0.3847 nm, c = 0.5727 nm, Z = 4, TiSi type structure.

At a temperature of 72 K, plutonium silicide undergoes a ferromagnetic transition.
