= Naquite =

Iron silicide mineral

General
- Category: Minerals
- Formula: FeSi
- IMA symbol: Naq
- Strunz classification: 1.BB.15
- Crystal system: Cubic
- Crystal class: Isometric – tetartoidal H-M symbol (23); Space group P2_{1}3
- Unit cell: a = 4.48 Å, Z = 4

Identification
- Color: Steel grey, tin white
- Cleavage: None
- Fracture: Brittle – conchoidal
- Mohs scale hardness: 6.5
- Luster: Metallic
- Streak: grayish black
- Diaphaneity: Opaque
- Specific gravity: 6.1–6.2 (calc.)

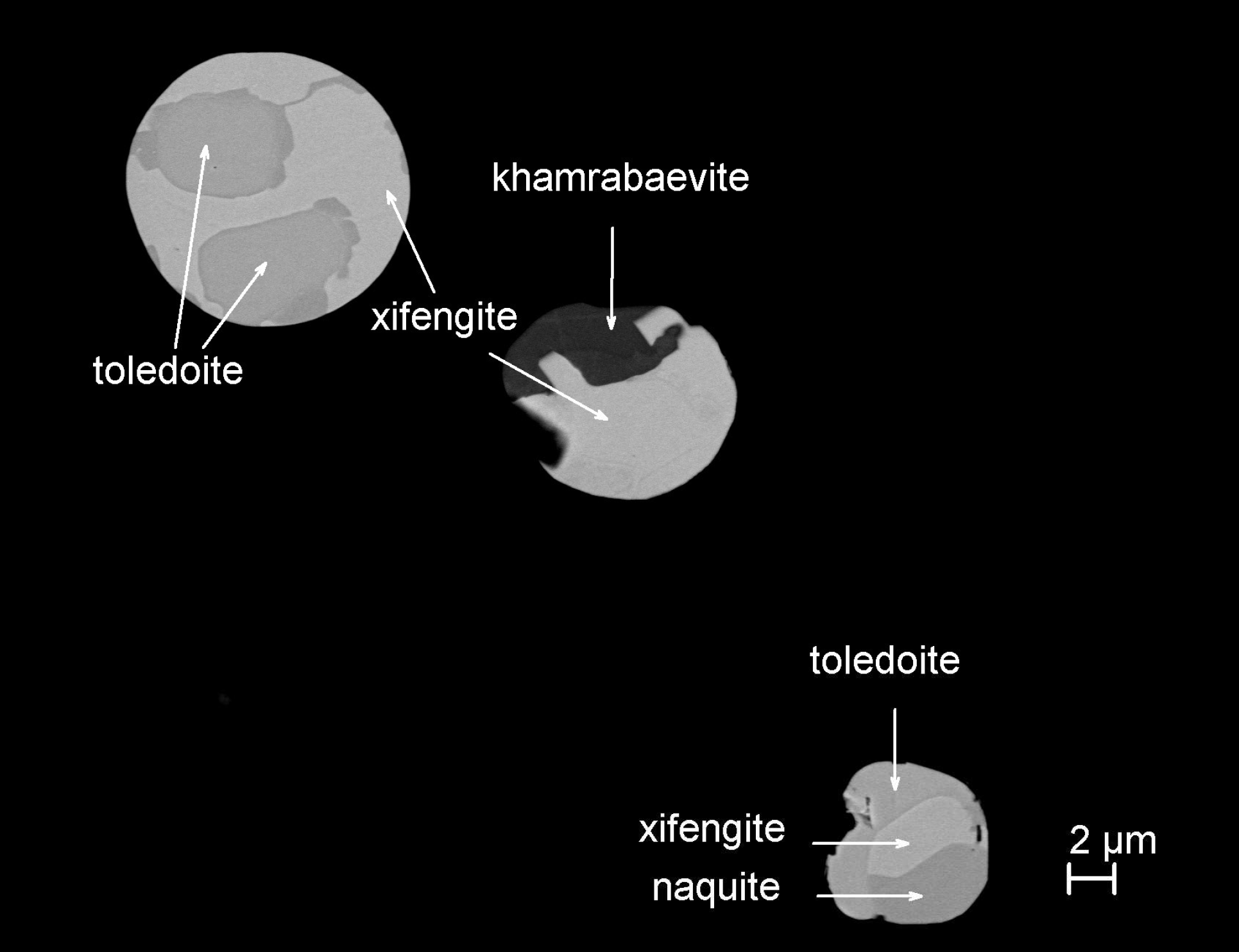
Back-scattered electron image showing naquite (bottom right) and other minerals in a corundum grain

Naquite is a mineral of iron monosilicide, FeSi. It was discovered in the 1960s in Donetsk Oblast in Soviet Union, and named fersilicite, but was not approved by the International Mineralogical Association. It was later rediscovered in the Nagqu area of Tibet and given the name naquite. Naquite occurs together with other rare iron silicide minerals, xifengite (Fe_{5}Si_{3}) and linzhiite (FeSi_{2}).
