= Silicon boride =

Silicon borides (also known as boron silicides) are lightweight ceramic compounds formed between silicon and boron. Several stoichiometric silicon boride compounds, SiB_{n}, have been reported: silicon triboride, SiB_{3}, silicon tetraboride, SiB_{4}, silicon hexaboride, SiB_{6}, as well as SiB_{n} (n = 14, 15, 40, etc.). The n = 3 and n = 6 phases were reported as being co-produced together as a mixture for the first time by Henri Moissan and Alfred Stock in 1900 by briefly heating silicon and boron in a clay vessel. The tetraboride was first reported as being synthesized directly from the elements in 1960 by three independent groups: Carl Cline and Donald Sands; Ervin Colton; and Cyrill Brosset and Bengt Magnusson. It has been proposed that the triboride is a silicon-rich version of the tetraboride. Hence, the stoichiometry of either compound could be expressed as SiB_{4 - x} where x = 0 or 1. All the silicon borides are black, crystalline materials of similar density: 2.52 and 2.47 g cm^{−3}, respectively, for the n = 3(4) and 6 compounds. On the Mohs scale of mineral hardness, SiB_{4 - x} and SiB_{6} are intermediate between diamond (10) and ruby (9). The silicon borides may be grown from boron-saturated silicon in either the solid or liquid state.

The SiB_{6} crystal structure contains interconnected icosahedra (polyhedra with 20 faces), icosihexahedra (polyhedra with 26 faces), as well as isolated silicon and boron atoms. Due to the size mismatch between the silicon and boron atoms, silicon can be substituted for boron in the B_{12} icosahedra up to a limiting stoichiometry corresponding to SiB_{2.89}. The structure of the tetraboride SiB_{4} is isomorphous to that of boron carbide (B_{4}C), B_{6}P, and B_{6}O. It is metastable with respect to the hexaboride. Nevertheless, it can be prepared due to the relative ease of crystal nucleation and growth.

Both SiB_{4 - x} and SiB_{6} become superficially oxidized when heated in air or oxygen and each is attacked by boiling sulfuric acid and by fluorine, chlorine, and bromine at high temperatures. The silicon borides are electrically conducting. The hexaboride has a low coefficient of thermal expansion and a high nuclear cross section for thermal neutrons.

Silicon tetraboride was used in the manufacture of the black coatings applied to the High-Temperature Reusable Surface Insulation tiles that composed the underside of the Space Shuttle thermal protection system.
