= Tungsten disilicide =

Names
- IUPAC name Tungsten disilicide

Identifiers
CAS Number	12039-88-2
3D model (JSmol)	Interactive image
ChemSpider	7970519
ECHA InfoCard	100.031.723
EC Number	234-909-0
PubChem CID	16212546
CompTox Dashboard (EPA)	DTXSID6093960
- InChI: InChI=1S/2Si.W Key: WQJQOUPTWCFRMM-UHFFFAOYSA-N
- SMILES: [Si]#[W]#[Si]

Properties
Chemical formula	WSi_{2}
Molar mass	240.011 g/mol
Appearance	blue-gray tetragonal crystals
Density	9.3 g/cm^{3}
Melting point	2,160 °C (3,920 °F; 2,430 K)
Solubility in water	insoluble

Hazards
NFPA 704 (fire diamond)	1 0 0
Flash point	Non-flammable

Related compounds
Other anions	Tungsten carbide Tungsten nitride
Other cations	Molybdenum disilicide
- Except where otherwise noted, data are given for materials in their standard state (at 25 °C [77 °F], 100 kPa). verify (what is ?) Infobox references

Tungsten disilicide (WSi_{2}) is an inorganic compound, a silicide of tungsten. It is an electrically conductive ceramic material.

== Chemistry ==
Tungsten disilicide can react violently with substances such as strong acids, fluorine, oxidizers, and interhalogens.

== Applications ==
It is used in microelectronics as a contact material, with resistivity 60–80 μΩ cm; it forms at 1000 °C. It is often used as a shunt over polysilicon lines to increase their conductivity and increase signal speed. Tungsten disilicide layers can be prepared by chemical vapor deposition, e.g. using monosilane or dichlorosilane with tungsten hexafluoride as source gases. The deposited film is non-stoichiometric, and requires annealing to convert to more conductive stoichiometric form. Tungsten disilicide is a replacement for earlier tungsten films. Tungsten disilicide is also used as a barrier layer between silicon and other metals, e.g. tungsten.

Tungsten disilicide is also of value towards use in microelectromechanical systems, where it is mostly applied as thin films for fabrication of microscale circuits. For such purposes, films of tungsten disilicide can be plasma-etched using e.g. nitrogen trifluoride gas.

WSi_{2} performs well in applications as oxidation-resistant coatings. In particular, in similarity to molybdenum disilicide, MoSi_{2}, the high emissivity of tungsten disilicide makes this material attractive for high temperature radiative cooling, with implications in heat shields.
