= Molybdenum disilicide =

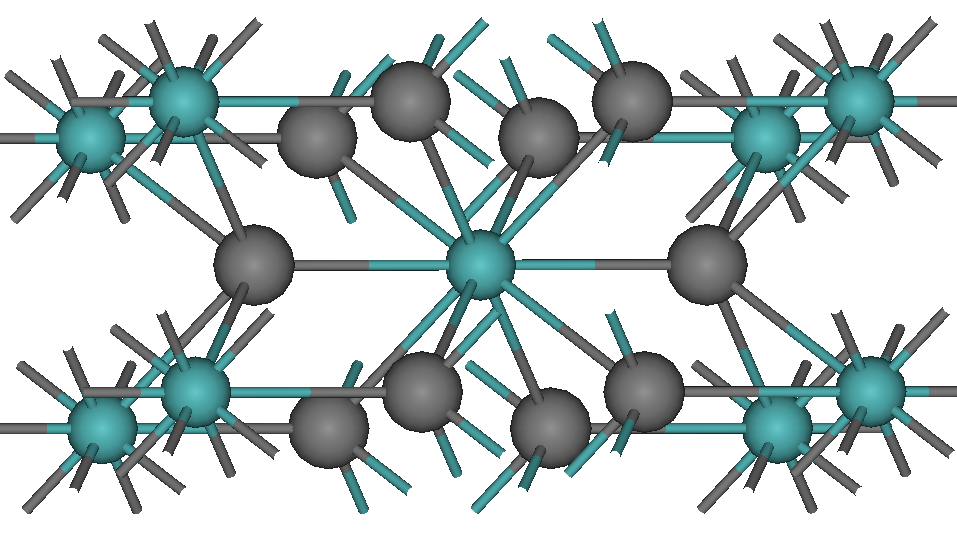

Names
- IUPAC name Molybdenum disilicide
- Other names Molybdenum(VIII) silicide

Identifiers
CAS Number	12136-78-6
3D model (JSmol)	Interactive image
ChemSpider	8329647
ECHA InfoCard	100.032.016
EC Number	235-231-8
PubChem CID	6336985
CompTox Dashboard (EPA)	DTXSID601014284
- InChI: InChI=1S/Mo.2Si Key: YXTPWUNVHCYOSP-UHFFFAOYSA-N
- SMILES: [Si]=[Mo]=[Si]

Properties
Chemical formula	MoSi_{2}
Molar mass	152.11 g/mol
Appearance	gray metallic solid
Density	6.26 g/cm^{3}
Melting point	2,030 °C (3,690 °F; 2,300 K)

Structure
Crystal structure	Tetragonal
Space group	I4/mmm (No. 139), tI6
Lattice constant	a = 0.32112 nm, c = 0.7845 nm
Formula units (Z)	2

Hazards
- GHS labelling
Pictograms	(GHS07: Exclamation mark)
Signal word	Warning
Hazard statements	H301, H312, H332
Precautionary statements	P261, P264, P270, P271, P280, P301+P317, P302+P352, P304+P340, P317, P321, P330, P362+P364, P501
Flash point	Non-flammable

Related compounds
Other cations	Chromium disilicide Tungsten disilicide
- Except where otherwise noted, data are given for materials in their standard state (at 25 °C [77 °F], 100 kPa). verify (what is ?) Infobox references

Molybdenum disilicide (MoSi_{2}, or molybdenum silicide), an intermetallic compound, a silicide of molybdenum, is a refractory ceramic with primary use in heating elements. It has moderate density, melting point 2030 °C, and is electrically conductive. At high temperatures it forms a passivation layer of silicon dioxide, protecting it from further oxidation. The thermal stability of MoSi_{2} alongside its high emissivity make this material, alongside WSi_{2} attractive for applications as a high emissivity coatings in heat shields for atmospheric entry. MoSi_{2} is a gray metallic-looking material with tetragonal crystal structure (alpha-modification); its beta-modification is hexagonal and unstable. It is insoluble in most acids but soluble in nitric acid and hydrofluoric acid.

While MoSi_{2} has excellent resistance to oxidation and high Young's modulus at temperatures above 1000 °C, it is brittle in lower temperatures. Also, at above 1200 °C it loses creep resistance. These properties limits its use as a structural material, but may be offset by using it together with another material as a composite material.

Molybdenum disilicide and MoSi_{2}-based materials are usually made by sintering. Plasma spraying can be used for producing its dense monolithic and composite forms; material produced this way may contain a proportion of β-MoSi_{2} due to its rapid cooling.

Molybdenum disilicide heating elements can be used for temperatures up to 1800 °C, in electric furnaces used in laboratory and production environment in production of glass, steel, electronics, ceramics, and in heat treatment of materials. While the elements are brittle, they can operate at high power without aging, and their electrical resistivity does not increase with operation time. Their maximum operating temperature has to be lowered in atmospheres with low oxygen content due to breakdown of the passivation layer.

Molybdenum disilicide is used in microelectronics as a contact material. It is often used as a shunt over polysilicon lines to increase their conductivity and increase signal speed.

== See also ==
- Silicon carbide
