= Geometric albedo =

Ratio of a celestial body's brightness to that of a Lambertian ideal

In astronomy, the geometric albedo of a celestial body is the ratio of its actual brightness as seen from the light source (i.e. at zero phase angle) to that of an idealized flat, fully reflecting, diffusively scattering (Lambertian) disk with the same cross-section. (This phase angle refers to the direction of the light paths and is not a phase angle in its normal meaning in optics or electronics.)

Diffuse scattering implies that radiation is reflected isotropically with no memory of the location of the incident light source. Zero phase angle corresponds to looking along the direction of illumination. For Earth-bound observers, this occurs when the body in question is at opposition and on the ecliptic.

The visual geometric albedo refers to the geometric albedo quantity when accounting for only electromagnetic radiation in the visible spectrum.

== Airless bodies ==
The surface materials (regoliths) of airless bodies (in fact, the majority of bodies in the Solar System) are strongly non-Lambertian and exhibit the opposition effect, which is a strong tendency to reflect light straight back to its source, rather than scattering light diffusely.

The geometric albedo of these bodies can be difficult to determine because of this, as their reflectance is strongly peaked for a small range of phase angles near zero. The strength of this peak differs markedly between bodies, and can only be found by making measurements at small enough phase angles. Such measurements are usually difficult due to the necessary precise placement of the observer very close to the incident light. For example, the Moon is never seen from the Earth at exactly zero phase angle, because then it is being eclipsed. Other Solar System bodies are not in general seen at exactly zero phase angle even at opposition, unless they are also simultaneously located at the ascending or descending node of their orbit, and hence lie on the ecliptic. In practice, measurements at small nonzero phase angles are used to derive the parameters which characterize the directional reflectance properties for the body (Hapke parameters). The reflectance function described by these can then be extrapolated to zero phase angle to obtain an estimate of the geometric albedo.

For very bright, solid, airless objects such as Saturn's moons Enceladus and Tethys, whose total reflectance (Bond albedo) is close to one, a strong opposition effect combines with the high Bond albedo to give them a geometric albedo above unity (1.4 in the case of Enceladus). Light is preferentially reflected straight back to its source even at low angle of incidence such as on the limb or from a slope, whereas a Lambertian surface would scatter the radiation much more broadly. A geometric albedo above unity means that the intensity of light scattered back per unit solid angle towards the source is higher than is possible for any Lambertian surface.

== Stars ==
Stars shine intrinsically, but they can also reflect light. In a close binary star system polarimetry can be used to measure the light reflected from one star off another (and vice versa) and therefore also the geometric albedos of the two stars. This task has been accomplished for the two components of the Spica system, with the geometric albedo of Spica A and B being measured as 0.0361 and 0.0136 respectively. The geometric albedos of stars are in general small, for the Sun a value of 0.001 is expected, but for hotter or lower-gravity (i.e. giant) stars the amount of reflected light is expected to be several times that of the stars in the Spica system.

== Equivalent definitions ==
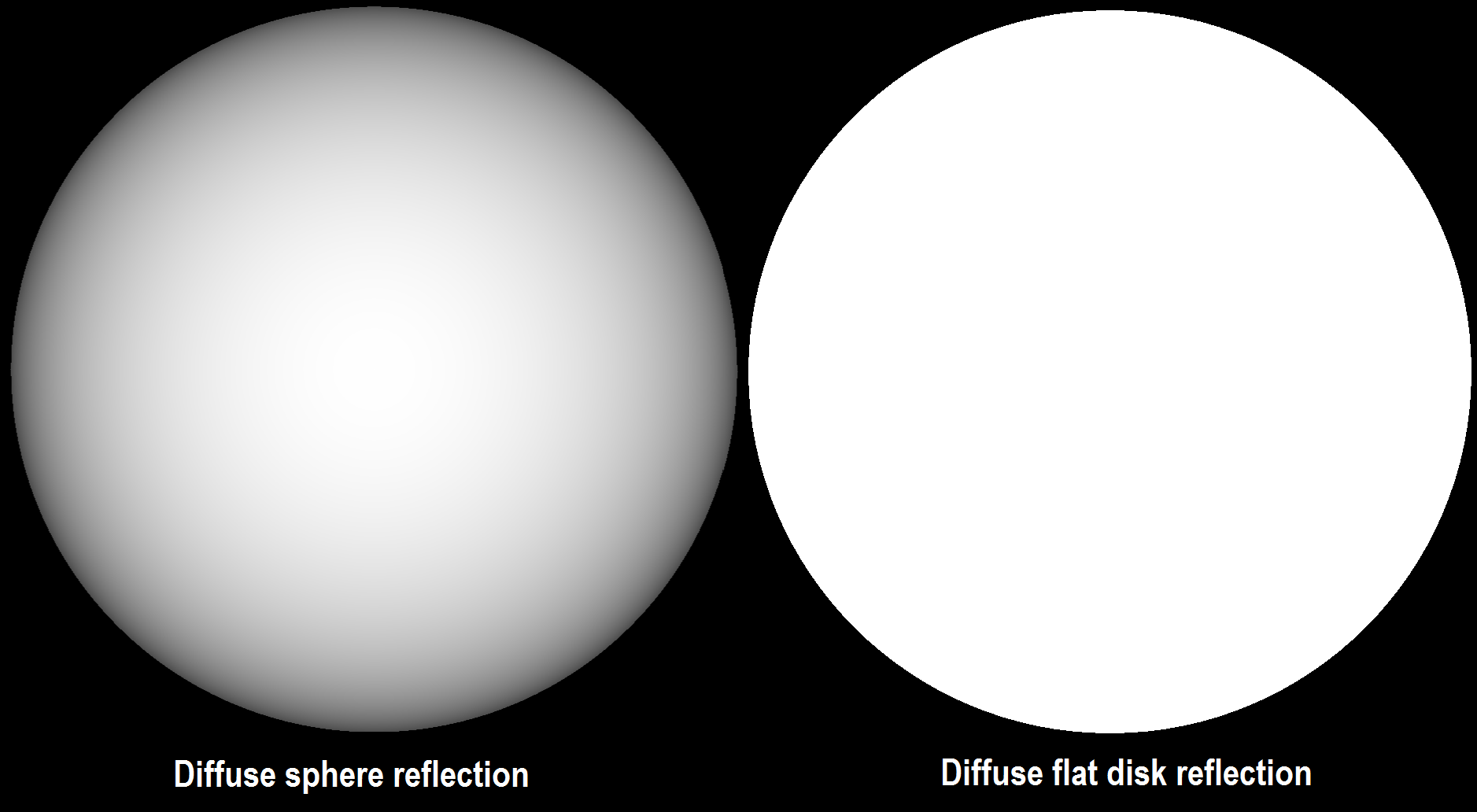
Diffuse reflection on sphere and flat disk, each for the case of a geometric albedo of 1

For the hypothetical case of a plane surface, the geometric albedo is the albedo of the surface when the illumination is provided by a beam of radiation that comes in perpendicular to the surface.

== Examples ==
The geometric albedo may be greater or smaller than the Bond albedo, depending on surface and atmospheric properties of the body in question. Some examples:

Name	Bond albedo	Visual geometric albedo
Mercury	0.088	0.142
Venus	0.76	0.689
Earth	0.294	0.24
Moon	0.11	0.12
Mars	0.25	0.17
Jupiter	0.503	0.538
Saturn	0.342	0.499
Enceladus	0.81	1.38
Uranus	0.300	0.488
Neptune	0.290	0.442
Pluto	0.4	0.44–0.61
Eris	0.99	0.96

== See also ==
- Albedo
- Anisotropy
- Bond albedo
- Lambertian reflectance
