= Xifengite =

Rare metallic iron silicide mineral

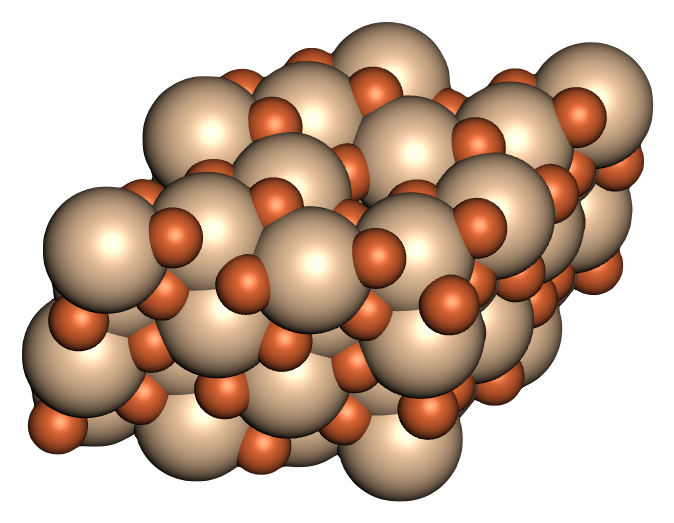

General
- Category: Native element minerals
- Formula: Fe_{5}Si_{3}
- IMA symbol: Xif
- Strunz classification: 1.BB.40
- Crystal system: Hexagonal
- Crystal class: Dihexagonal dipyramidal (6/mmm); H-M symbol: (6/m 2/m 2/m)
- Space group: P6_{3}/mcm
- Unit cell: a = 6.759(5) c = 4.720(5) [Å]; Z = 2

Identification
- Color: Gray, steel-black
- Crystal habit: As inclusions
- Mohs scale hardness: 5
- Luster: Metallic
- Streak: Black
- Diaphaneity: Opaque

Xifengite (Fe_{5}Si_{3}) is a rare metallic iron silicide mineral. The crystal system of xifengite is hexagonal. It has a specific gravity of 6.45 and a Mohs hardness of 5.5. It occurs as steel gray inclusions within other meteorite derived nickel iron mineral phases.

It was first described in 1984 and named for the eastern passageway, Xifengkou, of the Great Wall of China. The type locality is the Yanshan meteorite of the Hebei Province, China. It has also been reported from dredgings along the East Pacific Rise.

The other known natural iron silicide minerals are gupeiite (Fe_{3}Si), hapkeite (Fe_{2}Si), linzhiite (FeSi_{2}), luobusaite (Fe_{0.84}Si_{2}), naquite (FeSi), suessite ((Fe,Ni)_{3}Si), and zangboite (TiFeSi_{2}).

== See also ==
- Glossary of meteoritics
