= Polycide =

Silicide formed over polysilicon

Polycide is a silicide formed over polysilicon. Widely used in DRAMs. In a polycide MOSFET transistor process, the silicide is formed only over the polysilicon film as formation occurs prior to any polysilicon etch. Polycide processes contrast with salicide processes in which silicide is formed after the polysilicon etch. Thus, with a salicide process, silicide is formed over both the polysilicon gate and the exposed monocrystalline terminal regions of the transistor in a self-aligned fashion.
