= Diffusion barrier =

A diffusion barrier is a thin layer (usually micrometres thick) of metal usually placed between two other metals. It is done to act as a barrier to protect either one of the metals from corrupting the other.

Adhesion of a plated metal layer to its substrate requires a physical interlocking, inter-diffusion of the deposit or a chemical bonding between plate and substrate in order to work. The role of a diffusion barrier is to prevent or to retard the inter-diffusion of the two superposed metals. Therefore, to be effective, a good diffusion barrier requires inertness with respect to adjacent materials. To obtain good adhesion and a diffusion barrier simultaneously, the bonding between layers needs to come from a chemical reaction of limited range at both boundaries. Materials providing good adhesion are not necessarily good diffusion barriers and vice versa. Consequently, there are cases where two or more separate layers must be used to provide a proper interface between substrates.

== Selection ==
While the choice of diffusion barrier depends on the final function, anticipated operating temperature, and service life, are critical parameters to select diffusion barrier materials. Many thin film metal combinations have been evaluated for their adhesion and diffusion barrier properties.

Aluminum provides good electrical and thermal conductivity, adhesion and reliability because of its oxygen reactivity and the self-passivation properties of its oxide.

Copper also easily reacts with oxygen but its oxides have poor adhesion properties. As for gold its virtue relies in its inertness, and ease of application; its problem is its cost.

Chromium has excellent adhesion to many materials because of its reactivity. Its affinity for oxygen forms a thin stable oxide coat on the outer surface, creating a passivation layer which prevents further oxidation of the chromium, and of the underlying metal (if any), even in corrosive environments. Chromium plating on steel for automotive use involves three diffusion barrier layers—copper, nickel, then chromium—to provide long term durability where there will be many large temperature changes. If chromium is plated directly onto the steel, then their different thermal expansion coefficients will cause the chrome plating to peel off the steel.

Nickel, Nichrome, tantalum, hafnium, niobium, zirconium, vanadium, and tungsten are a few of the metal combinations used to form diffusion barriers for specific applications. Conductive ceramics can be also used, such as tantalum nitride, indium oxide, copper silicide, tungsten nitride, and titanium nitride.

== Integrated circuits ==
A barrier metal is a material used in integrated circuits to chemically isolate semiconductors from soft metal interconnects, while maintaining an electrical connection between them. For instance, a layer of barrier metal must surround every copper interconnect in modern integrated circuits, to prevent diffusion of copper into surrounding materials.

As the name implies, a barrier metal must have high electrical conductivity in order to maintain a good electronic contact, while maintaining a low enough copper diffusivity to sufficiently chemically isolate these copper conductor films from underlying device silicon. The thickness of the barrier films is also quite important; with too thin a barrier layer, the inner copper may contact and poison the very devices that they supply with energy and information; with barrier layers too thick, these wrapped stacks of two barrier metal films and an inner copper conductor can have a greater total resistance than the traditional aluminum interconnections would have, eliminating any benefit derived from the new metallization technology.
