= Nickel monosilicide =

NiSi
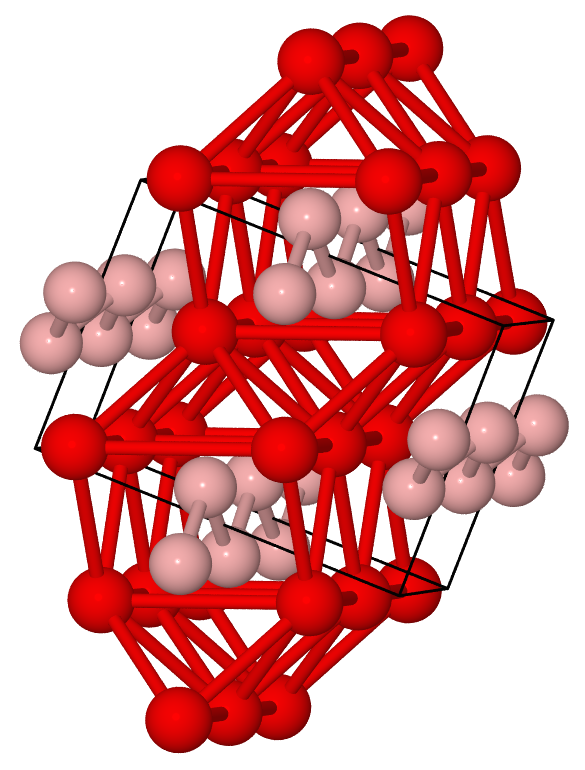

Identifiers
CAS Number	12035-57-3
3D model (JSmol)	Interactive image
ChemSpider	8351596
PubChem CID	10176091
CompTox Dashboard (EPA)	DTXSID80923344
- InChI: InChI=1S/Ni.Si Key: PEUPIGGLJVUNEU-UHFFFAOYSA-N
- SMILES: [Si].[Ni]

Properties
Chemical formula	NiSi
Molar mass	86.778 g/mol
Melting point	1,000 °C; 1,832 °F; 1,273 K
Magnetic susceptibility (χ)	−0.3×10^{−6} emu/g

Structure
Crystal structure	Orthorhombic, oP8
Space group	Pnma, No. 62
Lattice constant	a = 0.519 nm, b = 0.333 nm, c = 0.5628 nm
Formula units (Z)	4
- Except where otherwise noted, data are given for materials in their standard state (at 25 °C [77 °F], 100 kPa). Infobox references

Nickel monosilicide is an intermetallic compound formed out of nickel and silicon. Like other nickel silicides, NiSi is of importance in the area of microelectronics.

== Preparation ==
Nickel monosilicide can be prepared by depositing a nickel layer on silicon and subsequent annealing. In the case of Ni films with thicknesses above 4 nm, the normal phase transition is given by Ni_{2}Si at 250 °C followed by NiSi at 350 °C and NiSi_{2} at approximately 800 °C. For films with an initial Ni thickness below 4 nm a direct transition from orthorhombic Ni_{2}Si to epitaxial NiSi_{2−x}, skipping the nickel monosilicide phase, is observed.

== Uses ==
Several properties make NiSi an important local contact material in the area of microelectronics, among them a reduced thermal budget, low resistivity of 13–14 μΩ·cm and a reduced Si consumption when compared to alternative compounds.
