= Linzhiite =

Iron silicide mineral

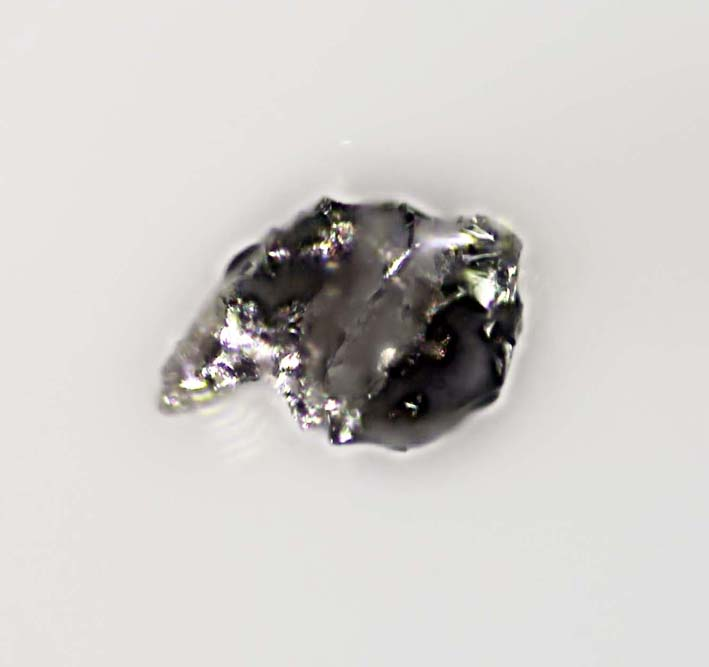
- Linzhiite nugget from Zachativsk Station, Donetsk Oblast, Ukraine

General
- Category: Minerals
- Formula: FeSi_{2}
- IMA symbol: Lzh
- Strunz classification: 1.BB.20
- Crystal system: Tetragonal – ditetragonal dipyramidal
- Crystal class: H-M symbol (4/m 2/m 2/m); Space group P4/mmm
- Unit cell: a = 2.69 Å, c = 5.08 Å, Z = 1

Identification
- Color: Steel grey
- Cleavage: None
- Fracture: Brittle – conchoidal
- Mohs scale hardness: 6.5
- Luster: Metallic
- Streak: Grayish black
- Diaphaneity: Opaque
- Specific gravity: 5.05

Linzhiite is an iron silicide mineral with the formula FeSi_{2}. It was discovered in the 1960s in Donetsk Oblast in Soviet Union, and named ferdisilicite, but was not approved by the International Mineralogical Association. It was later rediscovered near Linzhi in Tibet. Linzhiite occurs together with other rare iron silicide minerals, xifengite (Fe_{5}Si_{3}) and naquite (FeSi).
