= Neptunium silicide =

Names
- Other names Neptunium disilicide

Identifiers
| CAS Number | 60862-56-8 |
| 3D model (JSmol) | Interactive image |
- InChI: InChI=1S/Np.2Si Key: KBXNGDVSIABQJL-UHFFFAOYSA-N
- SMILES: [Np].[Si].[Si]

Properties
| Chemical formula | NpSi_{2} |
| Appearance | Crystals |
| Density | 9.03 |
| Solubility in water | insoluble |

Related compounds
| Related compounds | Plutonium silicide |
- Except where otherwise noted, data are given for materials in their standard state (at 25 °C [77 °F], 100 kPa). Infobox references

Neptunium silicide is a binary inorganic compound of neptunium and silicon with the chemical formula NpSi_{2}. The compound forms crystals and does not dissolve in water.

== Synthesis ==
Heating neptunium trifluoride with powdered silicon in vacuum:

$$\mathsf{ 4 NpF_3 + 11Si \ \xrightarrow{1500^oC}\ 4NpSi_2 + 3SiF_4 }$$

== Physical properties ==
Neptunium silicide forms crystals of tetragonal crystal system, space group I4_{1}/amd, cell parameters: a = 0.396 nm, c = 1.367 nm, Z = 4.

Neptunium disilicide does not dissolve in water.

== Chemical properties ==
Neptunium disilicide reacts with HCl:

NpSi_{2} + 8HCl → NpCl_{4} + 2SiH_{4}
