= Salicide =

Semiconductor device fabrication technique

The term salicide refers to a technology used in the microelectronics industry used to form electrical contacts between the semiconductor device and the supporting interconnect structure. The salicide process involves the reaction of a metal thin film with silicon in the active regions of the device, ultimately forming a metal silicide contact through a series of annealing and/or etch processes. The term "salicide" is a compaction of the phrase self-aligned silicide. The description "self-aligned" suggests that the contact formation does not require photolithography patterning processes, as opposed to a non-aligned technology such as polycide.

The term salicide is also used to refer to the metal silicide formed by the contact formation process, such as "titanium salicide", although this usage is inconsistent with accepted naming conventions in chemistry.

== Contact formation ==
Salicide process

The salicide process begins with deposition of a thin transition metal layer over fully formed and patterned semiconductor devices (e.g. transistors). The wafer is heated, allowing the transition metal to react with exposed silicon in the active regions of the semiconductor device (e.g., source, drain, gate) forming a low-resistance transition metal silicide. The transition metal does not react with the silicon dioxide nor the silicon nitride insulators present on the wafer. Following the reaction, any remaining transition metal is removed by chemical etching, leaving silicide contacts in only the active regions of the device. A fully integrable manufacturing process may be more complex, involving additional anneals, surface treatments, or etch processes.

=== Chemistry ===
Typical transition metals used or considered for use in salicide technology include titanium, cobalt, nickel, platinum, and tungsten. One key challenge in developing a salicide process is controlling the specific phase (compound) formed by the metal-silicon reaction. Cobalt, for example, may react with silicon to form Co_{2}Si, CoSi, CoSi_{2}, and other compounds. However, only CoSi_{2} has a sufficiently low resistance to form an effective electrical contact. For some compounds, the desired high-resistance phase is not thermodynamically stable, such as C49-TiSi_{2}, which is metastable with respect to the low-resistance C54 phase.

== Other considerations ==
Another challenge facing successful process integration include lateral growth, especially underneath the gate, which will short circuit the device.

== See also ==
- Self-aligned gate
