= Titanic acid =

o-Titanic acid
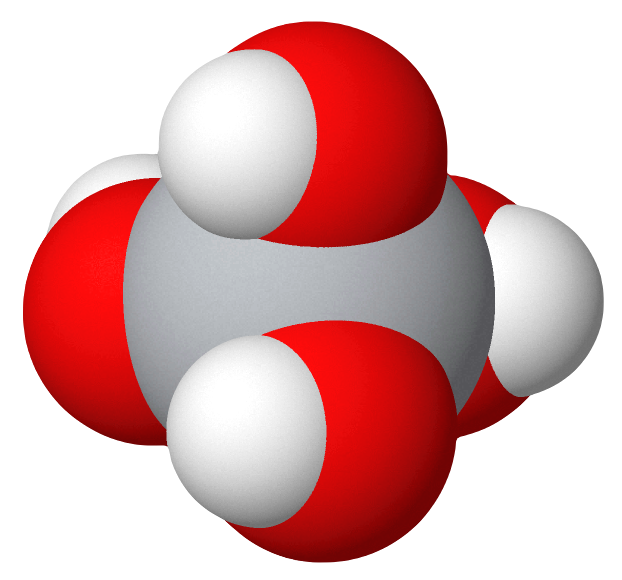

Names
- IUPAC name Titanium(IV) hydroxide
- Other names Titanium hydroxide o-Titanic acid ortho-Titanic acid

Identifiers
| CAS Number | 20338-08-3 |
| 3D model (JSmol) | Interactive image |
| ChemSpider | 15640680 |
| ECHA InfoCard | 100.039.752 |
| EC Number | 243-744-3 |
| MeSH | titanium+hydroxide |
| PubChem CID | 88494 |
| UNII | W9EOP89V8G |
| CompTox Dashboard (EPA) | DTXSID30893907 |
- InChI: InChI=1S/4H2O.Ti/h4*1H2;/q;;;;+4/p-4 Key: LLZRNZOLAXHGLL-UHFFFAOYSA-J
- SMILES: O[Ti](O)(O)O

Properties
| Chemical formula | Ti(OH)_{4} |
| Molar mass | 115.90 g/mol |
| Appearance | White crystals |
- Except where otherwise noted, data are given for materials in their standard state (at 25 °C [77 °F], 100 kPa). Infobox references

Titanic acid is a general name for a family of chemical compounds of the elements titanium, hydrogen, and oxygen, with the general formula [TiO_{x}(OH)_{4−2x}]_{n}. Various simple titanic acids have been claimed, mainly in the older literature. No crystallographic and little spectroscopic support exists for these materials. Some older literature refers to titanium dioxide (TiO_{2}) as titanic acid, and the dioxide forms an unstable hydrate when TiCl_{4} hydrolyzes.

- Metatitanic acid (H_{2}TiO_{3}),
- Orthotitanic acid (H_{4}TiO_{4}) or Ti(OH)_{4}. It is described as a white salt-like powder under "TiO_{2}·2.16H_{2}O".
- Peroxotitanic acid (Ti(OH)_{3}O_{2}H) has also been described as resulting from the treatment of titanium dioxide in sulfuric acid with hydrogen peroxide. The resulting yellow solid decomposes with loss of O_{2}.
- Pertitanic acid (H_{2}TiO_{4})
- Pertitanic acid ([TiO(H_{2}O_{2})]^{2+})
