= Bruce Hapke =

American planetary scientist (born 1931)

Bruce William Hapke (born February 17, 1931) is a noted American planetary scientist, currently a professor emeritus at the University of Pittsburgh and a specialist in bidirectional reflectance spectroscopy.

== Career ==
Born in Racine, Wisconsin, Hapke earned a B.S. in physics from the University of Wisconsin–Madison in 1953. He was awarded his Ph.D. in engineering physics from Cornell University in 1962. Hapke was a research associate at the Center for Radiophysics and Space Research at Cornell University from 1960 to 1967. In 1967, he became a professor in the Department of Geology and Planetary Science at the University of Pittsburgh. In the course of his long and distinguished career, Hapke has taken part in Mariner 10, Viking and Apollo missions.

He is a past chairman of the Division for Planetary Sciences of the American Astronomical Society. Dr. Hapke is currently a professor emeritus at the University of Pittsburgh.

== Awards and honors ==
- Elected a Legacy Fellow of the American Astronomical Society in 2020
- Hapkeite, a lunar mineral, was named in his honor
- Asteroid 3549 Hapke
- Awarded the Kuiper Prize in 2001, the most distinguished award given by the American Astronomical Society's Division for Planetary Sciences
- Fellow of the American Geophysical Union
