= Platinum silicide =

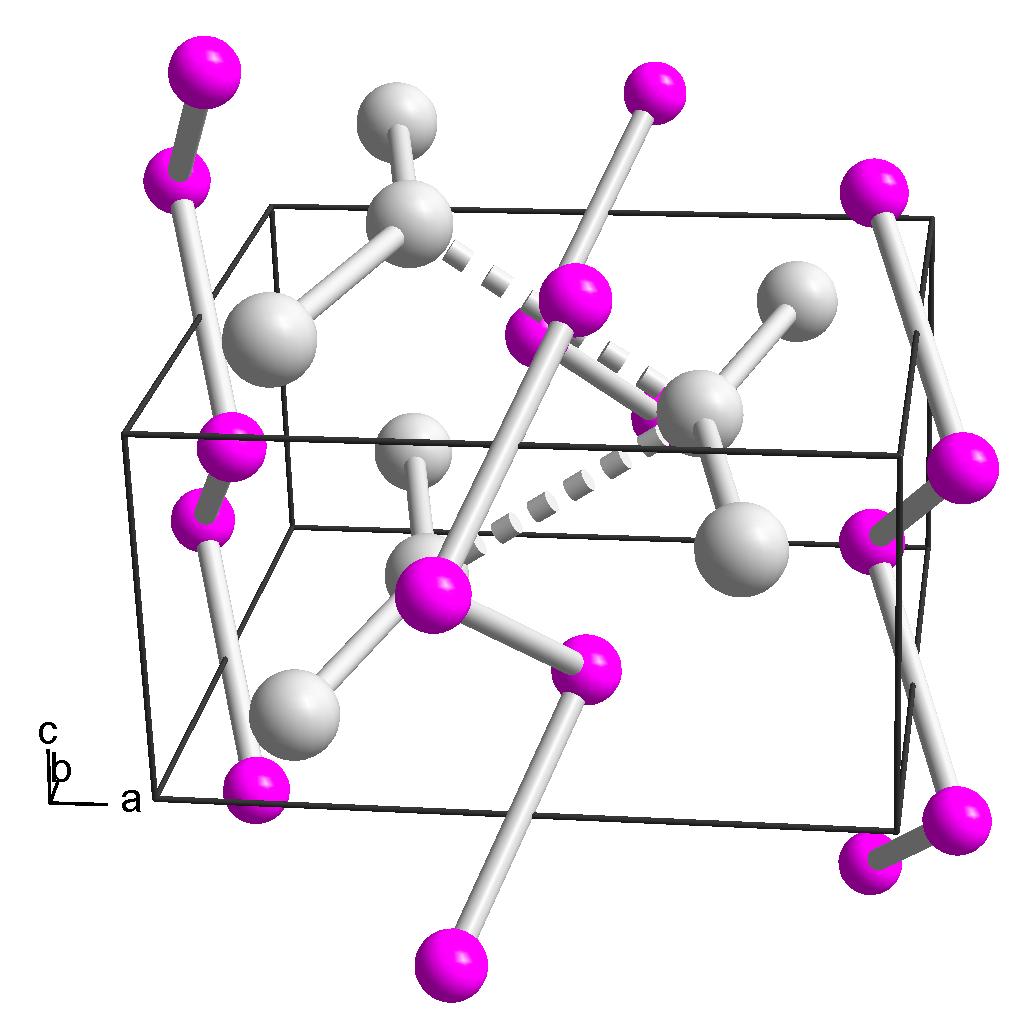

Names
- IUPAC name Platinum silicide

Identifiers
CAS Number	12137-83-6
3D model (JSmol)	Interactive image
ChemSpider	8035039
PubChem CID	9859339
- InChI: InChI=1S/Pt.Si Key: XRZCZVQJHOCRCR-UHFFFAOYSA-N
- SMILES: [Si].[Pt]

Properties
Chemical formula	PtSi
Molar mass	223.169 g·mol^{−1}
Appearance	Orthorhombic crystals
Density	12.4 g/cm^{3}
Melting point	1,229 °C (2,244 °F; 1,502 K)

Structure
Crystal structure	Orthorhombic
Space group	Pnma (No. 62), oP8
Lattice constant	a = 0.5577 nm, b = 0.3587 nm, c = 0.5916 nm
Formula units (Z)	4

Hazards
Flash point	Non-flammable
- Except where otherwise noted, data are given for materials in their standard state (at 25 °C [77 °F], 100 kPa). (what is ?) Infobox references

Platinum silicide, also known as platinum monosilicide, is the inorganic compound with the formula PtSi. It is a semiconductor that turns into a superconductor when cooled to 0.8 K.

== Structure and bonding ==
The crystal structure of PtSi is orthorhombic, with each silicon atom having six neighboring platinum atoms. The distances between the silicon and the platinum neighbors are as follows: one at a distance of 2.41 angstroms, two at a distance of 2.43 angstroms, one at a distance of 2.52 angstroms, and the final two at a distance of 2.64 angstroms. Each platinum atom has six silicon neighbors at the same distances, as well as two platinum neighbors, at a distance of 2.87 and 2.90 angstroms. All of the distances over 2.50 angstroms are considered too far to really be involved in bonding interactions of the compound. As a result, it has been shown that two sets of covalent bonds compose the bonds forming the compound. One set is the three center Pt–Si–Pt bond, and the other set the two center Pt–Si bonds. Each silicon atom in the compound has one three center bond and two center bonds. The thinnest film of PtSi would consist of two alternating planes of atoms, a single sheet of orthorhombic structures. Thicker layers are formed by stacking pairs of the alternating sheets. The mechanism of bonding between PtSi is more similar to that of pure silicon than pure platinum or Pt_{2}Si, though experimentation has revealed metallic bonding character in PtSi that pure silicon lacks.

== Synthesis ==
=== Methods ===
PtSi can be synthesized in several ways. The standard method involves depositing a thin film of pure platinum onto silicon wafers and heating in a conventional furnace at 450–600 °C for a half an hour in inert ambients. The process cannot be carried out in an oxygenated environment, as this results in the formation of an oxide layer on the silicon, preventing PtSi from forming.

A secondary technique for synthesis requires a sputtered platinum film deposited on a silicon substrate. Due to the ease with which PtSi can become contaminated by oxygen, several variations of the methods have been reported. Rapid thermal processing has been shown to increase the purity of PtSi layers formed. Lower temperatures (200–450 °C) were also found to be successful, higher temperatures produce thicker PtSi layers, though temperatures in excess of 950 °C formed PtSi with increased resistivity due to clusters of large PtSi grains.

=== Kinetics ===
Despite the synthesis method employed, PtSi forms in the same way. When pure platinum is first heated with silicon, Pt_{2}Si is formed. Once all the available Pt and Si are used and the only available surfaces are Pt_{2}Si, the silicide will begin the slower reaction of converting into PtSi. The activation energy for the Pt_{2}Si reaction is around 1.38 eV, while it is 1.67 eV for PtSi.

Oxygen is extremely detrimental to the reaction, as it will bind preferably to Pt, limiting the sites available for Pt–Si bonding and preventing the silicide formation. A partial pressure of O_{2} as low at 10^{−7} has been found to be sufficient to slow the formation of the silicide. To avoid this issue inert ambients are used, as well as small annealing chambers to minimize amount of potential contamination. The cleanliness of the metal film is also extremely important, and unclean conditions result in poor PtSi synthesis.

In certain cases an oxide layer can be beneficial. When PtSi is used as a Schottky barrier, an oxide layer prevents wear of the PtSi.

== Applications ==
PtSi is a semiconductor and a Schottky barrier with high stability and good sensitivity, and can be used in infrared detection, thermal imaging, or ohmic and Schottky contacts. Platinum silicide was most widely studied and used in the 1980s and 90s, but has become less commonly used, due to its low quantum efficiency. PtSi is now most commonly used in infrared detectors, due to the large size of wavelengths it can be used to detect. It has also been used in detectors for infrared astronomy. It can operate with good stability up to 0.05 °C. Platinum silicide offers high uniformity of arrays imaged. The low cost and stability makes it suited for preventative maintenance and scientific infrared imaging.

== See also ==
- HgCdTe
- Indium antimonide
