= Silicide =

Chemical compound that combines silicon and a more electropositive element

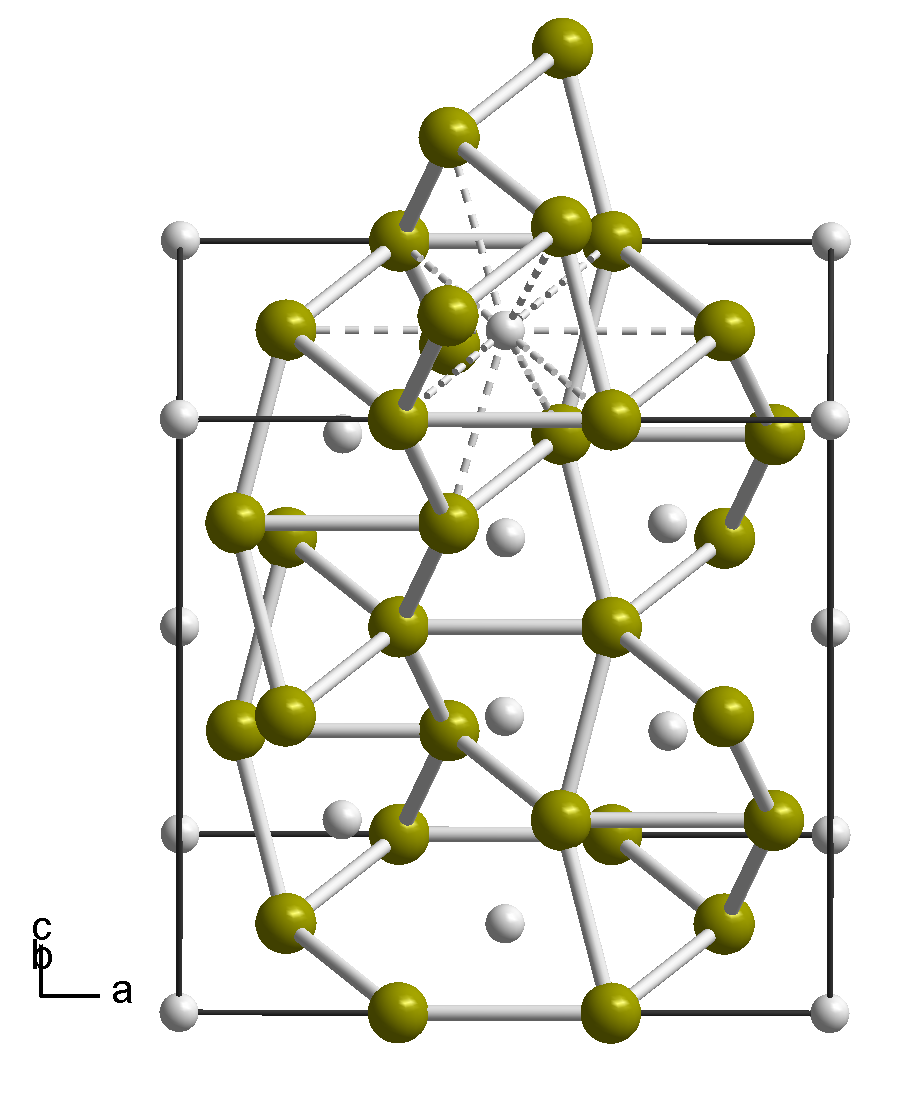
Structure of titanium disilicide (Ti = white spheres).

A silicide is a type of chemical compound that combines silicon and a usually more electropositive element.

Silicon is more electropositive than carbon. In terms of their physical properties, silicides are structurally closer to borides than to carbides. Because of size differences however silicides are not isostructural with borides and carbides.

Bonds in silicides range from conductive metal-like structures to covalent or ionic. Silicides of all non-transition metals have been described except beryllium. Silicides are used in interconnects.

== Structure ==
Silicon atoms in silicides can have many possible organizations:

- Isolated silicon atoms: electrically conductive (or semiconductive) CrSi, MnSi, FeSi, CoSi, Cu_{5}Si, (V,Cr,Mn)_{3}Si, Fe_{3}Si, Mn_{3}Si, Mg_{2}(Si,Ge,Sn,Pb), (Ca,Ru,Ce,Rh,Ir,Ni)_{2}Si
- Si_{2} pairs: U_{3}Si_{2}, hafnium and thorium silicides
- Si_{4} tetrahedra: KSi, RbSi, CsSi
- Si_{n} chains: USi, (Ti, Zr, Hf, Th, Ce, Pu)Si, CaSi, SrSi, YSi
- Planar hexagonal graphite-like Si layers: β-USi_{2}, silicides of other lanthanoids and actinoids
- Corrugated hexagonal Si layers: CaSi_{2}
- Open three-dimensional Si skeletons: SrSi_{2}, ThSi_{2}, α-USi_{2}

== Preparation and reactivity ==
Most silicides are produced by direct combination of the elements. However, the process is extremely exothermic and control of the reaction poor. In rare cases, a metal oxide can undergo silicobaric reduction, in which pure silicon deoxygenates the metal to a silicon oxide, which is then removed by a vacuum. Alternatively, molten aluminum or copper are adequate solvents for the alloying.

A silicide prepared by a self-aligned process is called a salicide. This is a process in which silicide contacts are formed only in those areas in which deposited metal (which after annealing becomes a metal component of the silicide) is in direct contact with silicon, hence, the process is self-aligned. It is commonly implemented in MOS/CMOS processes for ohmic contacts of the source, drain, and poly-Si gate.

=== Alkali and alkaline earth metals ===
Group 1 and 2 silicides e.g. Na_{2}Si and Ca_{2}Si react with water, yielding hydrogen and/or silanes. At Consumer Electronics Show (CES) 2012 a safe and eco-friendly 1kWh or 3kWh capacity mobile phone charger with sodium silicide that runs on water has introduced for 'people who spend time away from the electricity grid'. Any type of water can be used, including salt water and it can even run on puddle water providing it isn't thickened with mud or any other sediment.

Magnesium silicide reacts with hydrochloric acid to give silane:

Mg_{2}Si + 4 HCl → SiH_{4} + 2 MgCl_{2}

Group 1 silicides are even more reactive. For example, sodium silicide, Na_{2}Si, reacts rapidly with water to yield sodium silicate, Na_{2}SiO_{3}, and hydrogen gas. Rubidium silicide is pyrophoric, igniting in contact with air.

=== Transition metals and other elements ===
The transition metal silicides are usually inert to aqueous solutions. At red heat, they react with potassium hydroxide, fluorine, and chlorine. Mercury, thallium, bismuth, and lead are immiscible with liquid silicon.

== Applications ==
Silicide thin films have applications in microelectronics due to their high electrical conductivity, thermal stability, corrosion resistance, and compatibility with photolithographic wafer processes. For example silicides formed over layers of polysilicon, called polycides, are commonly used as an interconnect material in integrated circuits for their high conductivity. Silicides formed through the salicide process also see use as a low work function metal in ohmic and Schottky contacts. High work function metals are often not ideal for use in metal–semiconductor junctions directly due to fermi–level pinning where the Schottky barrier potential of the junction becomes locked around 0.7–0.8V. For this reason low forward-voltage Schottky diodes and ohmic interconnects between a semiconductor and a metal often utilize a thin layer of silicide at the metal–semiconductor interface.

== List (incomplete) ==
- Nickel silicide, NiSi
- Sodium silicide, NaSi
- Magnesium silicide, Mg_{2}Si
- Platinum silicide, PtSi (platinum is actually more electronegative than silicon)
- Titanium silicide, TiSi_{2}
- Tungsten silicide, WSi_{2}
- Molybdenum disilicide, MoSi_{2}
- Neptunium silicide, NpSi_{2}

== See also ==
- Binary compounds of silicon
