= Titanium disilicide =

Names
- IUPAC name Titanium disilicide
- Other names Titanium silicide

Identifiers
CAS Number	12039-83-7
3D model (JSmol)	Interactive image
ChemSpider	4891882
ECHA InfoCard	100.031.719
EC Number	234-904-3
PubChem CID	6336889
CompTox Dashboard (EPA)	DTXSID70894998
- InChI: InChI=1S/2Si.Ti Key: DFJQEGUNXWZVAH-UHFFFAOYSA-N
- SMILES: [Si]=[Ti]=[Si]

Properties
Chemical formula	TiSi_{2}
Molar mass	104.038 g/mol
Appearance	black orthorhombic crystals
Density	4.02 g/cm^{3}
Melting point	1,470 °C (2,680 °F; 1,740 K)
Solubility in water	insoluble
Solubility	soluble in HF

Hazards
- GHS labelling
Pictograms	(GHS02: Flammable) (GHS07: Exclamation mark)
Signal word	Warning
Hazard statements	H228, H315, H319, H335
Precautionary statements	P210, P240, P241, P261, P264, P271, P280, P302+P352, P304+P340, P305+P351+P338, P312, P321, P332+P313, P337+P313, P362, P370+P378, P403+P233, P405, P501
- Safety data sheet (SDS)

Related compounds
Other cations	Zirconium disilicide Hafnium disilicide
- Except where otherwise noted, data are given for materials in their standard state (at 25 °C [77 °F], 100 kPa). verify (what is ?) Infobox references

Titanium disilicide (TiSi_{2}) is an inorganic chemical compound of titanium and silicon.

== Preparation ==
Titanium disilicide can be obtained from the reaction between titanium or titanium hydride with silicon.

Ti + 2 Si → TiSi_{2}

It is also possible to prepare it aluminothermically by the ignition of aluminium powder, sulfur, silicon dioxide, and titanium dioxide or potassium hexafluorotitanate, K_{2}TiF_{6}, by electrolysis of a melt of potassium hexafluorotitanate and titanium dioxide, or by reaction of titanium with silicon tetrachloride.

Another method is the reaction of titanium tetrachloride with silane, dichlorosilane or silicon.

TiCl_{4} + 2 SiH_{4} → TiSi_{2} + 4 HCl + 2 H_{2}
TiCl_{4} + 2 SiH_{2}Cl_{2} + 2 H_{2} → TiSi_{2} + 8 HCl
TiCl_{4} + 3 Si → TiSi_{2} + SiCl_{4}

== Uses ==
Titanium silicide is used in the semiconductor industry. It is typically grown by means of salicide technology over silicon and polysilicon lines to reduce the sheet resistance of local transistors connections. In the microelectronic industry it is typically used in the C54 phase.
