= Nido =

Nido may refer to:

- Nido (brand), a brand of powdered milks
- Nido Creek, a creek in British Columbia, Canada
- Nido Formation, a geological formation in British Columbia, Canada

== People with the name ==
- Alberto A. Nido (1919–1991), American Air Force officer
- Miguel Nido (born 1963), Puerto Rican tennis player
- Tomás Nido (born 1994), Puerto Rican baseball player
- Nido Pavitra, Indian politician
- Nido Qubein (born 1948), American Lebanese-Jordanian businessman and motivational speaker
- Nido Taniam (1990s–2014), Indian student and murder victim

== Chemistry ==
- Nido cluster, a type of deltahedral atom cluster where one vertex is missing. The descriptor nido- is typically applied boranes, derivatives such as carboranes, and deltahedral metal cluster compounds such as stannides, plumbides and bismuth polycations. The term is usually used in the context of polyhedral skeletal electron pair theory or systematic nomenclature in inorganic chemistry. From the Latin for nest, see Wiktionary:nido-.

== See also ==
- El Nido (disambiguation)
