= Arnold Guloy =

American chemist and researcher

- Education: University of the Philippines (B.S.); Iowa State University (PhD)
- Scientific career
- Workplaces: IBM TJ Watson Research Center; University of Houston
- Academic advisors: John Corbett (chemist)

Arnold Guloy is an American chemist and Professor of Chemistry at the University of Houston. He is an expert in the area of Zintl phases, crystal growth, materials discovery, and superconductivity.

== Education ==
Guloy completed his undergraduate studies at the University of the Philippines in 1985. He earned his doctoral degree at the Iowa State University in 1991. His thesis topic was studying the synthesis, structure, and properties of polar intermetallic tetrelides of the rare-earth and alkaline-earth metals. Guloy performed postdoctoral research at the IBM TJ Watson Research Center under the supervision of David Mitzi where he co-discovered conducting tin halides with a layered organic-based perovskite structure. These and similar materials are the basis of perovskite solar cells.

== Research and career ==
At the University of Houston, Guloy investigates the structural and physical properties of Zintl phases and intermetallic materials with a focus on transport properties and novel materials. He has been a professor of chemistry at the University of Houston since 1993 rising through the ranks to become the John and Rebecca Moores Professor at the University of Houston in 2015. In 1998 he was awarded an National Science Foundation CAREER Award. He was a visiting professor at Sun Yat-Sen University in 2015 and was awarded the Distinguished Visiting Scholar-Lecturer Award from Chungnam National University, Daejun, Korea in 2009.
