= Stannide =

Intermetallic compound made with tin and other metals

A stannide can refer to an intermetallic compound containing tin combined with one or more other metals; an anion consisting solely of tin atoms or a compound containing such an anion, or, in the field of organometallic chemistry an ionic compound containing an organotin anion. An alternative name for such a compound is stannanide.

== Binary alkali and alkaline earth stannides ==
When tin is combined with an alkali or alkaline earth metal some of the compounds formed have ionic structures containing monatomic or polyatomic tin anions (Zintl ions), such as Sn^{4−} in Mg_{2}Sn or Sn^{4−}_{9} in K_{4}Sn_{9}. Even with these metals not all of the compounds formed can be considered to be ionic with localised bonding, for example Sr_{3}Sn_{5}, a metallic compound, contains {Sn_{5}} square pyramidal units.

== Ternary alkali and alkaline earth stannides ==
Ternary (where there is an alkali or alkaline earth metal, a transition metal as well as tin, for example LiRh_{3}Sn_{5} and MgRuSn_{4}) have been investigated.

== Other metal stannides ==
Binary (involving one other metal) and ternary (involving two other metals) intermetallic stannides have been investigated. Niobium stannide, Nb_{3}Sn is perhaps the best known superconducting tin intermetallics. This is more commonly called "niobium–tin".

There are multiple rare earth stannides, including with dysprosium and yttrium.

== Stannide ions, Sn^{y−}_{x} ==
Some examples of stannide Zintl ions are listed below. Some of them contain 2-centre 2-electron bonds (2c-2e), others are "electron deficient" and bonding sometimes can be described using polyhedral skeletal electron pair theory (Wade's rules) where the number of valence electrons contributed by each tin atom is considered to be 2 (the s electrons do not contribute). There are some examples of silicide and plumbide ions with similar structures, for example tetrahedral Si^{4−}_{4}, the chain anion (Si^{2−})_{n}, Pb^{4−}_{4} and Pb^{4−}_{9}.

- Sn^{4−} found for example in Mg_{2}Sn.
- Sn^{4−}_{4}, tetrahedral with 2c-2e bonds e.g. in CsSn.
- Sn^{2−}_{4}, tetrahedral closo-cluster with 10 electrons (2n + 2).
- (Sn^{2−})_{n} zigzag chain polymeric anion with 2c-2e bonds found for example in BaSn.
- Sn^{2−}_{5} closo-cluster, 12 electrons (2n + 2), (i.e. trigonal bipyramidal) in (2,2,2-crypt-Na)_{2}Sn_{5}.
- (Sn^{4−}_{8})_{n} polymeric two-dimensional anion in NaSn_{2}.
- Sn^{4−}_{9} nido-cluster 22 electrons (2n + 4), capped square antiprismatic with as per polyhedral skeletal electron pair theory, in the intermetallic K_{4}Sn_{9}, and a distorted ion in the salt Na_{4}Sn_{9}·7 en.
- Sn^{3−}_{9} a paramagnetic, 21 electrons, closo- cluster anion (D_{3h} symmetry), 1 more electron than the 20 (2n + 2) predicted by polyhedral skeletal electron pair theory.
- (Sn^{7−}_{12})_{n} polymeric two-dimensional anion in Na_{7}Sn_{12}
