= Yttrium stannides =

Yttrium and tin form several yttrium stannide intermetallic compounds.

The most tin-rich is YSn_{3}, followed by YSn_{2}, Y_{11}Sn_{10}, Y_{5}Sn_{4}, and Y_{5}Sn_{3}. None survives above 1,940 °C (3,520 °F), at which point Y_{5}Sn_{3} melts congruently. The enthalpy of dissolution is similar to the stannides of other late lanthanoids, and the intermetallics' overall enthalpies of formation resemble silicides, not germanides or plumbides.

YSn_{3} is an electrical superconductor below 7 K (−447.07 °F). It was originally thought to be a Type I superconductor, but 7 K may actually be the strong-coupling regime, despite the low temperature. The density of electronic states has a local maximum at the Fermi level, composed of tin p and d orbitals. The intermetallic is difficult to form, slowly crystallizing from a mixture of Sn and YSn_{2} above 515 °C (959 °F). This may arise from competing allotropes near room temperature: although its crystal structure is certainly cubic, simulation indicates that both the tricopper auride (Pm3̅m) or aluminum-titanium alloy (I4/mmm) structures are stable under standard conditions.

YSn_{2} has unit cell sized 4.39×16.34×4.30 Å. Like DySn_{2}, it exhibits the zirconium disilicide crystal structure: layers of yttrium rhombohedra encapsulating tin atoms alternate with flat planes of tin. Doping with nickel puckers the planes, and Mössbauer spectroscopy suggests that it removes electron density from the tin s orbitals.

Y_{5}Sn_{3} has the hexagonal manganese silicide crystal structure, with unit cell 8.88×6.52×0.73 Å.
