= Totché =

Traditional Swiss cake

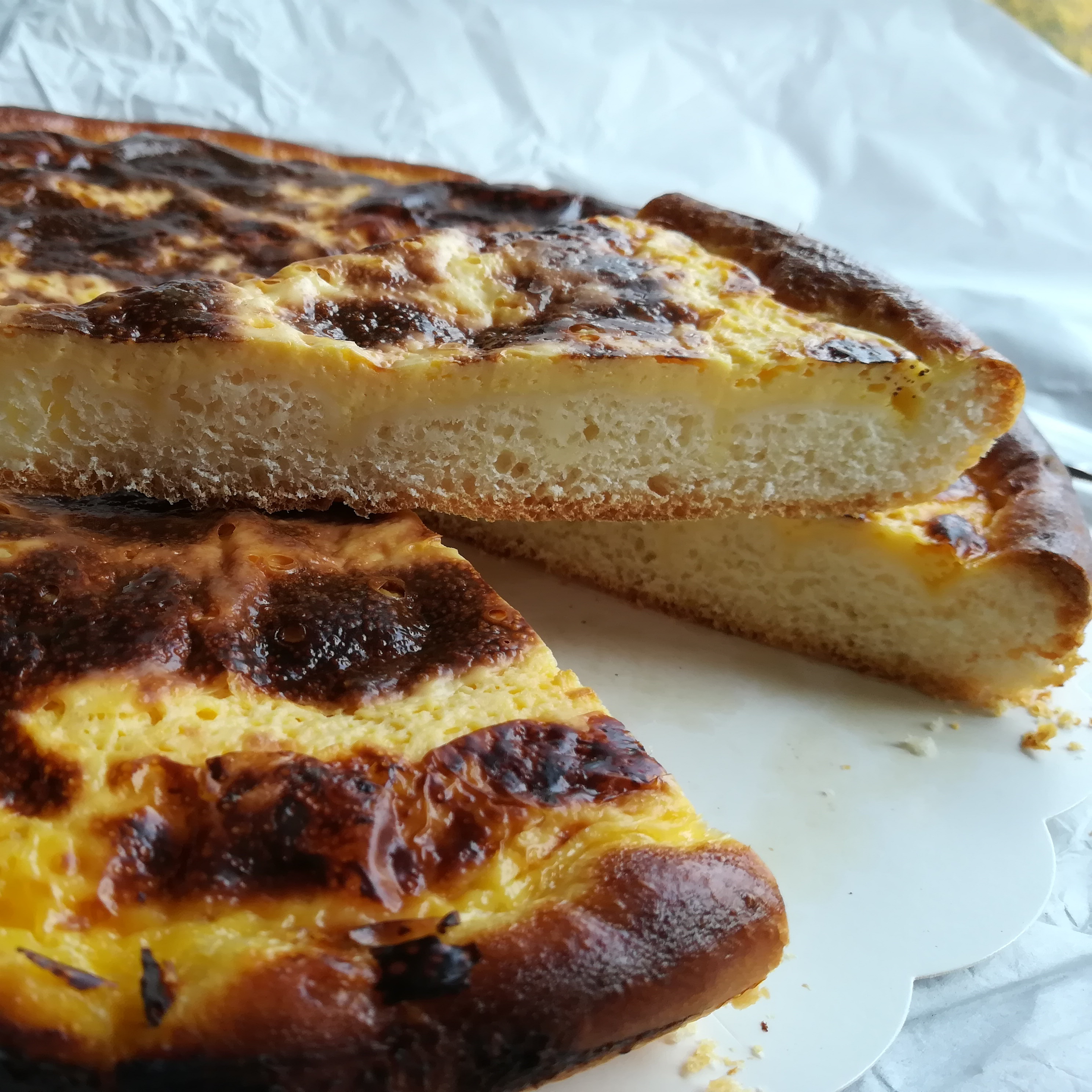
- Alternative names: toetché, toitché
- Type: cake
- Course: appetizer
- Place of origin: Switzerland
- Region or state: Canton of Jura
- Main ingredients: flour, eggs, sour cream

Totché (sometimes also toetché) is a traditional cake from the Canton of Jura, in Switzerland. The cake is made of leavened dough and covered with sour cream-based mix. While this can be eaten all year round, it is particularly popular around local festivities such as St. Martin's Day.
