= Coconut milk powder =

Culinary ingredient

Coconut cream (milk) powder

Coconut milk powder is a fine, white powder used in Southeast Asian and other cuisines. Coconut milk powder is manufactured through the spray drying process of raw unsweetened coconut cream and is reconstituted with water for use in recipes that call for coconut milk. Many commercially available coconut milk powders list milk or casein among their ingredients. Some coconut milk powder formulations may have added ingredients such as maltodextrin, sodium caseinate, or trisodium phosphate.

== See also ==
- Powdered milk
