= Zintl phase =

Chemical reaction product

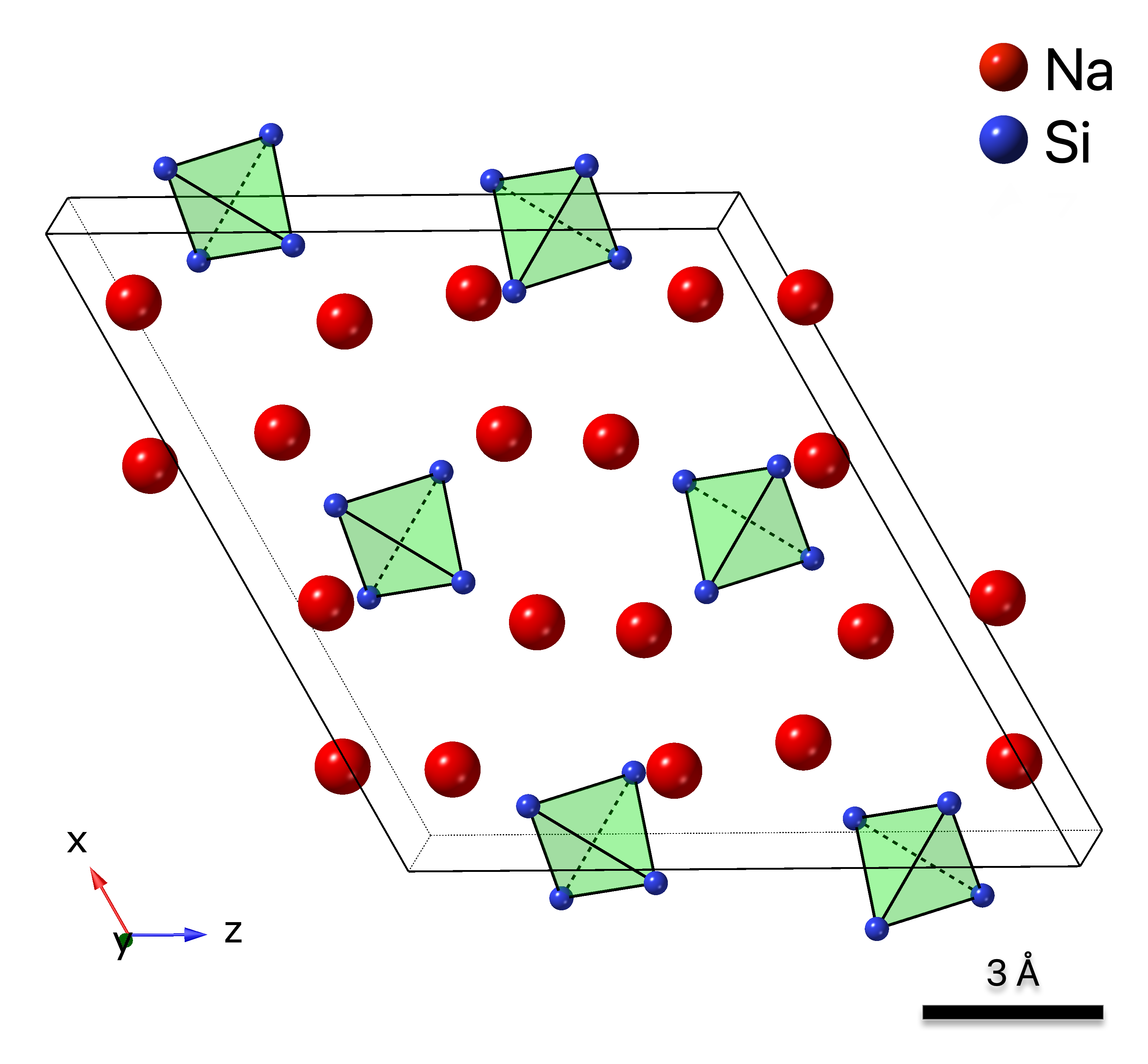
Example of a Zintl phase, Na_{4}Si_{4} (or NaSi), a monoclinic crystal structure with space group C2/c (no. 15). The polyanion (Si_{4})^{4-} tetrahedra are highlighted in green.

In chemistry, a Zintl phase is a product of a reaction between a group 1 (alkali metal) or group 2 (alkaline earth metal) and main group metal or metalloid (from groups 13, 14, 15, or 16). It is characterized by intermediate metallic–ionic bonding. Zintl phases are a subgroup of brittle, high-melting intermetallic compounds that are diamagnetic or exhibit temperature-independent paramagnetism and are poor conductors or semiconductors.

This type of solid is named after German chemist Eduard Zintl who investigated them in the 1930s. The term "Zintl phases" was first used by Laves in 1941. In his early studies, Zintl noted that there was an atomic volume contraction upon the formation of these products and realized that this could indicate cation formation. He suggested that the structures of these phases were ionic, with complete electron transfer from the more electropositive metal to the more electronegative main group element. The structure of the anion within the phase is then considered on the basis of the resulting electronic state. These ideas are further developed in the Zintl–Klemm–Busmann concept, where the polyanion structure should be similar to that of the isovalent element. Further, the anionic sublattice can be isolated as polyanions (Zintl ions) in solution and are the basis of a rich subfield of main group inorganic chemistry.

== History ==
A "Zintl phase" was first observed in 1891 by M. Joannis, who noted an unexpected green colored solution after dissolving lead and sodium in liquid ammonia, indicating the formation of a new product. It was not until many years later, in 1930, that the stoichiometry of the new product was identified as Na_{4}Pb_{9} by titrations performed by Zintl et al.; and it was not until 1970 that the structure was confirmed by crystallization with ethylenediamine (en) by Kummer.

In the intervening years and in the years since, many other reaction mixtures of metals were explored to provide a great number of examples of this type of system. There are hundreds of such compounds composed of group 14 elements and group 15 elements, plus dozens of others beyond those groups, all spanning a variety of different geometries. Corbett has contributed improvements to the crystallization of Zintl ions by demonstrating the use of chelating ligands, such as cryptands, as cation sequestering agents.

More recently, Zintl phase and ion reactivity in more complex systems, with organic ligands or transition metals, have been investigated, as well as their use in practical applications, such as for catalytic purposes or in materials science.

== Zintl phases ==
Zintl phases are intermetallic compounds that have a pronounced ionic bonding character. They are made up of a polyanionic substructure and group 1 or 2 counter ions, and their structure can be understood by a formal electron transfer from the electropositive element to the more electronegative element in their composition. Thus, the valence electron concentration (VEC) of the anionic element is increased, and it formally moves to the right in its row of the periodic table. Generally the anion does not reach an octet, so to reach that closed shell configuration, bonds are formed. The structure can be explained by the 8 − n rule (replacing the number of valence electrons, n, by VEC), making it comparable to an isovalent element. The formed polyanionic substructures can be chains (one-dimensional), rings, and other two-or three-dimensional networks or molecule-like entities.

The Zintl line is a hypothetical boundary drawn between groups 13 and 14. It separates the columns based on the tendency for group 13 elements to form metals when reacted with electropositive group 1 or 2 elements and for group 14 and above to form ionic solids. The 'typical salts' formed in these reactions become more metallic as the main group element becomes heavier.

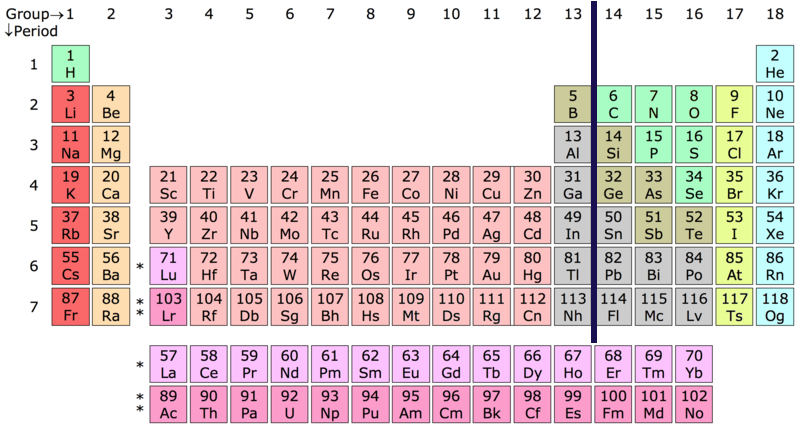
A periodic table illustrating the location of the Zintl line.

=== Synthesis ===
Zintl phases can be prepared in regular solid state reactions, usually performed under an inert atmosphere or in a molten salt solution. Typical solid state methods include direct reduction of corresponding oxides in solution phase reactions in liquid ammonia or mercury. The product can be purified in some cases via zone refining, though often careful annealing will result in large single crystals of a desired phase.

=== Characterization ===
Many of the usual methods are useful for determining physical and structural properties of Zintl phases. Some Zintl phases can be decomposed into a Zintl ion—the polyanion that composes the anionic substructure of the phase—and counter ion, which can be studied as described below. The heat of formation of these phases can be evaluated. Often their magnitude is comparable to those of salt formation, providing evidence for the ionic character of these phases. Density measurements indicate a contraction of the product compared to reactants, similarly indicating ionic bonding within the phase. X-ray spectroscopy gives additional information about the oxidation state of the elements, and correspondingly the nature of their bonding. Conductivity and magnetization measurements can also be taken. Finally, the structure of a Zintl phase or ion is most reliably confirmed via X-ray crystallography.

=== Examples ===
An illustrative example: There are two types of Zintl ions in K_{12}Si_{17}; 2x Si^{4−}_{4} (pseudo P_{4}, or according to Wade's rules, 12 = 2n + 4 skeletal-electrons corresponding to a nido-form of a trigonal-bipyramid) and 1x Si^{4−}_{9} (according to Wade's rules, 22 = 2n + 4 skeletal-electrons corresponding to a nido-form of a bicapped square antiprism)

Examples from Müller's 1973 review paper with known structures are listed in the table below.

Cation/Anion group	III	IV	V	VI	VII
Li	Li_{3}Al Li_{9}Al_{4} LiGa LiIn LiTl	Li_{22}Si_{5} Li_{7}Si_{2} Li_{22}Ge_{5} Li_{9}Ge_{4} Li_{22}Sn_{5} Li_{2}Sn_{5}	Li_{3}P LiP Li_{3}P_{7} LiP_{4} LiP_{5} LiP_{7} LiP_{15} Li_{3}As LiAs Li_{3}Sb Li_{3}Bi LiBi	Li_{2}S Li_{2}Se Li_{2}Te	LiCl LiBr LiI
Na	NaGa_{4} NaIn Na_{2}Tl (the polyanion is tetrahedral (Tl_{4})^{8−} Concept Tl^{2-} ~ P) NaTl (See Figure)	NaSi (the polyanion is tetrahedral (Si_{4})^{4−} Concept Si^{−} ~ P) Na_{x}Si_{136} (x ≤ 11) Na_{8}Si NaGe Na_{15}Pb_{4} Na_{13}Pb_{5} Na_{9}Pb_{4} NaPb	Na_{3}P NaP Na_{3}P_{7} Na_{3}P_{11} NaP_{7} NaP_{15} Na_{3}As Na_{3}Sb NaSb Na_{3}Bi NaBi	Na_{2}S Na_{2}Se Na_{2}Se_{2} Na_{2}Te	NaCl NaBr NaI
K	KIn_{4}	K_{12}Si_{17} K_{8}Si_{46} K_{8}Ge_{46} K_{8}Sn_{46} KPb KPb_{2}	K_{3}P KP K_{4}P_{6} K_{3}P_{7} K_{3}P_{11} KP_{15} K_{3}As K_{3}Sb KBi_{2}	K_{2}S K_{2}S_{2} K_{2}Se K_{2}Se_{2} K_{2}Te	KCl KBr KI
Rb	RbIn_{4}	RbSi RbGe RbSn RbPb	Rb_{4}P_{6} Rb_{3}P_{7} Rb_{3}P_{11} RbP_{7} RbP_{11} RbP_{15} Rb_{3}As Rb_{3}Bi RbBi_{2}	Rb_{2}S	RbCl RbBr RbI
Cs		CsSi CsGe CsSn CsPb	Cs_{2}P_{4} Cs_{4}P_{6} Cs_{3}P_{7} Cs_{3}P_{11} CsP_{7} CsP_{11} CsP_{15} Cs_{3}Sb Cs_{3}Bi CsBi_{2} Cs_{2}NaAs_{7} (See Figure)		CsCl CsBr CsI
Mg	Mg_{17}Al_{12} Mg_{5}Ga_{2} Mg_{2}Ga MgGa MgGa_{2} Mg_{2}Ga_{5} Mg_{3}In Mg_{5}In_{2} Mg_{2}In MgIn MgIn_{5} Mg_{2}Tl MgTl	Mg_{2}Si Mg_{2}Ge Mg_{2}Sn Mg_{2}Pb	Mg_{3}P_{2} Mg_{3}As_{2} Mg_{3}Sb_{2} Mg_{3}Bi_{2}	MgS MgSe MgTe MgTe_{2}	MgCl_{2} MgBr_{2} MgI_{2}
Ca	CaAl_{2} CaAl_{4} CaGa CaGa_{2} CaGa_{4} CaIn CaIn_{2} CaTl CaTl_{3}	CaSi CaSi_{2} Ca_{7}Ge Ca_{2}Ge CaGe_{2} Ca_{3}Sn Ca_{2}Sn CaSn CaSn_{3} Ca_{3}Pb Ca_{2}Pb Ca_{5}Pb_{3}		CaS CaSe CaTe	CaCl_{2} CaBr_{2} CaI_{2}
Sr	SrAl_{2} SrGa_{2} SrGa_{4} SrIn_{2} SrTl SrTl_{2} SrTl_{3}	Sr_{5}Si_{3} SrSi Sr_{4}Si_{7} SrSi_{2} Sr_{3}Ge_{4} SrGe_{2} SrSn SrPb_{3}	Sr_{3}P_{2} Sr_{3}P_{14} SrBi_{3}	SrS SrSe SrTe	SrCl_{2} SrBr_{2} SrI_{2}
Ba	BaAl_{4} BaGa_{2} BaGa_{4} BaIn_{2} BaIn_{4} BaTl_{2}	Ba_{5}Si_{3} BaSi Ba_{3}Si_{4} BaSi_{2} Ba_{2}Ge BaGe BaGe_{2} BaSn Ba_{5}Pb_{3} BaPb BaPb_{3}	Ba_{3}P_{2} BaP_{3} BaBi_{3}	BaS BaS_{3} BaSe BaTe	BaCl_{2} BaBr_{2} BaI_{2}

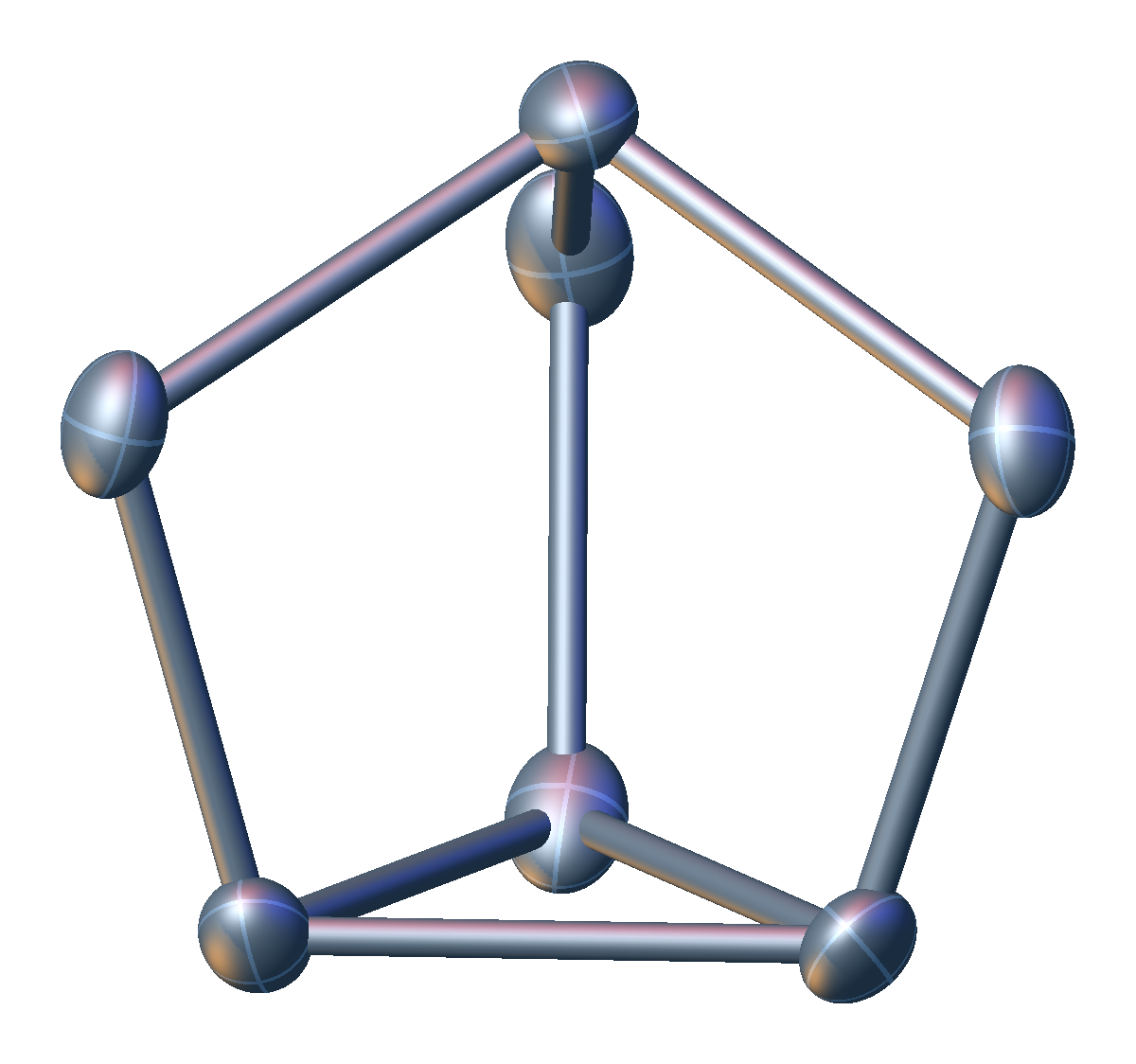
Structure of [As_{7}]^{3−} subunit in the Zintl phase Cs_{2}NaAs_{7}. The trianion adopts the structure of P_{4}S_{3}. Concept: As^{−} ~ S.

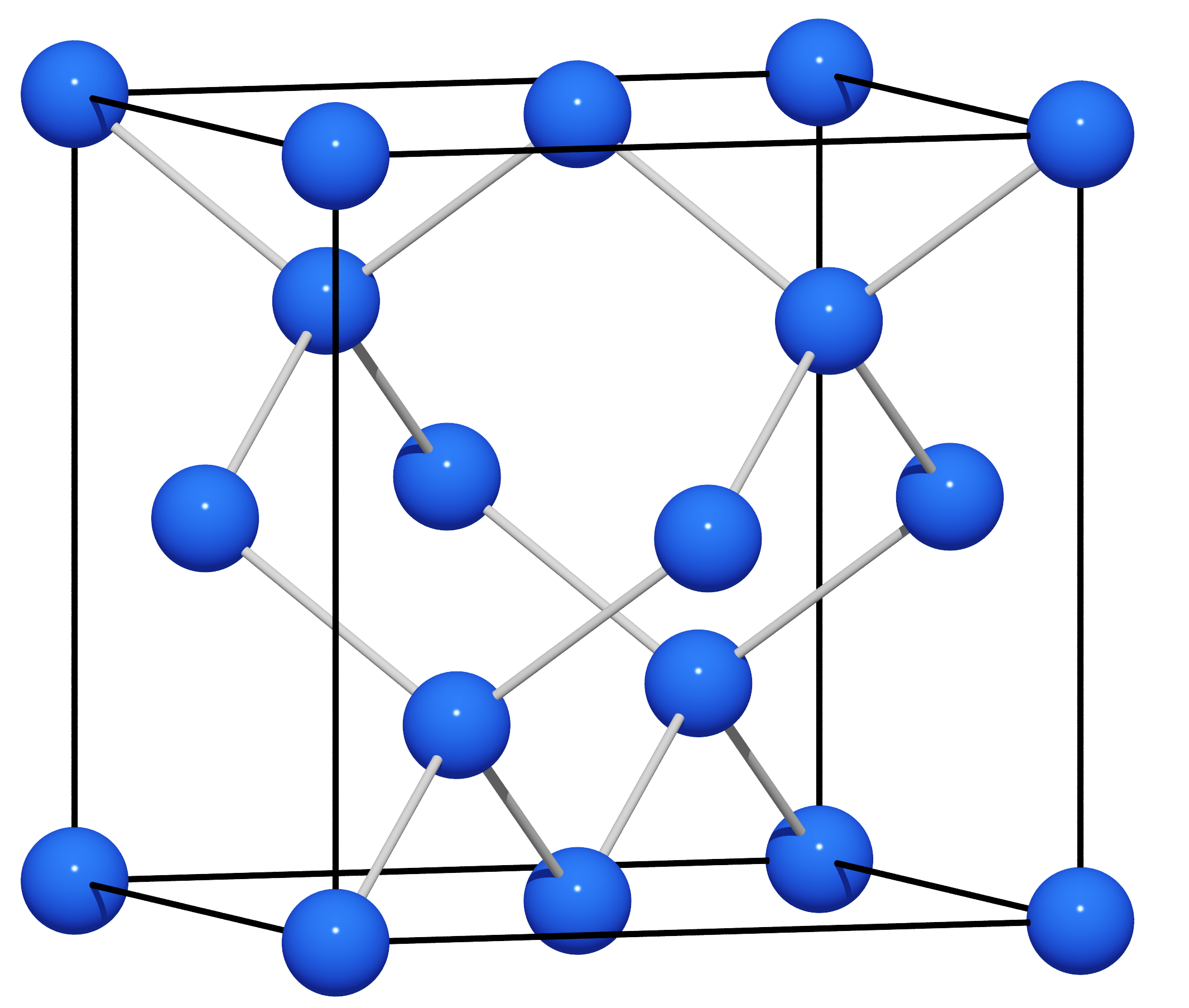
Diamondoid framework of Tl^{−} ions in NaTl. NaTl consists of a polyanion (—Tl^{−}—)_{n} with a covalent diamond structure. Na^{+} ions are located between the anions. Concept: Tl^{−} ~ C.

=== Exceptions ===
There are examples of a new class of compounds that, on the basis of their chemical formulae, would appear to be Zintl phases, for example, K_{8}In_{11}, which is metallic and paramagnetic. Molecular orbital calculations have shown that the anion is (In_{11})^{7−} and that the extra electron is distributed over the cations and, possibly, the anion antibonding orbitals. Another exception is the metallic InBi. InBi fulfills the Zintl phase requisite of element-element bonds but not the requisite of the polyanionic structure fitting a normal valence compound, i.e., the Bi–Bi polyanionic structure does not correspond to a normal valence structure such as the diamond Tl^{−} in NaTl.

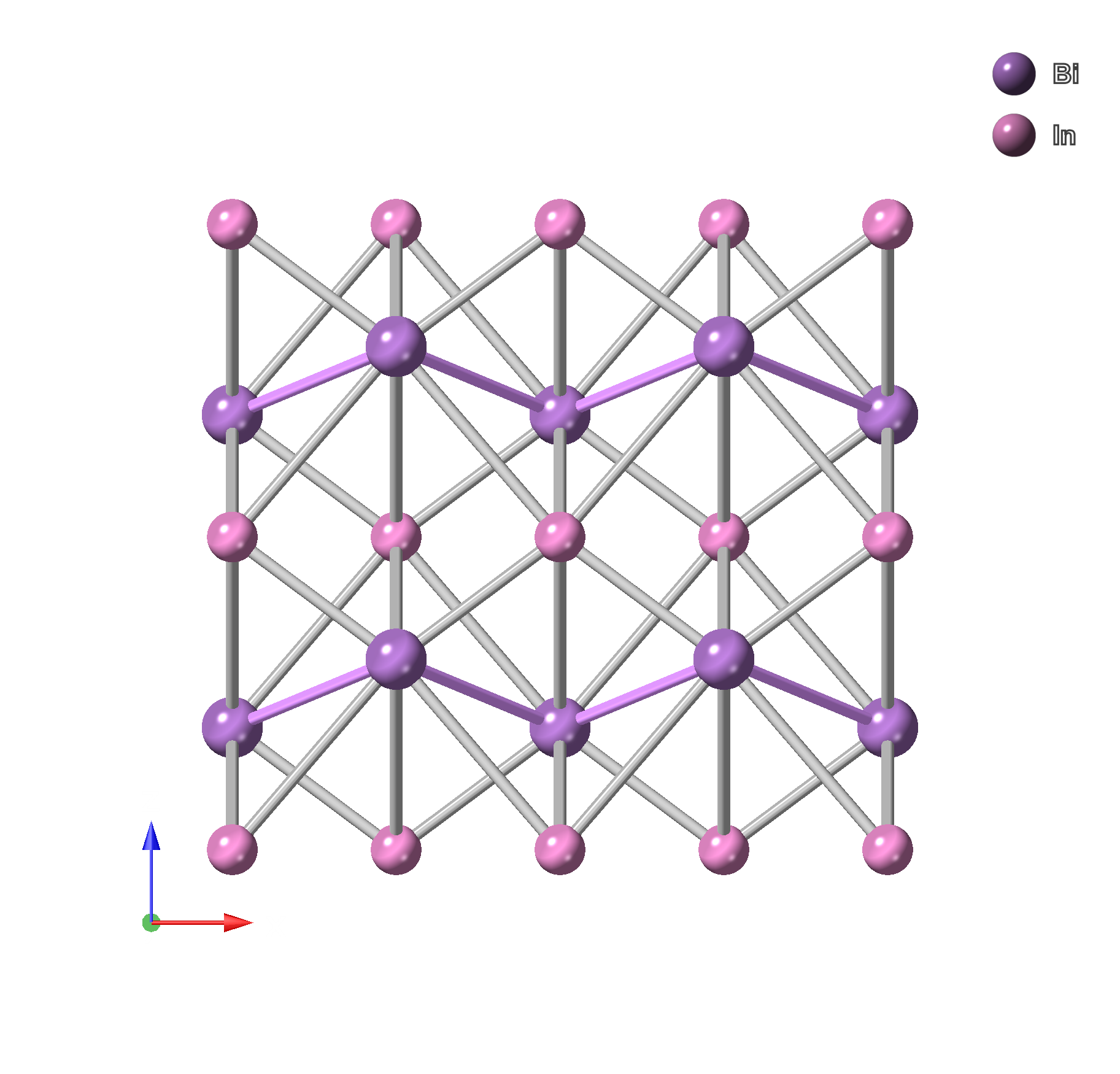
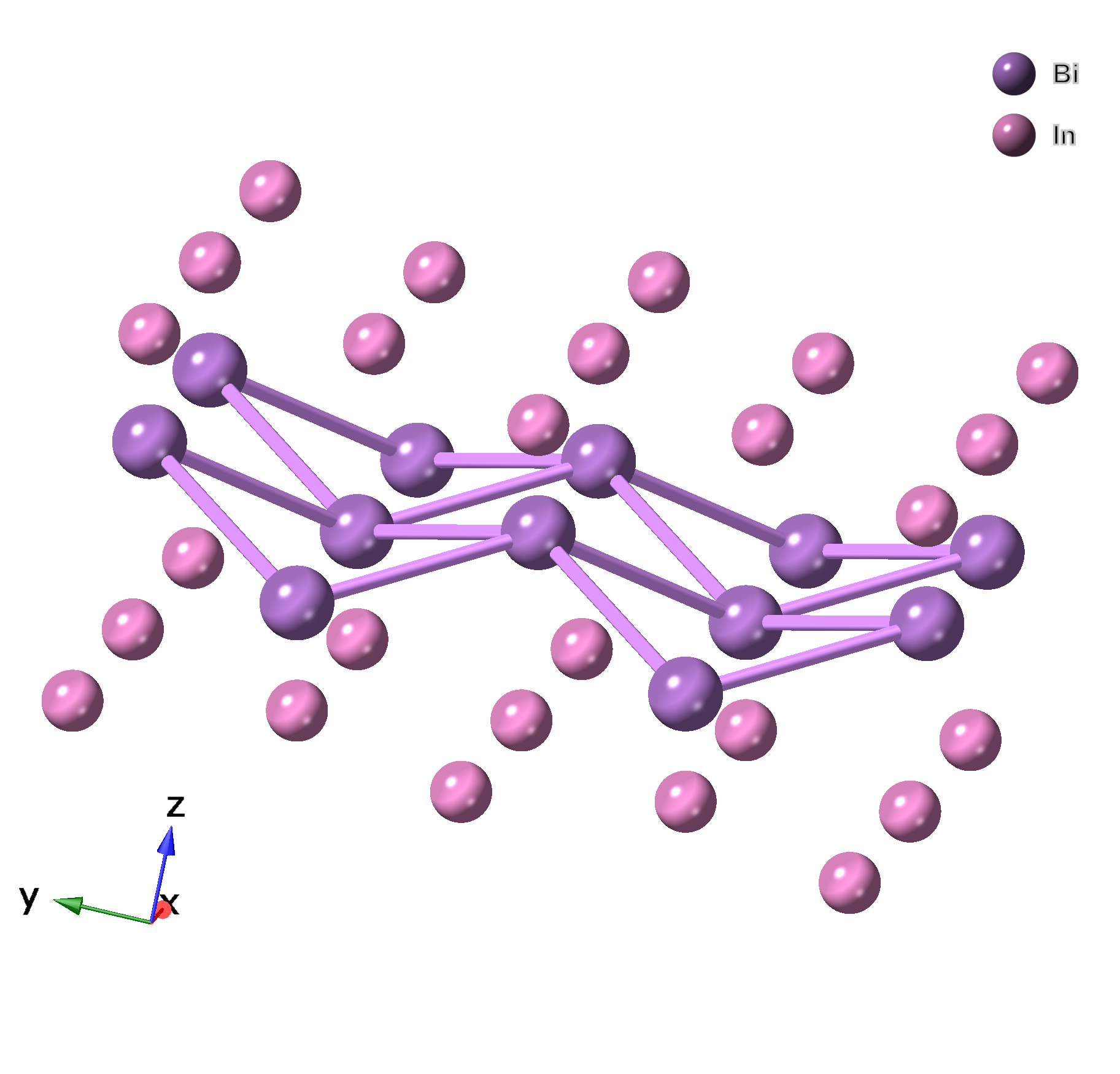
The crystal structure of InBi with and without the In–Bi bonds to highlight the Bi–Bi polyanionic structure.

== Zintl ions ==
Zintl phases that contain molecule-like polyanions will often separate into its constituent anions and cations in liquid ammonia, ethylenediamene, crown ethers, or cryptand solutions. Therefore, they are referred to as Zintl ions. The term 'clusters' is also used to emphasize them as groups with homonuclear bonding. The structures can be described by Wade's rules and occupy an area of transition between localized covalent bonds and delocalized skeletal bonding. Beyond the "aesthetic simplicity and beauty of their structures" and distinctive electronic properties, Zintl ions are also of interest in synthesis because of their unique and unpredictable behavior in solution.

The largest subcategory of Zintl ions is homoatomic clusters of group 14 or 15 elements. Some examples are listed below.

Many examples similarly exist for heteroatomic clusters where the polyanion is composed of greater than one main group element. Some examples are listed below. Zintl ions are also capable of reacting with ligands and transition metals, and further 'heteroatomic examples are discussed below (intermetalloid clusters). In some solvents, atoms exchange can occur between heteroatomic clusters. Additionally, it is notable that fewer large cluster examples exist.

=== Examples ===
==== Homoatomic clusters ====
- [Si_{4}]^{4−}
- [Si_{5}]^{2−}
- [Si_{9}]^{2−}
- [Si_{9}]^{4−}
- [Ge_{4}]^{4−}
- [Ge_{5}]^{2−}
- [Ge_{9}]^{3−}
- [Sn_{4}]^{4−}
- [Sn_{5}]^{2−}
- [Pb_{4}]^{4−}
- [Pb_{9}]^{4−}
- [P_{4}]^{2−}
- [P_{7}]^{3−}
- [P_{11}]^{3−}
- [As_{6}]^{4−}
- [As_{7}]^{3−}
- [Sb_{8}]^{8−}
- [Sb_{11}]^{3−}
- [Bi_{4}]^{2−}
- [Bi_{7}]^{3−}
- [Bi_{11}]^{3−}

==== Heteroatomic clusters ====
- AsP_{3}
- [Ge_{2}Sn_{2}]^{4−}
- [Sn_{2}Bi_{2}]^{2−}
- [Sn_{3}Bi_{3}]^{5−}
- [Pb_{2}Sb_{2}]^{2−}
- Sn_{5}Sb_{3}
- [InBi_{3}]^{2−}
- Bi_{14}Ge_{4}
- [GaBi_{3}]^{2−}
- [In_{4}Bi_{5}]^{3−}
- [TlSn_{8}]^{3−}
- [TlSn_{9}]^{3−}
- [Sb@In_{8}Sb_{12}]^{3−}
- [Sb@In_{8}Sb_{12}]^{5−}

=== Synthesis ===
Zintl ions are typically prepared through one of two methods. The first is a direct reduction route performed at low temperature. In this method, dry ammonia is condensed over a mixture of the two (or more) metals under inert atmosphere. The reaction initially produces solvated electrons in ammonia that reduce the more electronegative element over the course of the reaction. This reaction can be monitored by a color change from blue (solvated electrons) to the color of the Zintl phase. The second is method, performed at higher temperatures, is to dissolve a Zintl phase in liquid ammonia or other polar aprotic solvent like ethylenediamine (on rare occasions DMF or pyridine is used). Some Zintl ions, such as Si and Ge based ions, can only be prepared via this indirect method because they cannot be reduced at low temperatures.

=== Characterization ===
The structure of Zintl ions can be confirmed through X-ray crystallography. Corbett has also improved the crystallization of Zintl ions by demonstrating the use of chelating ligands such as cryptands, as cation sequestering agents.

Many of the main group elements have NMR active nuclei, thus NMR experiments are also valuable for gaining structural and electronic information; they can reveal information about the flexibility of clusters. For example, differently charged species can be present in solution because the polyanions are highly reduced and may be oxidized by solvent molecules. NMR experiments have shown a low barrier to change and thus similar energies for different states. NMR is also useful for gaining information about the coupling between individual atoms of the polyanion and with the counter-ion, a coordinated transition metal, or ligand. Nucleus independent chemical shifts can also be an indicator for 3D aromaticity, which causes magnetic shielding at special points.

Additionally, EPR can be used to measure paramagnetic in relevant clusters, of which there are a number of examples of the [E_{9}]^{3−} type, among others.

=== Reactivity ===
As highly reduced species in solution, Zintl ions offer many and often unexpected, reaction possibilities, and their discrete nature positions them as potentially important starting materials in inorganic synthesis.

In solution, individual Zintl ions can react with each other to form oligomers and polymers. In fact, anions with high nuclearity can be viewed as oxidative coupling products of monomers. After oxidation, the clusters may sometimes persist as radicals that can be used as precursors in other reactions. Zintl ions can oxidize without the presence of specific oxidizing agents through solvent molecules or impurities, for example in the presence of cryptand, which is often used to aid crystallization.

Zintl ion clusters can be functionalized with a variety of ligands in a similar reaction to their oligomerization. As such, functionalization competes with those reactions and both can be observed to occur. Organic groups, for example phenyl, TMS, and bromomethane, form exo bonds to the electronegative main group atoms. These ligands can also stabilize high nuclearity clusters, in particular heteroatomic examples.

Similarly in solids, Zintl phases can incorporate hydrogen. Such Zintl phase hydrides can be either formed by direct synthesis of the elements or element hydrides in a hydrogen atmosphere or by a hydrogenation reaction of a pristine Zintl phase. Since hydrogen has a comparable electronegativity as the post-transition metal it is incorporated as part of the polyanionic spatial structure. There are two structural motifs present. A monatomic hydride can be formed occupying an interstitial site that is coordinated by cations exclusively (interstitial hydride) or it can bind covalently to the polyanion (polyanionic hydride).

The Zintl ion itself can also act as a ligand in transition metal complexes. This reactivity is usually seen in clusters composed of greater than 9 atoms, and it is more common for group 15 clusters. A change in geometry often accompanies complexation; however zero electrons are contributed from the metal to the complex, so the electron count with respect to Wade's rules does not change. In some cases the transition metal will cap the face of the cluster. Another mode of reaction is the formation of endohedral complexes where the metal is encapsulated inside the cluster. These types of complexes lend themselves to comparison with the solid state structure of the corresponding Zintl phase. These reactions tend to be unpredictable and highly dependent on temperature, among other reaction conditions.

==== Examples ====
- Group 14 anions functionalized with organic groups: [Ge_{9}Mes]^{3−}, [Ge_{9}(CHCHCH_{2}NH_{2})_{2}]^{2−}, [(CH_{2}CH)Ge_{9}Ge_{9}(CHCH_{2})]^{4−}, [Ge_{9}(CHCHCHCH)Ge_{9}]^{6−}, [(CH_{2}CH)Ge_{9}(CH)_{4}Ge_{9}(CHCH_{2})]^{4−};
- Silated anions: Ge_{9}Hyp_{3}Tl, [Ge_{9}Hyp_{3}]^{−};
- Intermetalloid deltahedral clusters: [Co@Sn_{9}]^{4−}, [Ni@Pb_{10}]^{2−}, [Au@Pb_{12}]^{3−}, [Mn@Pb_{12}]^{3−}, [Rh_{3}@Sn_{24}]^{5−};
- Exo-coordinated transition metal complexes: [(η^{2}-Sn_{9})Hg(η^{2}-Sn_{9})]^{6−}, [Ge_{5}Ni_{2}(CO)_{3}]^{2−}, [Sn_{8}TiCp]^{3−}, [(tol)NbSn_{6}Nb(tol)]^{2−};
- [Ni_{5}Sb_{17}]^{4−} (Ni_{4}Sb_{4} ring inside Sb_{13} bowl).

== Electronic structure and bonding ==
=== Wade's rules ===
The geometry and bonding of a Zintl ion cannot be easily described by classical two electron two center bonding theories; however the geometries Zintl ions can be well described by Wade’s rules of boranes. Wade’s rules offer an alternative model for the relationship between geometry and electron count in delocalized electron deficient systems. The rules were developed to predict the geometries of boranes from the number of electrons and can be applied to these polyanions by replacing the BH unit with a lone pair. Some unique clusters of Ge occur in non-deltahedral shapes that cannot be described by Wade’s rules. The rules also become more convoluted in intermetallic clusters with transition metals and consideration needs to be taken for the location of the additional electrons.

=== Zintl–Klemm–Busmann concept ===
The Zintl–Klemm–Busmann concept describes how in an anionic cluster, the atoms arrange in typical geometries found for the element to the right of it on the periodic table. So “the anionic lattice is isometric with elemental lattices having the same number of valence electrons.” In this formulation, the average charge on each atom of the cluster can be calculated by:

$$\frac{\text{anion valence} + \text{cation valence} }{n_a} = \text{VEC}$$

where n_{a} is number of anion atoms and VEC is the valence electron concentration per anion atom, then:

$$8 - \text{VEC} = \text{number of bonds per anion atom.}$$

The number of bonds per anion predicts structure based on isoelectronic neighbor. This rule is also referred to as the 8 − n rule and can also be written as:

$$\frac{n_e + b_a - b_c}{n_a} = 8.$$

Not all phases follow the Zintl–Klemm–Busmann concept, particularly when there is a high content of either the electronegative or electropositive element. There are still other examples where this does not apply.

=== Electronic theory ===
Wade's rules are successful in describing the geometry of the anionic sublattice of Zintl phases and of Zintl ions but not the electronic structure. Other 'spherical shell models' with spherical harmonic wave functions for molecular orbitals—analogous to atomic orbitals—that describe the clusters as pseudo-elements. The Jellium model uses a spherical potential from the nuclei to give orbitals with global nodal properties. Again, this formulates the cluster as a 'super atom' with an electron configuration comparable to a single atom. The model is best applied to spherically symmetric systems, and two examples for which it works well are the icosahedral Al^{−}_{13} and [Sn@Cu_{12}@Sn_{20}]^{12−} clusters. DFT or ab initio molecular orbital calculations similarly treat the clusters with atomic, and correspondingly label them S, P, D etc. These closed shell configurations have prompted some investigation of 3D aromaticity. This concept was first suggested for fullerenes and corresponds to a 2(N+1)^{2} rule in the spherical shell model. An indicator of this phenomenon is a negative Nucleus Independent Chemical Shift (NICS) values of the center of the cluster or of certain additional high symmetry points.

== Use in catalysis and materials science ==
Some Zintl ions show the ability to activate small molecules. One example from Dehnen and coworkers is the capture of O_{2} by the intermetallic cluster [Bi_{9}{Ru(cod)}_{2}]^{3−}. Another ruthenium intertermetallic cluster, [Ru@Sn_{9}]^{6−}, was used as a precursor to selectively disperse the CO_{2} hydrogenation catalyst Ru-SnOx onto CeO_{2}, resulting in nearly 100% CO selectivity for methanation.

In materials science, Ge^{4−}_{9} has been used as a source of germanium in lithium ion batteries, where is can be deposited in a microporous layer of α-Ge. The discrete nature of Zintl ions opens the possibility for the bottom up synthesis of nanostructured semiconductors and the surface modification of solids. The oxidation and polymerization of Zintl ions may also be a source of new materials. For example, polymerization of Ge clusters was used to create guest free germanium clathrate, in other words a particular, pure Ge.

== See also ==
- Plumbide
- Stannide

== Additional resources ==
- Video of preparation of K_{4}Ge_{9} (subscription required)
