= Powdered eggs =

Fully dehydrated eggs

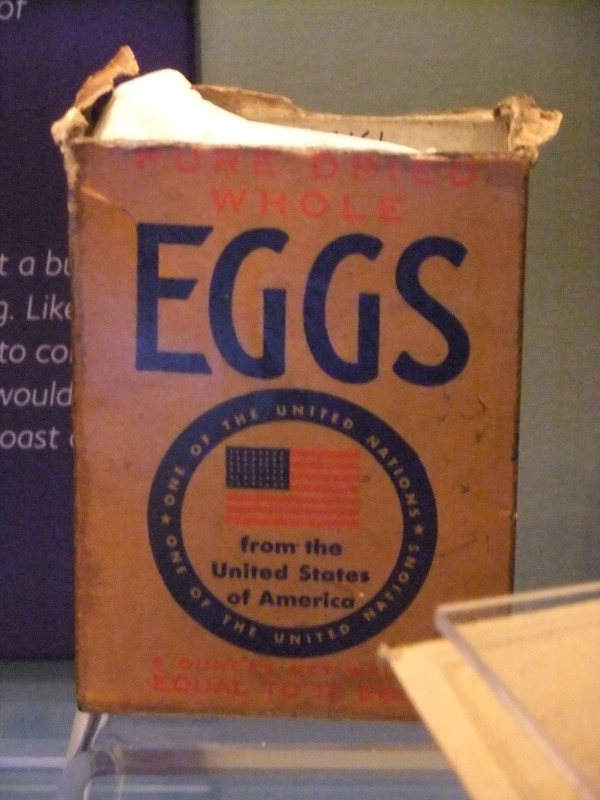
Pure dried whole eggs from the U.S., 1940s

A powdered egg is a fully dehydrated egg. Most powdered eggs are made using spray drying in the same way that powdered milk is made. First the eggs are cracked and separated from the shell. The egg yolk and white are beaten together and atomized into fine droplets by a spray nozzle that emits the droplets into a column of hot air to rapidly evaporate the moisture without cooking the egg. The use of a cyclone flow of air allows solid particles to be ejected from the drying column, falling to the sides and base of the drying tower to be collected.

The major advantages of powdered eggs over fresh eggs are the increased weight per volume of whole egg equivalent—reducing storage space required—the much longer shelf life, and not needing refrigeration. Powdered eggs can be used without rehydration when baking, and can be rehydrated to make dishes such as scrambled eggs and omelettes.

== History ==
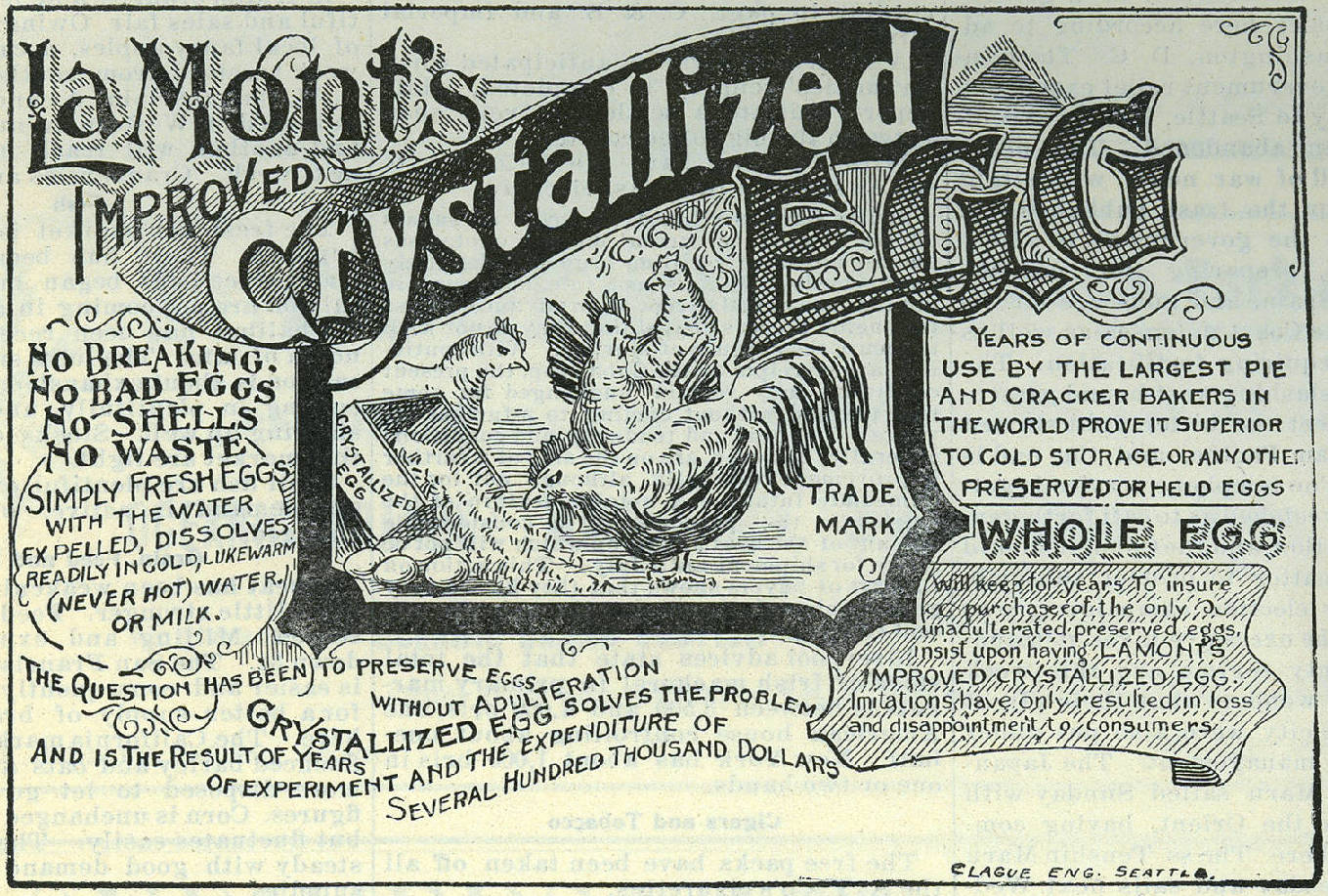
LaMont's Crystallized Eggs 1898 ad in Seattle, Washington

Dehydrated eggs advertisements appeared in the late 1890s in the United States. Powdered eggs appear in literature as a staple of camp cooking at least as early as 1912.

Powdered eggs, known also as dried eggs, were widely used in the United Kingdom during World War II when food (including both fresh and dried eggs) was rationed. While nutritious, they were not a culinary treat; Esther Rantzen, reminiscing about the time, wrote that there were few real eggs, and "I can still remember the disgusting taste of powdered egg". It was also part of military rations. Bob Hope joked during a USO show, "Fellows, the folks at home are having a terrible time about eggs. They can't get any powdered eggs at all. They've got to use the old-fashioned kind you break open".

== Quality ==
Powdered eggs have a storage life of 5 to 10 years when stored without oxygen in a cool storage environment.

The process of spray-drying eggs oxidizes some of the cholesterol content into oxysterol. It was found in a 1985 trial that feeding chickens with dried egg yolks or a cholesterol-free diet slightly reduced atherosclerosis of the aorta when compared with fresh egg yolks.

A 2022 study found that spray-drying mostly retained the high nutritional quality of pasteurized whole eggs without accumulating potentially harmful compounds.

=== Foaming power ===
Many types of cake requires trapping air in a matrix of beaten eggs (mainly the proteins in egg white) for its foamy texture. Drying eggs with heat reduces the ability of the reconstituted mixture to produce foam, but powdered eggs with reduced yolk content and a little sodium lauryl sulfate can produce foam as light as fresh whole eggs. (Yolk and other oils reduce the foaming ability of egg mixtures, whether fresh or reconstituted.)

With pure egg whites, freeze-drying retains much more foaming power than conventional spray-drying. A lower spray-drying temperature is associated with better preservation of foaming power.

== Related products ==
=== Powdered egg whites ===
Egg white can be dried alone for better foaming. The result is egg white powder.

The ingredient called egg white protein is virtually identical to egg white powder, as no additional step is employed to separate the protein in egg white from other components before drying. Dried egg white products often have their foaming ability compromised by the inadvertent inclusion of egg yolk. Adding phospholipase A2 appears to break down the contaminant and restore the foaming power.

== See also ==
- Food powder
- List of dried foods
