= Pomazánkové máslo =

Czech and Slovak dairy product

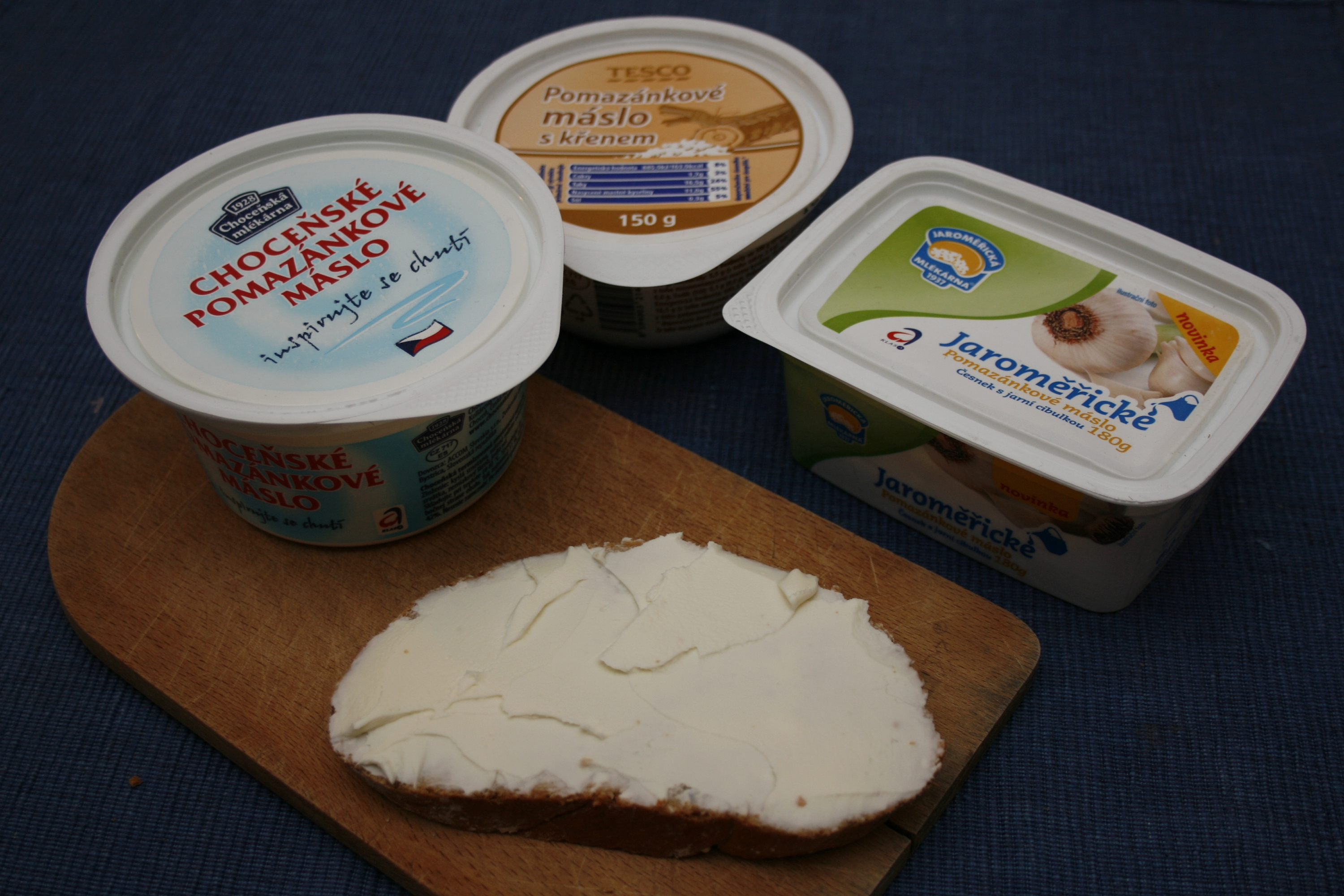
Three variants of Pomazánkové máslo.

Pomazánkové máslo (literally: "spread butter") is a traditional Czech and Slovak dairy product. It is a spread made from sour cream, milk powder and buttermilk powder. It also contains starch, salt and usually herb or similar flavoring. The Czech food regulator (Státní potravinářská inspekce) requires the pomazánkové máslo must consist of at least 31% milk fat and 42% milk solids. Milk fat cannot be replaced by vegetable fat.

Popular flavors include herbs (parsley, basil, oregano, marjoram, and chives), garlic, ham, bell pepper and horseradish.

The pomazánkové máslo was first made in a dairy located in Liberec in 1977. Annual Czech production is over 8,000 tons. Major producers are Madeta and Choceňská mlékárna.

European Union regulation has forbidden the pomazánkové máslo label because it contains the word "máslo" (butter). According to European regulations, only products containing more than 39% of milkfat can be called butter. The Slovak Republic accepted this decision immediately, whereas the Czech Republic did so after several court hearings.

In Slovakia, the new names for the product became "smotanová nátierka" (cream spread) and "roztierateľný tuk" (spreadable fat), while a Czech name wasn't initially established due to the hearings - however dairies announced that they would call their product "máslová pomazánka" (buttery spread) or "máslový krém" (buttery cream).

Nevertheless, at the beginning of 2013, the Ministry of Agriculture announced that the product would be named to just "tradiční pomazánkové" (literally: "traditional spreadable"), simply dropping the word "máslo" from the end of the product's name, and by the end of 2014, the new name had become widely adopted.
