= Kenneth Poeppelmeier =

American solid-state chemist

Kenneth R. Poeppelmeier
- Born: 1949 (age 76–77); St. Louis, Missouri, U.S.
- Education: University of Missouri (B.S.); Iowa State University (Ph.D.)
- Known for: Noncentrosymmetric and mixed-anion inorganic solids
- Awards: Fellow of the American Association for the Advancement of Science (1993); Fray International Sustainability Award (2023)
- Scientific career
- Fields: Inorganic chemistry, solid-state chemistry
- Workplaces: Northwestern University; Argonne National Laboratory; Exxon Research and Engineering Company; Samoa College
- Doctoral advisor: John D. Corbett

Kenneth R. Poeppelmeier (born 1949) is an American solid-state chemist who holds the Charles E. and Emma H. Morrison Professorship of Chemistry at Northwestern University. After a doctorate at Iowa State University, he spent six years in industrial research at Exxon Research and Engineering Company, and he moved to Northwestern in 1984. Between 2010 and 2020 he also held a joint appointment at Argonne National Laboratory.

His research deals with how inorganic solids, chiefly mixed metal oxides and compounds with more than one kind of anion, can be made, how their atoms are arranged, and what properties follow. Topics have included crystals that lack a center of symmetry and are used in nonlinear optics, cation ordering in perovskite oxides, transparent conducting oxides, and solids for catalysis and batteries. A 1998 review of noncentrosymmetric oxides that he wrote with P. Shiv Halasyamani was later featured by Chemistry of Materials among its papers cited more than 1,000 times. In 2016 his group and co-workers reported optical activity in a crystal grown from a racemic mixture, and in 2025 a collaboration that included his group reported a centrosymmetric crystal that absorbs left- and right-handed circularly polarized light unequally.

Poeppelmeier was an associate editor of Inorganic Chemistry from 1993 to 2013, and with Jan Reedijk he edited the multi-volume reference works Comprehensive Inorganic Chemistry II (2013) and Comprehensive Inorganic Chemistry III (2023). He became a fellow of the American Association for the Advancement of Science in 1993, and in 2016 Spain's Royal Academy of Exact, Physical and Natural Sciences named him a foreign corresponding member. Other recognition includes honorary membership of the Spanish Royal Society of Chemistry in 2017, the Tianshan Award for 2020 from the Xinjiang regional government, and the Fray International Sustainability Award from FLOGEN Stars Outreach in 2023.

== Early life and education ==
Poeppelmeier was born in St. Louis, Missouri, in 1949. He studied chemistry at the University of Missouri in Columbia and graduated with a B.S. in 1971. For the next three years he was a Peace Corps volunteer, teaching chemistry at Samoa College in Western Samoa. He then entered graduate school at Iowa State University, joined the group of John D. Corbett, and completed his Ph.D. in 1978. His doctoral papers with Corbett described reduced scandium chlorides containing metal–metal bonds, including the chain compound Sc_{5}Cl_{8}. In a later study published in 1985, Poeppelmeier, Shiou-Jyh Hwu and Corbett examined interstitial carbon atoms in a related compound, Sc_{7}Cl_{10}C_{2}.

== Career ==
In 1978 Poeppelmeier joined the corporate research laboratories of Exxon Research and Engineering Company and advanced from research chemist to senior staff chemist. Working with John Longo and Allan Jacobson, he prepared mixed metal oxides, determined their structures and tested them as heterogeneous catalysts. Papers from this period described calcium manganese oxides, CaMnO_{2.5} and Ca_{2}MnO_{3.5}, whose structures are perovskites with ordered oxygen vacancies.

He joined Northwestern's chemistry department in 1984 as an associate professor, became a full professor in 1988 and was appointed to the Morrison chair in 2010. From 1989 to 2000 he was associate director of the Science and Technology Center for Superconductivity, a National Science Foundation center shared by Northwestern, the University of Illinois Urbana-Champaign, the University of Chicago and Argonne. He was associate division director for science in Argonne's Chemical Sciences and Engineering Division from 2010 to 2020. From 2012 to 2020, he directed Northwestern's Center for Catalysis and Surface Science. Earlier, in 1988–89, he chaired the Solid State Subdivision of the American Chemical Society's Division of Inorganic Chemistry.

== Research ==
In a 2019 editorial in Science China Materials, Tsinghua University professor Yadong Li surveyed Poeppelmeier's work. Its references cover noncentrosymmetric crystals, oxygen-deficient and cation-ordered perovskites, oxide surfaces, transparent conducting oxides, phosphors and racemic crystals. The Spanish chemical society's journal, reporting his honorary membership, pointed to the breadth of the compounds his group had made, from halides, sulfides, antimonides and phosphates to oxyfluorides and many perovskite-type oxides, and to the electrical, magnetic, catalytic, optical and electrochemical behavior examined in them.

=== Noncentrosymmetric and optical materials ===
Only crystals without a center of inversion can show effects such as piezoelectricity, pyroelectricity and second-harmonic generation, so finding such structures is a goal in the search for optical materials. In their 1998 review, Poeppelmeier and Halasyamani, who was then his graduate student, sorted close to 600 noncentrosymmetric oxides listed in the 1996 Inorganic Crystal Structure Database by crystal class and by the coordination of their metal ions. The review appeared in a Chemistry of Materials special issue that Poeppelmeier guest-edited. Writing in 2024, the journal's editors highlighted its observation that roughly four in five of these oxides contain a cation prone to a second-order Jahn–Teller distortion or one in tetrahedral coordination, a pattern that suggested where to look for new examples. With collaborators he later co-wrote reviews of crystals for nonlinear optics in the deep ultraviolet and of borates as optical materials.

=== Perovskites, oxide surfaces and transparent conductors ===
A 1993 review from his group examined how two different cations are arranged on the B site of double perovskite oxides. With Laurence D. Marks and others he reported the atomic structure of a titanium-rich strontium titanate surface in Nature in 2002. Northwestern collaborations with Thomas Mason, Tobin J. Marks and Arthur Freeman explored chemical and thin-film routes to new transparent conducting oxides, and his group described hydrothermal methods for making delafossite-type oxides. His lecture at the 2017 Madrid session in his honor dealt with indium tin oxide and other conducting oxides in which other elements replace part of the indium or tin.

=== Mixed-anion compounds, catalysis and energy storage ===
Poeppelmeier has also worked on solids that pair oxide with fluoride or other anions. Along with six other authors, including professor Hiroshi Kageyama, he co-authored a 2018 review in Nature Communications that presented multiple-anion compounds as an expanding area of materials chemistry and physics. A 2016 collaborative study reported that magnesium ions could be inserted into and removed from a layered oxyfluoride, which was examined as a cathode for magnesium batteries. Poeppelmeier's research on oxide catalysis began during his time at Exxon and continued at Northwestern. From 2012 to 2020, he also directed Northwestern's Center for Catalysis and Surface Science.

=== Chirality and polarized light ===
In 2016 Poeppelmeier, Romain Gautier of the CNRS and colleagues reported in Nature Materials that a solid made from equal amounts of two mirror-image forms can be optically active when the molecules pack in certain crystal classes. According to Northwestern's account, the team designed the material in one of the four arrangements expected to allow circular dichroism, and Richard Van Duyne's group measured its response. A 2023 paper by his group used the symmetry groupings of the 1998 review to analyze how racemic crystals lose inversion symmetry.

In 2025 a Northwestern–University of Wisconsin–Madison team reported in Science that the centrosymmetric crystal Li_{2}Co_{3}(SeO_{3})_{4} absorbs left- and right-circularly polarized light to different extents. The theory was led by Roel Tempelaar, the work was co-led by Poeppelmeier and Randall Goldsmith, and Poeppelmeier's group synthesized the crystals. The authors traced the effect to interference between linear dichroism and linear birefringence, and the signal reversed when the sample was flipped. Reports in Chemical & Engineering News and Chemistry World presented the result as running against the long-standing expectation that centrosymmetric crystals cannot show such chiroptical behavior.

== Editorial work and honors ==
Poeppelmeier sat on the editorial board of Chemistry of Materials from 1990 to 1995 and served as an associate editor of Inorganic Chemistry for two decades, from 1993 to 2013; Northwestern lists a 2013 recognition for twenty years of service to that journal. He has served on the editorial boards of several journals, including Journal of Alloys and Compounds and Solid State Sciences, and more recently Science China Materials, whose board he joined in 2014. He and Jan Reedijk were the editors of the nine-volume second edition of Comprehensive Inorganic Chemistry (2013), which was planned as a successor to the 1973 original, and of the ten-volume third edition (2023).

He was elected a fellow of the American Association for the Advancement of Science in 1993. Northwestern's list of his honors also includes a fellowship of the Japan Society for the Promotion of Science in 1997 and a professorship of the Institut Universitaire de France in 2003. He received two National Science Foundation Creativity Extension Awards, in 2000 and 2022.

The Royal Academy of Exact, Physical and Natural Sciences named him a foreign corresponding member on June 22, 2016. In February 2017 the governing board of the Spanish Royal Society of Chemistry made him an honorary member. He received the appointment in May 2017 at the Faculty of Chemistry of the Complutense University of Madrid, during a scientific session held in his honor by the society's solid-state chemistry group. He had been a visiting professor at the Complutense in 2009.

Northwestern lists several Chinese lectureships, beginning with one from the National Natural Science Foundation of China in 1999, and a visiting professorship at the Chinese Academy of Sciences in 2011. In May 2021 the Xinjiang Daily reported that he was one of five recipients of the 2020 Tianshan Award, the highest honor the Xinjiang Uygur Autonomous Region gives to foreign experts; the newspaper named him as an expert engaged by the academy's Xinjiang Technical Institute of Physics and Chemistry.

In 2023 Poeppelmeier received the Fray International Sustainability Award from FLOGEN Stars Outreach at the Sustainable Industrial Processing Summit in Panama, for his work in solid-state materials chemistry.

== Selected publications ==
- Anderson, Mark T.; Greenwood, Kevin B.; Taylor, Gregg A.; Poeppelmeier, Kenneth R. (1993). "B-cation arrangements in double perovskites". Progress in Solid State Chemistry. 22 (3): 197–233. doi:10.1016/0079-6786(93)90004-B.
- Halasyamani, P. Shiv; Poeppelmeier, Kenneth R. (1998). "Noncentrosymmetric Oxides". Chemistry of Materials. 10 (10): 2753–2769. doi:10.1021/cm980140w.
- Gautier, Romain; Klingsporn, Jordan M.; Van Duyne, Richard P.; Poeppelmeier, Kenneth R. (2016). "Optical activity from racemates". Nature Materials. 15 (6): 591–592. doi:10.1038/nmat4628.
- Kageyama, Hiroshi; et al. (2018). "Expanding frontiers in materials chemistry and physics with multiple anions". Nature Communications. 9 772. doi:10.1038/s41467-018-02838-4. PMC 5823932. PMID 29472526.
- Parrish, Katherine A.; et al. (2025). "Differential absorption of circularly polarized light by a centrosymmetric crystal". Science. 388 (6752): 1194–1197. doi:10.1126/science.adr5478.
