= John Corbett (chemist) =

American solid-state chemist (1926–2013)

John D. Corbett
- Born: John Dudley Corbett; March 23, 1926; Yakima, Washington
- Died: September 2, 2013 (aged 87)
- Education: University of Wisconsin–Madison; University of Washington
- Scientific career
- Workplaces: Iowa State University; Ames Laboratory
- Academic advisors: Norman Wayne Gregory
- Doctoral students: Arnold Guloy, Kenneth Poeppelmeier

John Dudley Corbett (March 23, 1926 – September 2, 2013) was an American chemist who specialized in inorganic solid-state chemistry. At Iowa State and Ames Lab, Corbett lead a research group that focused on the synthesis and characterization of two broad classes of materials, notably Zintl phases and condensed transition metal halide clusters. Both classes of materials are important for their uses, for instance thermoelectrics, and for the theoretical advances they made possible by working to understand their complex bonding and electronic properties.

== Career ==
After graduating from Yakima High School, serving in the United States Navy until the end of World War II, and attending the North Dakota Teachers College, the University of Wisconsin–Madison, and the University of Washington, Corbett remained at Washington to complete his Ph.D. in 1952. He joined the chemistry faculty of Iowa State University and the scientific staff of Ames Laboratory in 1953. He was affiliated with both institutions for his entire career, and served as chair of the Department of Chemistry between 1968 and 1973. He was elected a Fellow of the American Association for the Advancement of Science. He was awarded two DOE Awards for Outstanding Scientific Accomplishments and Sustained Research in Materials Chemistry, the Humboldt Prize (1985), the 2005 Spedding Award from the Rare Earth Research Conference, the 2008 Monie A. Ferst Award from Sigma Xi, and several ACS Awards for both Inorganic Chemistry and Distinguished Service in the Advancement of Inorganic Chemistry. He was elected to the United States National Academy of Sciences in 1992.

== Personal life ==
Corbett was born to parents Alexander and Elizabeth Corbett in Yakima, Washington, on March 23, 1926, and had two brothers. He was married to F. Irene Lienkaemper from 1948 until her death in 1996. The couple raised three children. Corbett died on September 2, 2013, at the age of 87, following a stroke. The John D. Corbett Professorship was established in 2007, within Iowa State University's Department of Chemistry.
