= Powdered milk =

Dehydrated milk product

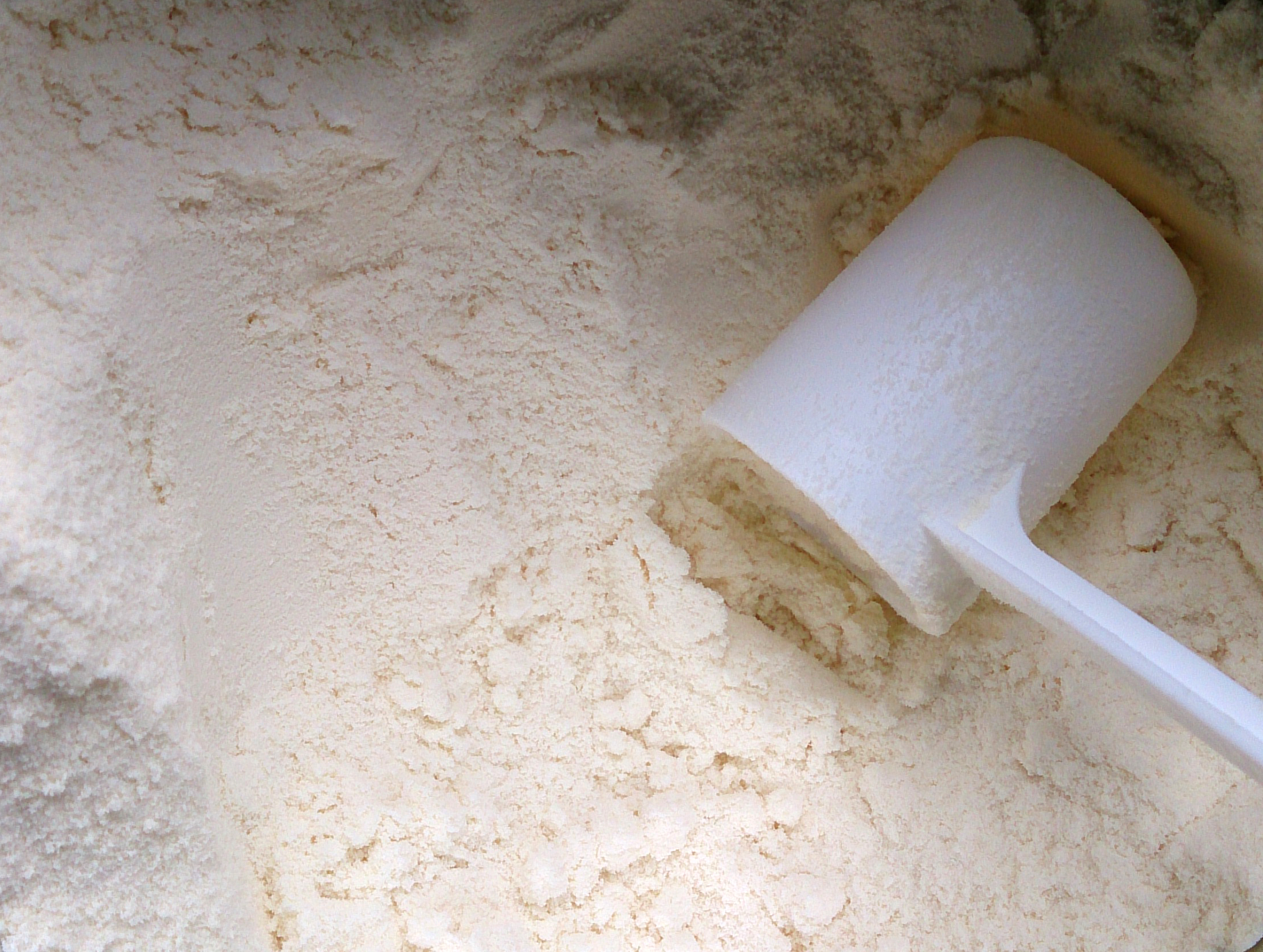
Powdered milk

Powdered milk, also called milk powder, dried milk, dry milk, or (in food ingredient labeling) milk solids, is a manufactured dairy product made by evaporating milk to a state of dryness. One purpose of drying milk is to preserve it; milk powder has a far longer shelf life than liquid milk and does not need to be refrigerated, due to its low moisture content. Another purpose is to reduce its bulk for the economy of transportation. Powdered milk and dairy products include such items as dry whole milk, nonfat (skimmed) dry milk, dry buttermilk, dry whey products and dry dairy blends. Many exported dairy products conform to standards laid out in Codex Alimentarius.

Powdered milk is used for food as an additive, for health (nutrition), and also in biotechnology (saturating).

== History and manufacture ==
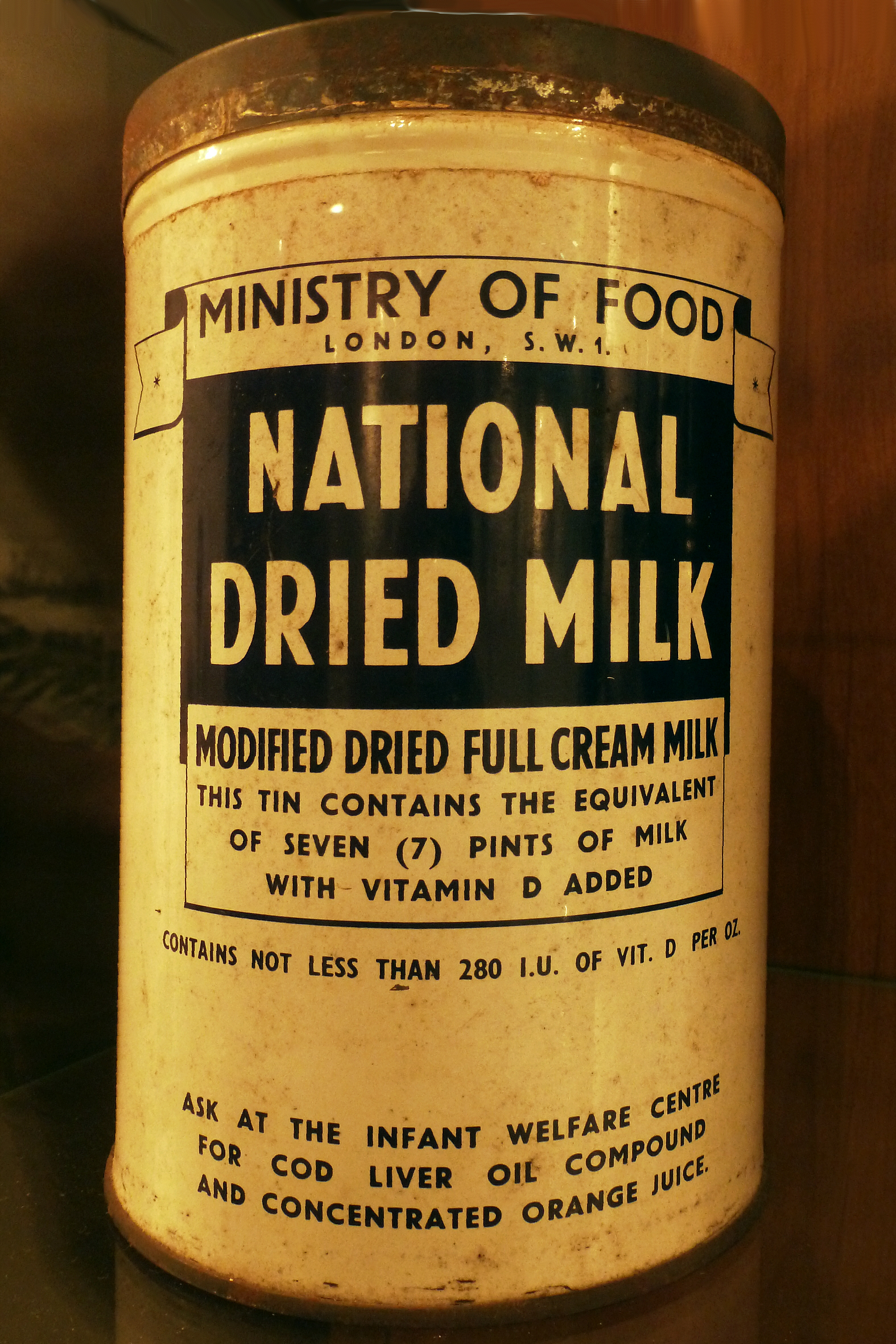
Modified dry whole milk, fortified with vitamin D. This is the original container from 1947, provided by the Ministry of Food in London, England.

While Marco Polo wrote of Mongolian Tatar troops in the time of Kublai Khan who carried sun-dried skimmed milk as "a kind of paste", the first modern production process for dried milk was invented by the Russian doctor Osip Krichevsky in 1802. The first commercial production of dried milk was organized by the Russian chemist M. Dirchoff in 1832. In 1855, T. S. Grimwade took a patent on a dried milk procedure, though William Newton had patented a vacuum drying process as early as 1837.

In modern times, powdered milk is usually made by spray drying nonfat skimmed milk, whole milk, buttermilk or whey. Pasteurized milk is first concentrated in an evaporator to approximately 50 percent milk solids. The resulting concentrated milk is then sprayed into a heated chamber where the water almost instantly evaporates, leaving fine particles of powdered milk solids.

Alternatively, the milk can be dried by drum drying. Milk is applied as a thin film to the surface of a heated drum, and the dried milk solids are then scraped off. However, powdered milk made this way tends to have a cooked flavour, due to caramelization caused by greater heat exposure.

Another process is freeze drying, which preserves many nutrients in milk, compared to drum drying.

The drying method and the heat treatment of the milk as it is processed alters the properties of the milk powder, such as its solubility in cold water, its flavour, and its bulk density.

== Food and health uses ==
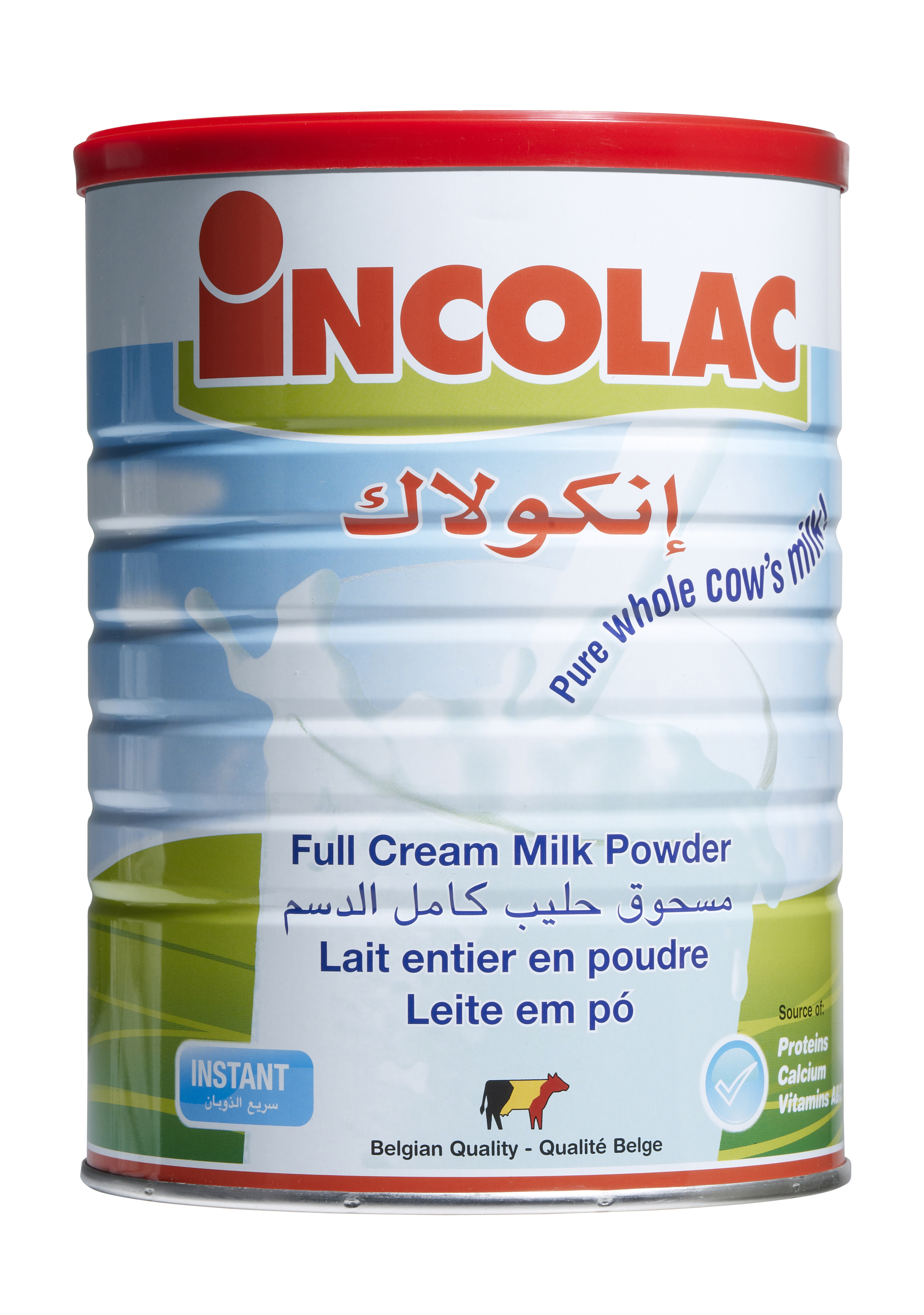
Incolac powdered milk

Powdered milk is a common item in UN food aid supplies, fallout shelters, warehouses, and wherever fresh milk is not a viable option. It is frequently used in the manufacture of infant formula. Like other dry foods, it is considered nonperishable and is favored by survivalists, hikers, and others requiring nonperishable, easy-to-prepare food. It is widely used in many developing countries because of reduced transport and storage costs (reduced bulk and weight, no refrigerated vehicles).

Because of its resemblance to cocaine and other drugs, powdered milk is sometimes used in filmmaking as a non-toxic prop that may be insufflated.

=== Baking ===
Powdered milk is often used in confectionery such as chocolate and caramel candy and in recipes for baked goods where adding liquid milk would render the product too thin. Powdered milk is also widely used in various sweets such as the Indian milk balls known as gulab jamun and the popular Indian sweet known as chum chum (made with skim milk powder, sprinkled with desiccated coconut). Many no-cook recipes that use nut butters use powdered milk to prevent the nut butter from turning liquid by absorbing the oil.

Due to the Maillard reaction, cooking powdered milk can lend it a caramelized, toasty flavor which is desirable in baked goods. Bon Appétit editor Shilpa Uskokovic also notes that the extra sugars and fats present in powdered milk can add additional caramelization to brown butter, render ice cream creamier and yogurt thicker, and "[improve] the structure and texture of yeast breads, making them loftier and more tender."

=== Reconstitution ===
The weight of nonfat dry milk (NFDM) to use is about 10% of the water weight. (Note: Gisslen wrote, "910 g water + 90 g nonfat dry milk" ⟹ 90 ~~g~~/910 ~~g~~ ≈ 0.0989 = 9.89%. Gisslen also wrote, "14.5 oz water + 1.5 oz nonfat dry milk" ⟹ 1.5 ~~oz~~/14.5 ~~oz~~ ≈ 0.1034 = 10.34%. There's a value range, depending on weight system used, of 9.89-10.34% NFDM based on water weight when reconstituting nonfat or skim milk.) Alternatively, when measuring by volume rather than weight, one cup of fluid milk from powdered milk requires one cup of water and one-third cup of powdered milk.

=== Nutritional value ===
Milk powders contain all 21 standard amino acids, the building blocks of proteins, and are high in soluble vitamins and minerals. According to USAID, the typical average amounts of major nutrients in the unreconstituted nonfat dry milk are (by weight) 36% protein, 52% carbohydrates (predominantly lactose), calcium 1.3%, potassium 1.8%. Whole milk powder, on the other hand, contains on average 25–27% protein, 36–38% carbohydrates, 26–40% fat, and 5–7% ash (minerals). In Canada, powdered milk must contain added vitamin D in an amount such that a reasonable daily intake of the milk will provide between 300 and 400 International units (IU) of vitamin D. However, inappropriate storage conditions, such as high relative humidity and high ambient temperature, can significantly degrade the nutritive value of milk powder.

Commercial milk powders are reported to contain oxysterols (oxidized cholesterol) in higher amounts than in fresh milk (up to 30 μg/g, versus trace amounts in fresh milk). Oxysterols are derivatives of cholesterol that are produced either by free radicals or by enzymes. Some free radicals-derived oxysterols have been suspected of being initiators of atherosclerotic plaques. For comparison, powdered eggs contain even more oxysterols, up to 200 μg/g.

=== Export market ===
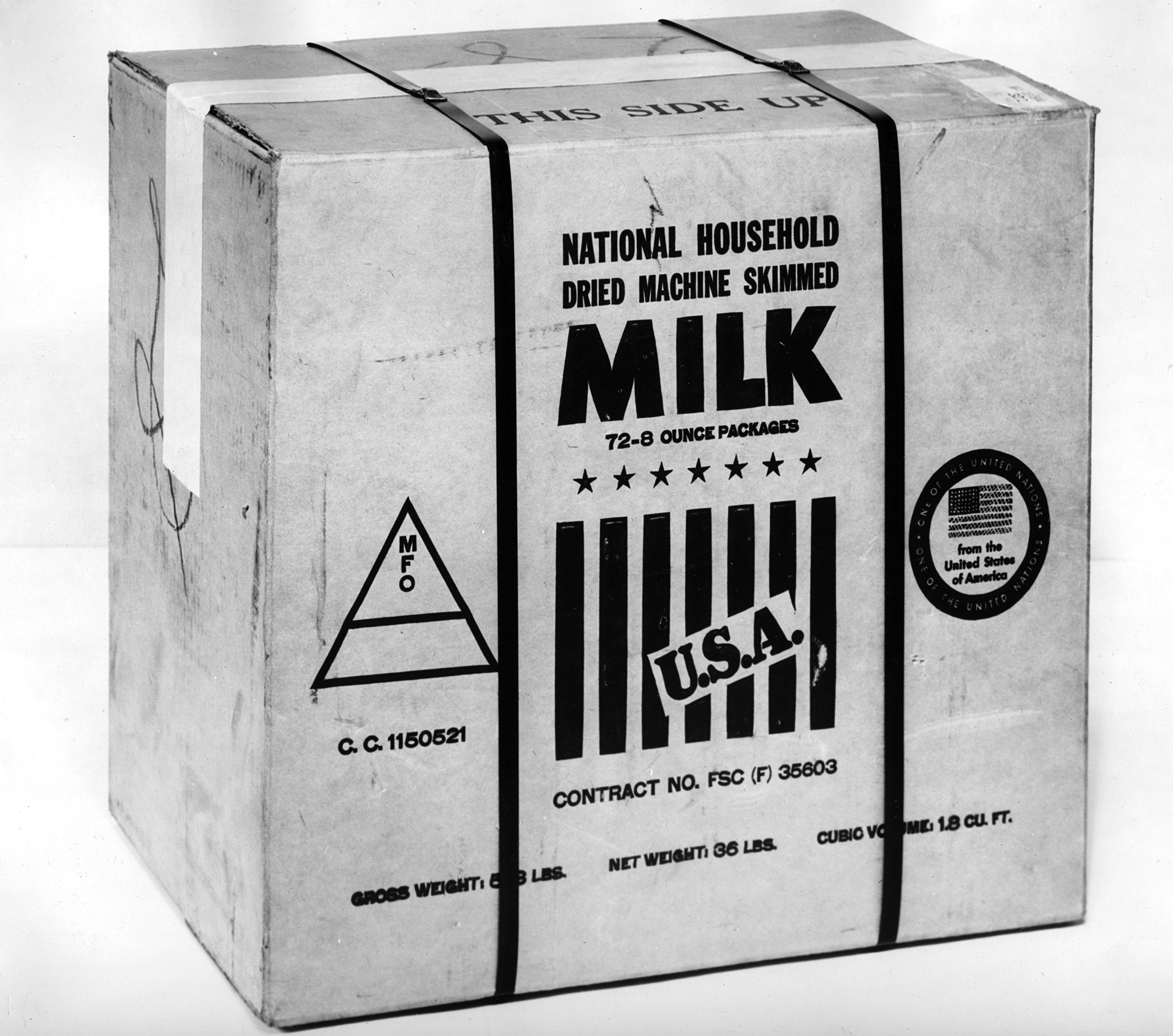
National household dried machine skimmed milk. This was U.S.-produced dry milk for food export in June 1944.

As of 2021, the largest producers of milk powder are New Zealand, China, Argentina and Brazil.

European production of milk powder in fiscal year 2019–2020 was estimated at around 3.0 million tonnes of which the main volume was exported in bulk packing or consumer packs.

Australia also has a significant milk powder export industry, exporting over 13,000 tonnes of skim and whole milk powder in fiscal year 2020–2021, to a value of approximately AUD $83 000 000.

Brands on the market include Nido, from the company Nestlé, Incolac from the company Milcobel, Dutch Lady from FrieslandCampina and Puck from Arla Foods.

Some of the largest businesses in the industry are Nestlé, Danone, Lactalis, Fonterra, FrieslandCampina, Dean Foods, Arla Foods, Dairy Farmers of America, Kraft Foods, Saputo, and Parmalat.

=== Adulteration ===
In the 2008 Chinese milk scandal, adulteration with melamine was found in Sanlu-brand infant formula, added to fool tests into reporting higher protein content. Thousands became ill, and some children died, after consuming the product.

=== Contamination scare ===
In August 2013, China temporarily suspended all milk powder imports from New Zealand, after a scare where botulism-causing bacteria were falsely detected in several batches of New Zealand-produced whey protein concentrate. As a result of the product recall, the New Zealand dollar slipped by 0.8% (to 77.78 US cents) based on expected losses in sales from this single commodity.

== Use in biotechnology ==
Fat-free powdered milk is used as a saturating agent to block nonspecific binding sites on supports like blotting membranes (nitrocellulose, polyvinylidene fluoride (PVDF) or nylon), preventing binding of further detection reagents and subsequent background. It may be referred as Blotto. The major protein of milk, casein, is responsible for most of the binding site saturation effect.

== See also ==
- Baked milk
- Coconut milk powder
- Condensed milk
- Convenience food
- Creamer
- Evaporated milk
- Fat content of milk
- Food powder
- Instant breakfast
- List of dried foods
- Malted milk
- Pomazánkové máslo
- Powdered eggs
- Raw milk
- Scalded milk
