= Sour cream =

Fermented dairy product

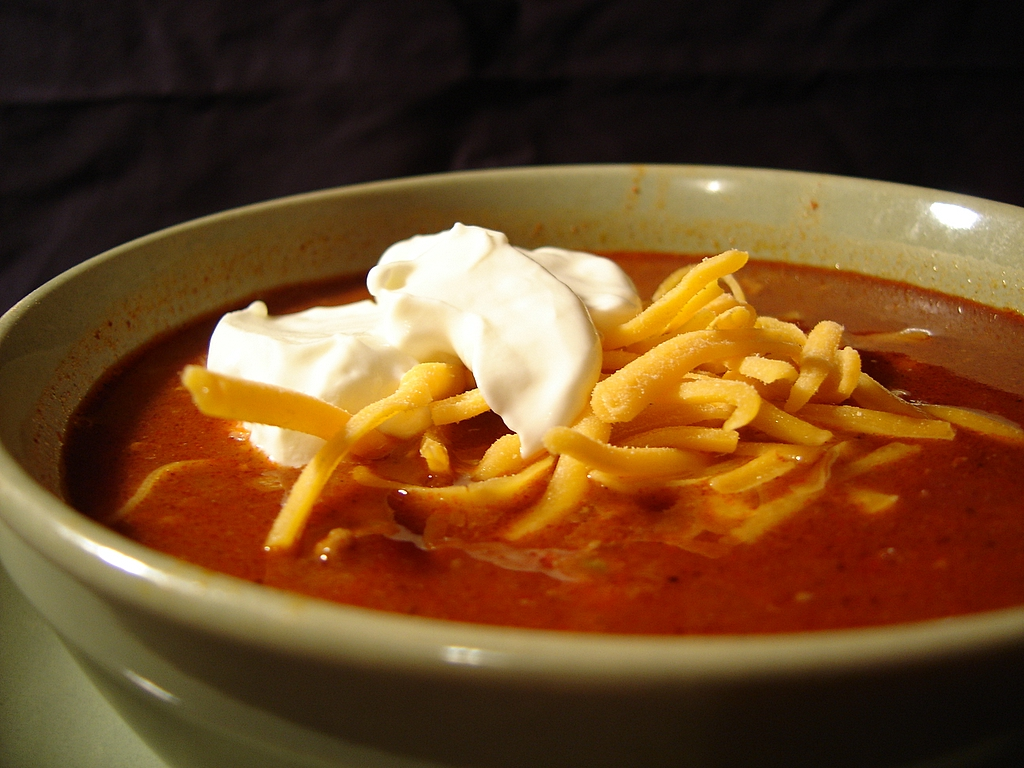
Bowl of chili with sour cream and cheese

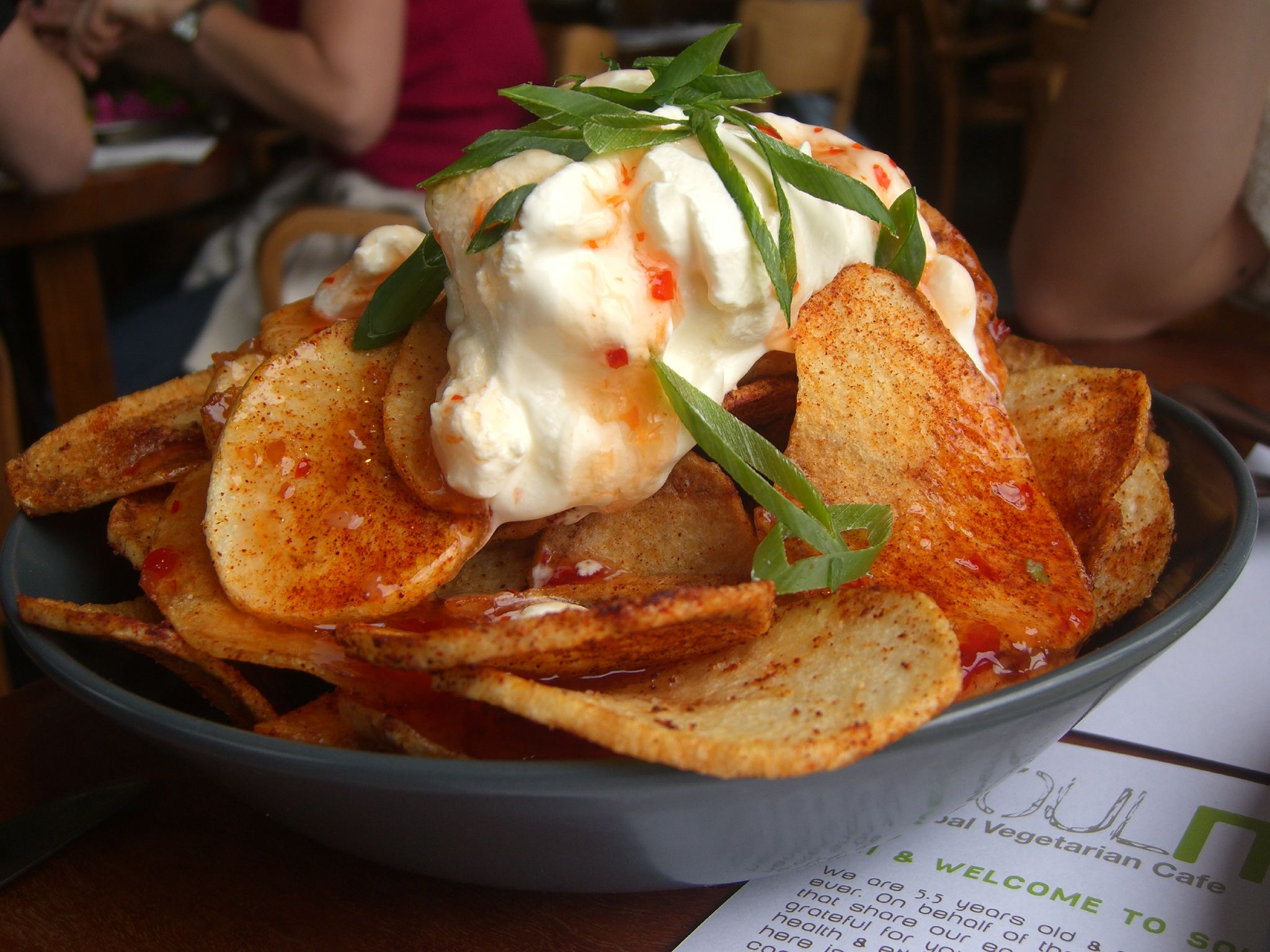
Crisp potato skins with sour cream and chili sauce

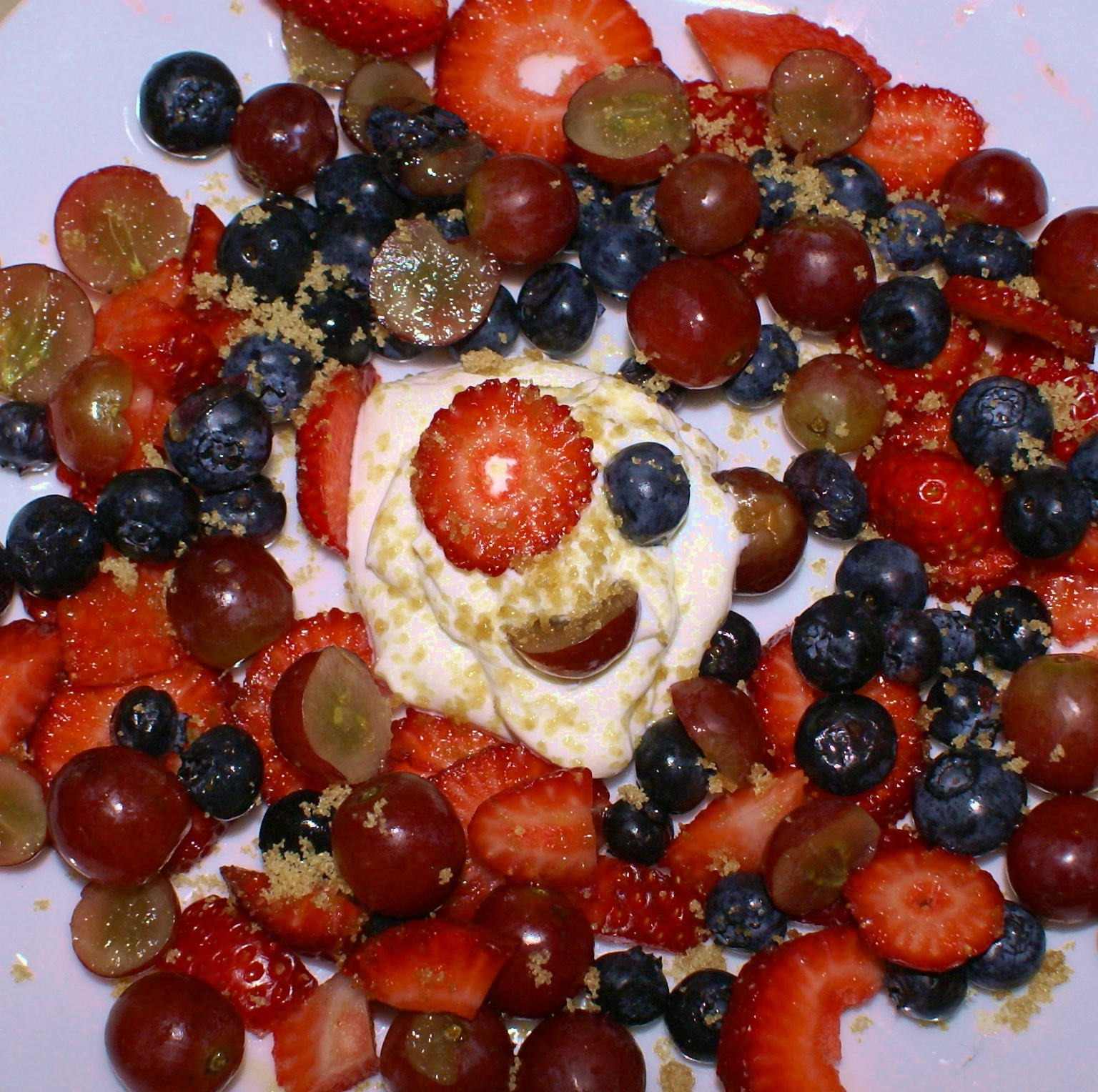
Mixed berries with sour cream and brown sugar

Sour cream (sometimes known as soured cream in British English) is a dairy product obtained by fermenting regular cream with certain kinds of lactic acid bacteria. The bacterial culture, which is introduced either deliberately or naturally, sours and thickens the cream. Its name comes from the production of lactic acid by bacterial fermentation, which is called souring.

== Traditional ==
Traditionally, sour cream was made by letting cream that was skimmed off the top of milk ferment at a moderate temperature. It can also be prepared by the souring of pasteurized cream with acid-producing bacterial culture. The bacteria that developed during fermentation thickened the cream and made it more acidic, a natural way of preserving it.

== Commercial varieties ==
According to US (FDA) regulations, commercially produced sour cream contains no less than 18% milk fat before bulking agents are added, and no less than 14.4% milk fat in the finished product. Additionally, it must have a total acidity of no less than 0.5%. It may also contain milk and whey solids, buttermilk, starch in an amount not exceeding one percent, salt, and rennet derived from aqueous extracts from the fourth stomach of calves, kids or lambs, in an amount consistent with good manufacturing practice. In addition, according to the Canadian food regulations, the emulsifying, gelling, stabilizing and thickening agents in sour cream are algin, carob bean gum (locust bean gum), carrageenan, gelatin, guar gum, pectin, or propylene glycol alginate or any combination thereof in an amount not exceeding 0.5 percent, monoglycerides, mono- and diglycerides, or any combination thereof, in an amount not exceeding 0.3 percent, and sodium phosphate dibasic in an amount not exceeding 0.05 percent.

Sour cream is not fully fermented, and like many dairy products, it must be refrigerated both before and after opening the sealed container. Additionally, in Canadian regulations, a milk-coagulating enzyme derived from Rhizomucor miehei (Cooney and Emerson) from Mucor pusillus Lindt by pure culture fermentation process or from Aspergillus oryzae RET-1 (pBoel777) can also be added to the sour cream production process in an amount consistent with good manufacturing practice. Sour cream is sold with an expiration date stamped on the container, though whether this is a "sell by", a "best by" or "use by" date varies with local regulation. Refrigerated, unopened sour cream can last for 1–2 weeks beyond its sell by date. Once it has been opened, refrigerated sour cream generally lasts for 7–10 days.

== Physicochemical properties ==
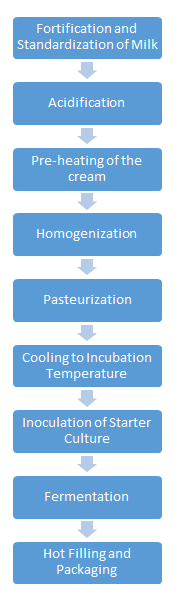
Simple illustration of the processing order of sour cream manufacturing

=== Ingredients ===
Processed sour cream can include any of the following additives and preservatives: grade A whey, modified food starch, sodium phosphate, sodium citrate, guar gum, carrageenan, calcium sulfate, potassium sorbate, and locust bean gum.

=== Processing ===
The manufacturing of sour cream begins with the standardization of fat content; this step is to ensure that the desired or legal amount of milk fat is present. As previously mentioned the minimum amount of milk fat that must be present in sour cream is 18%. During this step in the manufacturing process, other dry ingredients are added to the cream, such as additional whey. Another additive used during this processing step is a series of ingredients known as stabilizers. The common stabilizers that are added to sour cream are polysaccharides and gelatin, including modified food starch, guar gum, and carrageenans. Stabilizers provide a smoother texture, create specific gel structures, and reduce whey syneresis. This extends the product's shelf life. Synresis can occur during the transportation, when sour cream containers are jostled and agitated. The next step in the manufacturing process is acidification. Organic acids, such as citric acid or sodium citrate, are added to the cream prior to homogenization. This increases the metabolic activity of the starter culture. Manufacturers heat the mixture for a short period of time to prepare it for homogenization.

Homogenization improves the quality of the sour cream in regards to color, consistency, creaming stability, and creaminess. During homogenization, larger fat globules within the cream are broken down into smaller sized globules to allow an even suspension within the system. At this point in the processing, the milk fat globules and the casein proteins do not interact with each other. The formation of the small globules (below 2 microns in size) increases the product's viscosity. There is also a reduction in the separation of whey, enhancing the white color of the sour cream.

After homogenization of the cream, the mixture must undergo pasteurization. Pasteurization is a mild heat treatment of the cream, with the purpose of killing any harmful bacteria in the cream. The homogenized cream undergoes high temperature short time (HTST) pasteurization method. In this type of pasteurization the cream is heated to the high temperature of 85 °C for thirty minutes. This processing step creates a sterile medium in which the starter bacteria can thrive.

After pasteurization, the mixture is cooled down to a temperature of 20˚C, an ideal temperature for mesophilic inoculation. It is then inoculated with 1–2% active starter culture. The starter culture initiates the fermentation process by enabling the homogenized cream to reach a pH of 4.5 to 4.8. Lactic acid bacteria (LAB) ferment lactose to lactic acid. Different LABs affect texture, aroma, and flavors, such as diacetyl.

After inoculation the cream is portioned in packages and fermented for 18 hours, lowering the pH from about 6.5 to 4.6. After fermentation, one more cooling process takes place. After this cooling process, the sour cream is packaged into final containers and sent to market.

=== Physical-chemical changes ===
During the pasteurization process, the temperature is raised past the point where all the particles in the system are stable. When cream is heated to temperatures above 70 °C, there is denaturation of whey proteins. To avoid phase separation brought on by the increased surface area, the fat globules readily bind with the denatured β-lactoglobulin. The adsorption of the denatured whey proteins (and whey proteins that bound with casein micelles) increases the number of structural components in the product; the texture of sour cream can be partly attributed to this. The denaturation of whey proteins is also known for increasing the strength of the cross-linking within the cream system, due to the formation of whey protein polymers.

When the cream is inoculated with starter bacteria and the bacteria begin converting lactose to lactic acid, the pH begins a slow decrease. When this decrease begins, dissolution of calcium phosphate occurs, and causes a rapid drop in the pH. During fermentation the pH drops from around 6.5 to 4.6, this drop in pH brings on a physicochemical change to the casein micelles. Recall the casein proteins are heat stable, but they are not stable in certain acidic conditions. The colloidal particles are stable at the normal pH of milk which is 6.5-6.7, the micelles will precipitate at the isoelectric point (pI) of milk which is a pH of 4.6. At a pH of 6.5 the casein micelles repulse each other due to the electronegativity of the outer layer of the micelle. During this drop in pH there is a reduction in zeta potential, from the highly net negative charges in cream to no net charge when approaching the pI. $U_E= \left \lfloor \frac{2\varepsilon zf(ka)}{3\eta} \right \rfloor$ The formula shown is the Henry's equation, where z: zeta potential, Ue: electrophoretic mobility, ε: dielectric constant, η: viscosity, and f(ka): Henry's function. This equation is used to find the zeta potential, which is calculated to find the electrokinetic potential in colloidal dispersions. Through electrostatic interactions, the casein molecules begin approaching and aggregating together. The casein proteins enter a more ordered system, attributing to a strong gel structure formation. The whey proteins that were denatured in the heating steps of processing, are insoluble at this acidic pH and are precipitated with casein.

The interactions involved in gelation and aggregation of casein micelles are hydrogen bonds, hydrophobic interactions, electrostatic attractions and van der Waals attractions These interactions are highly dependent on pH, temperature and time. At the isoelectric point, the net surface charge of casein micelle is zero and a minimum of electrostatic repulsion can be expected. Furthermore, aggregation is taking place due to dominating hydrophobic interactions. Differences in the zeta potential of milk can be caused by differences in ionic strength differences, which in turn depend on the amount of calcium present in the milk. The stability of milk is largely due to the electrostatic repulsion of casein micelles. These casein micelles aggregated and precipitated when they approach the absolute zeta potential values at pH 4.0 – 4.5. When the heat treated and denatured, whey protein is covering the casein micelle, isoelectric point of the micelle elevated to the isoelectric point of β lactoglobulin (approximately pH 5.3).

=== Rheological properties ===
Sour cream exhibits time-dependent thixotropic behaviors. Thixotropic fluids reduce in viscosity as work is applied, and when the product is no longer under stress, the fluid returns to its previous viscosity. The viscosity of sour cream at room temperature is 100,000 cP, (for comparison: water has a viscosity of 1 cP at 20 °C).

== Uses ==
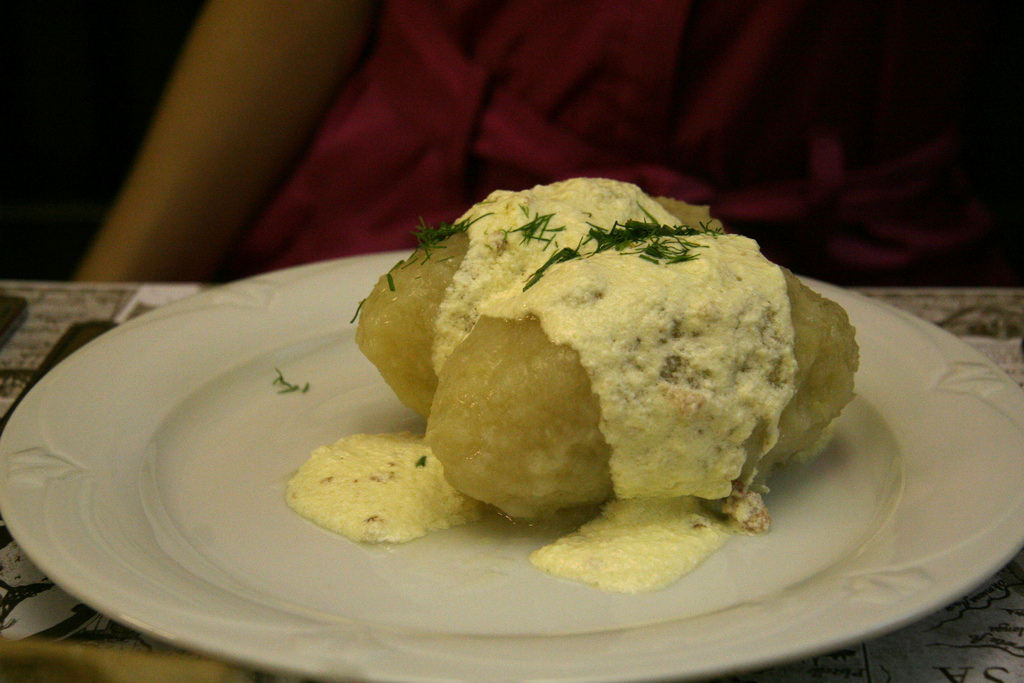
Lithuanian cepelinai topped with sour cream

Sour cream is commonly used as a condiment on foods, or combined with other ingredients to form a dipping sauce. It can be added to soups and sauces to help thicken and make them creamy, or in baking to help increase the moisture level beyond what milk can provide.

Sour cream is a common ingredient and accompaniment in Eastern European cuisines and among Eastern European diaspora communities, including in Ashkenazi Jewish culinary traditions and some Israeli food culture influenced by Eastern European immigration.

In Tex–Mex cuisine, it is often used as a topping for nachos, tacos, burritos, and taquitos.

== See also ==
- Cream cheese
- Fermented milk products
- List of dairy products
- List of dips
- Smetana
- Pomazánkové máslo
- Yogurt
- Tex-Mex
