= Dysprosium stannides =

Under standard conditions, the elements dysprosium and tin combine to form a number of intermetallic compounds, the dysprosium stannides. Dysprosium stannides with simple empirical formulas include Dy_{5}Sn_{3} and DySn_{2}, but four other intermetallics have intermediate composition. None is believed to survive temperatures higher than 1,866 °C (3,391 °F), whereat Dy_{5}Sn_{3} decomposes. Although dysprosium is a lanthanoid, its f orbitals likely participate in the metallic bonding: mixing dysprosium and tin releases an enthalpy quite different from mixing samarium and tin, with gadolinium and tin intermediate.

DySn_{2} adopts the zirconium disilicide crystal structure, and undergoes a Néel transition around 17 K (−429.1 °F). The magnetic patterning below the Néel point has periods incommensurable with the atomic unit cell, leading to a sinusoidal modulation. Theoretically, DySn_{2} should transition at very low temperatures to a different magnetic pattern with commensurable spatial period, but even at 1.5 K (−456.97 °F) the incommensurable pattern survives.
