= Nido (brand) =

Nestlé milk brand

- Product type: Milk substitute powder
- Current owner: Nestlé
- Country: Switzerland
- Introduced: 1944; 82 years ago
- Related brands: Dancow (Indonesia); Nespray (various regions); Ninho (Brazil)
- Markets: Worldwide
- Ambassadors: Carmina Villarroel (2005–2006); Ruffa Gutierrez (2006–2008); Sharon Cuneta; Kristine Hermosa; Sarah Lahbati; Marian Rivera (2019–present); Iya Villania
- Website: nestle.com/nido

Nido is a milk substitute powder and milk powder brand manufactured by Nestlé. It was introduced in the 1960s in Switzerland. The range claims to offer "nutrition solutions for each stage of childhood".

== Overview ==
The different varieties include instant dried whole milk with Vitamins A & D, and Nido Kinder 1+. Nido is fortified with additional nutrients to those found in milk. Nido Kinder 1+ is non-fat powdered milk that is fortified with Prebio 1, a prebiotic fibre that benefits a child’s digestive system.

Nestlé says that Nido products are not suitable for children of under 1 year of age. Although there is no age recommendation apart from the minimum age restriction of 1 year, marketing is featured around children over three years of age with the tagline "Nutritious Milk for Growing Kids".

Nido Fortificada contains: whole milk, soy lecithin, vitamins A (as acetate), C, and D3, iron (as ferric pyrophosphate), and zinc sulfate.

Nido Kinder 1+ contains: nonfat milk, vegetable oils (corn, canola, palm), sugar, maltodextrin, lactose, milk fat, honey, prebiotics oligofructose and inulin, less than 2% calcium carbonate, soy lecithin, vitamins B6, C, D3, and K, vitamins A and E as acetate, taurine, ferrous sulfate, zinc sulfate, niacinamide, thiamine mononitrate, folic acid, biotin, calcium pantothenate, and sodium selenate.

Nido Dry Whole Milk (product of Netherlands) contains: whole milk, soy lecithin.

== Availability ==
Nido is available in Mexico, Asia (except Indonesia, where this milk is named "Dancow"), Middle East, most of Africa, most of South America (in Brazil it is named "Ninho"), the UK, Portugal and some parts of the United States, where it is mainly sold in Walmart Supercenters. In some regions, the product is sold under the name "Nespray".

In Spain, however, the name Nido refers to a bird food sold by Nestlé Purina PetCare.

== Sugar Content in Low & Medium income countries ==
A report by Public Eye, a Swiss-based sustainability NGO, found that for Nestlé-brand breast milk substitutes such as Cerelac and Nido, a higher quantity of added sugar was found in low and medium-income countries. Countries such as Indonesia were found to have added sugar contents of up to 6 grams per portion, while Switzerland itself had no added sugar for the same given wheat-based product.

== See also ==
- Nestlé Bear Brand
