= Plumbide =

Compound containing a plumbide anion

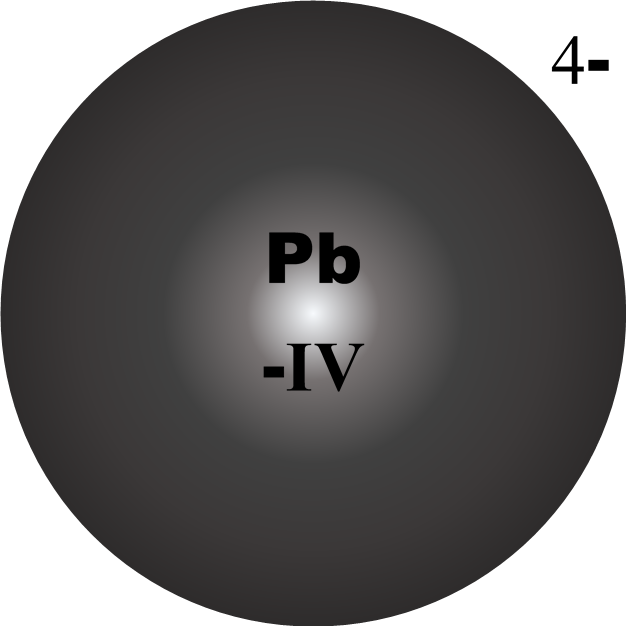
Plumbide

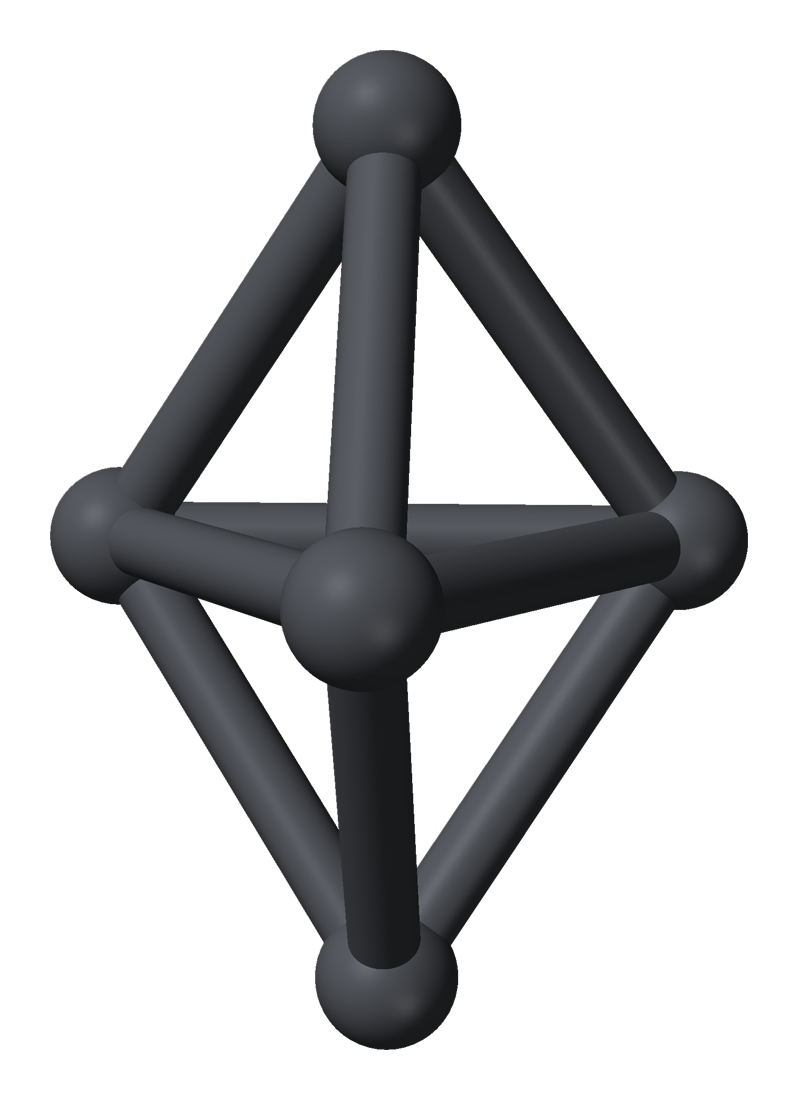
[Pb_{5}]^{2−}

Plumbide is an anion of lead atoms. There are three plumbide anions, written as Pb^{−}, Pb^{2−} and Pb^{4−} with 3 oxidation states, −1, −2 and −4, respectively. A plumbide can refer to one of two things: an intermetallic compound that contains lead, or a Zintl phase compound with lead as the anion.

== Zintl phase ==
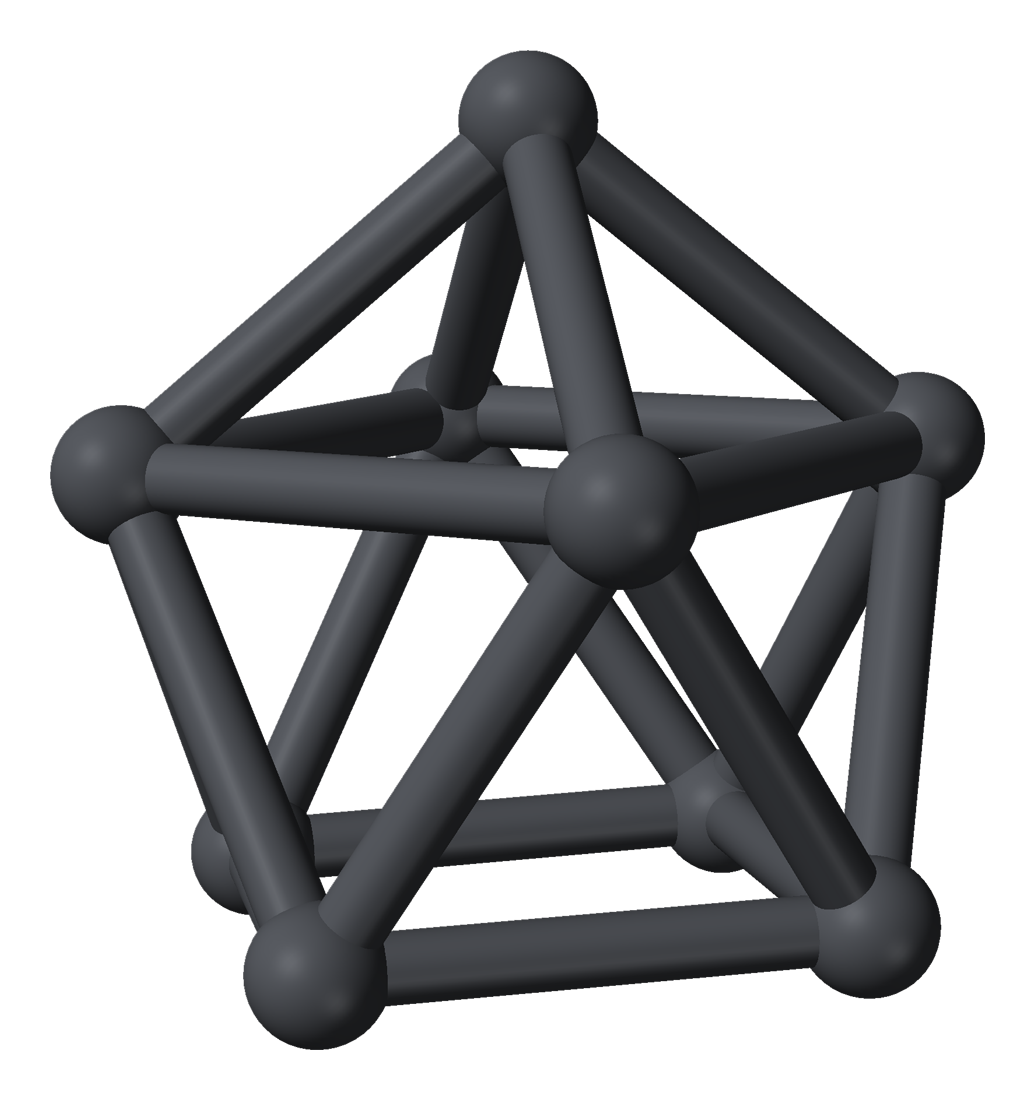
[Pb_{9}]^{4−} from [K(18-crown-6)]_{2}K_{2}Pb_{9}·(en)_{1.5}

Plumbides can be formed when lead forms a Zintl phase compound with a more metallic element. One salt that can be formed this way is when cryptand reacts with sodium and lead in ethylenediamine (en) to produce [Na(crypt)]^{+}_{2}[Pb_{5}]^{2−}, which is red in solution. Lead can also create anions with tin, in a series of anions with the formula [Sn_{9−x}Pb_{x}]^{4−}.

Lead can also form the [Pb_{9}]^{4−} anion, which is emerald green in solution.

== Examples ==
An example of a plumbide is CeRhPb. The lead atom has a coordination number of 12 in the crystal structure of this compound. It is bound to four rhodiums, six ceriums, and two other lead atoms in the crystal structure of the chemical.

Several other plumbides are the M_{2}Pd_{2}Pb plumbides, where M is a rare-earth element, and the intermetallic additionally contains a palladium. These plumbides tend to exhibit antiferromagnetism, and all of them are conductors.

A third plumbide is Ti_{6}Pb_{4.8}. Like the above plumbides, it is an intermetallic, but it only contains titanium as the other metal, and not any rare earths.

Plumbides can also be Zintl phase compounds, such as [K(18-crown-6)]_{2}K_{2}Pb_{9}·(en)_{1.5}. This is not a simple Zintl compound, but rather contains the organic molecules 18-crown-6 and ethylenediamine (en) in order to stabilize the crystal structure.
