= Zirconium disilicide =

Names
- Other names Zirconium disilicide

Identifiers
| CAS Number | 12039-90-6 |
| ChemSpider | 8617253 |
| ECHA InfoCard | 100.031.725 |
| EC Number | 234-911-1 |
| PubChem CID | 6336892 |
| CompTox Dashboard (EPA) | DTXSID301014259 |
- InChI: InChI=1S/2Si.Zr Key: GJIKIPCNQLUSQC-UHFFFAOYSA-N

Properties
| Chemical formula | ZrSi_{2} |
| Molar mass | 147.395 g/mol |
| Appearance | gray powder |
| Density | 4.88 g/cm^{3} |
| Melting point | 1,620 °C (2,950 °F; 1,890 K) |
| Solubility in water | insoluble |
| Solubility | soluble in hydrofluoric acid |

Structure
| Crystal structure | Orthorhombic |
| Lattice constant | a = 3.72 au, b = 14.69 au, c = 3.66 au |

Hazards
| Safety data sheet (SDS) | MSDS |
- Except where otherwise noted, data are given for materials in their standard state (at 25 °C [77 °F], 100 kPa). verify (what is ?) Infobox references

Zirconium disilicide is an inorganic chemical compound with the chemical formula ZrSi_{2}, consisting of zirconium and silicon atoms. It is a ceramic, but not very hard and very brittle.
