= Helimagnetism =

Magnetic materials with specific magnetic order

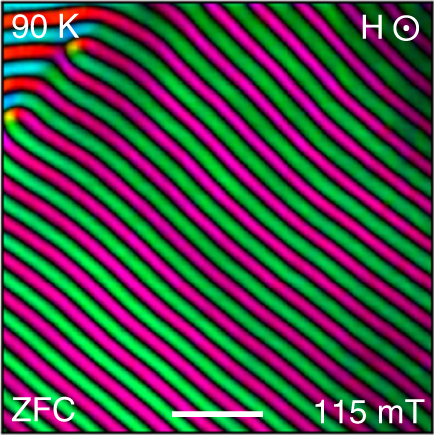
Lorentz TEM image of helical spin stripes in iron germanide (FeGe) at 90 K

Helimagnetism is a form of magnetic ordering where spins of neighbouring magnetic moments arrange themselves in a spiral or helical pattern, with a characteristic turn angle of somewhere between 0 and 180 degrees. It results from the competition between ferromagnetic and antiferromagnetic exchange interactions. It is possible to view ferromagnetism and antiferromagnetism as helimagnetic structures with characteristic turn angles of 0 and 180 degrees respectively. Helimagnetic order breaks spatial inversion symmetry, as it can be either left-handed or right-handed in nature.

Strictly speaking, helimagnets have no permanent magnetic moment, and as such are sometimes considered a complicated type of antiferromagnet. This distinguishes helimagnets from conical magnets, (e.g. Holmium below 20 K) which have spiral modulation in addition to a permanent magnetic moment. Helimagnets can be characterized by the distance it takes for the spiral to complete one turn. In analogy to the pitch of screw thread, the period of repetition is known as the "pitch" of the helimagnet. If the spiral's period is some rational multiple of the crystal's unit cell, the structure is commensurate, like the structure originally proposed for MnO_{2}. On the other hand, if the multiple is irrational, the magnetism is incommensurate, like the updated MnO_{2} structure.

Helimagnetism was first proposed in 1959, as an explanation of the magnetic structure of manganese dioxide. Initially applied to neutron diffraction, it has since been observed more directly by Lorentz electron microscopy. Some helimagnetic structures are reported to be stable up to room temperature. Like how ordinary ferromagnets have domain walls that separate individual magnetic domains, helimagnets have their own classes of domain walls which are characterized by topological charge.

Many helimagnets have a chiral cubic structure, such as the FeSi (B20) crystal structure type. In these materials, the combination of ferromagnetic exchange and the Dzyaloshinskii–Moriya interaction leads to helixes with relatively long periods. Since the crystal structure is noncentrosymetric even in the paramagnetic state, the magnetic transition to a helimagnetic state does not break inversion symmetry, and the direction of the spiral is locked to the crystal structure.

On the other hand, helimagnetism in other materials can also be based on frustrated magnetism or the RKKY interaction. The result is that centrosymmetric structures like the MnP-type (B31) compounds can also exhibit double-helix type helimagnetism where both left and right handed spirals coexist. For these itinerant helimagnets, the direction of the helicity can be controlled by applied electric currents and magnetic fields.

Helimagnetic materials
Material	Temperature range	Space group
β-MnO_{2}	< 93 K	P4_{2}/mnm
FeGe,	< 278 K	P2_{1}3
MnGe	< 170 K	P2_{1}3
MnSi,	< 29 K	P2_{1}3
Fe_{x}Co_{1−x}Si (0.3 ≤ x ≤ 0.85)		P2_{1}3
Cu_{2}OSeO_{3}	< 58 K	P2_{1}3
FeP	< 120 K	Pnma
FeAs	< 77 K	Pnma
MnP	< 50 K	Pnma
CrAs	< 261 K	Pnma
CrI_{2}	< 17 K	Cmc2_{1}
FeCl_{3}	< 9 K	R3̅
NiBr_{2}	< 22 K	R3̅m
NiI_{2}	< 60 K	R3̅m
Cr_{1/3}NbS_{2}	< 127 K	P6_{3}22
Tb	219–231 K	P6_{3}/mmc
Dy	85–179 K	P6_{3}/mmc
Ho	20–132 K	P6_{3}/mmc

== See also ==
- Antisymmetric exchange
- Magnetic skyrmion
- Ferromagnetic resonance
