= Chromium(IV) silicide =

Names
- IUPAC name Chromium(4+) silicide

Identifiers
CAS Number	12626-44-7
3D model (JSmol)	Interactive image
ChemSpider	103867619
ECHA InfoCard	100.031.471
EC Number	234-632-5
PubChem CID	72720431
- InChI: InChI=1S/Cr.Si Key: DYRBFMPPJATHRF-UHFFFAOYSA-N
- SMILES: [Si].[Cr]

Properties
Chemical formula	CrSi
Molar mass	80.081 g/mol
Density	5.44 g/cm^{3}
Solubility in water	insoluble
Magnetic susceptibility (χ)	5.1×10^{−6} emu/g

Structure
Crystal structure	Cubic, cP8
Space group	P2_{1}3, No. 198
Lattice constant	a = 0.4607 nm
Formula units (Z)	4

Related compounds
Other cations	Cobalt silicide Manganese silicide Iron silicide
- Except where otherwise noted, data are given for materials in their standard state (at 25 °C [77 °F], 100 kPa). Infobox references

Chromium(IV) silicide or chromium monosilicide is an inorganic compound of chromium and silicon with a chemical formula of CrSi. It is a metal with an electrical resistivity of ca. 2×10^{−4} Ω·cm.
