= Copper oxide selenite =

Identifiers
3D model (JSmol)	Interactive image
CompTox Dashboard (EPA)	DTXSID801336785
- InChI: InChI=1S/2Cu.H2O3Se.O/c;;1-4(2)3;/h;;(H2,1,2,3);/q2*+1;;-2/p-2 Key: CGYPTBPQZTWRHL-UHFFFAOYSA-L
- SMILES: [O-][Se](=O)[O-].[Cu+].[Cu+].[O-2]

Properties
Chemical formula	Cu_{2}OSeO_{3}
Molar mass	270.059 g/mol
Appearance	Green dodecahedral crystals
Density	5.1 g/cm^{3}
Band gap	2.5 eV
Thermal conductivity	400 W/(m·K) (9 K)
Refractive index (n_{D})	3.8 (100 K, 1 kHz)

Structure
Crystal structure	Cubic
Space group	P2_{1}3, #198, cP56
Lattice constant	a = 0.8924 nm
Formula units (Z)	8
- Except where otherwise noted, data are given for materials in their standard state (at 25 °C [77 °F], 100 kPa). Infobox references

Copper oxide selenite is an inorganic compound with the chemical formula Cu_{2}OSeO_{3}. It is an electrically insulating, piezoelectric and piezomagnetic material, which becomes a ferrimagnet upon cooling below 58 K. As of 2021, Cu_{2}OSeO_{3} is the only insulating material that hosts magnetic skyrmions.

== Properties ==
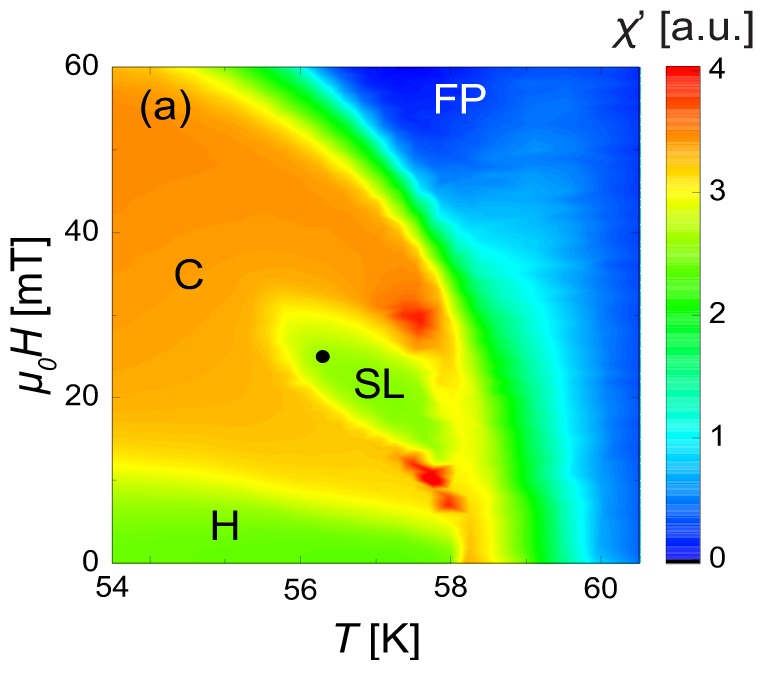
Magnetic phase diagram of Cu_{2}OSeO_{3} for H ∥ [111] crystal axis. H, C, FP and SL stand for helical, conical, field-polarized (ferrimagnetic or paramagnetic) and skyrmion lattice phases, respectively.

Cu_{2}OSeO_{3} is a ferrimagnet, and all its properties below the Curie temperature strongly depend on magnetic field. With increasing field, its spin texture changes from helical stripes to conical stripes or skyrmion lattice, and then to a "field polarized", i.e., ferrimagnetic alignment. Thermal conductivity peaks around 9 K with a value of ca. 400 W/(m·K). The magnetization damping constant is 1×10^{−4} at 5 K. This value is only 4 times larger than that of yttrium iron garnet, which has the lowest magnetization damping value among all materials. This property is advantageous for high-frequency electronic applications, as it results in low current-induced heat.

== Structure ==
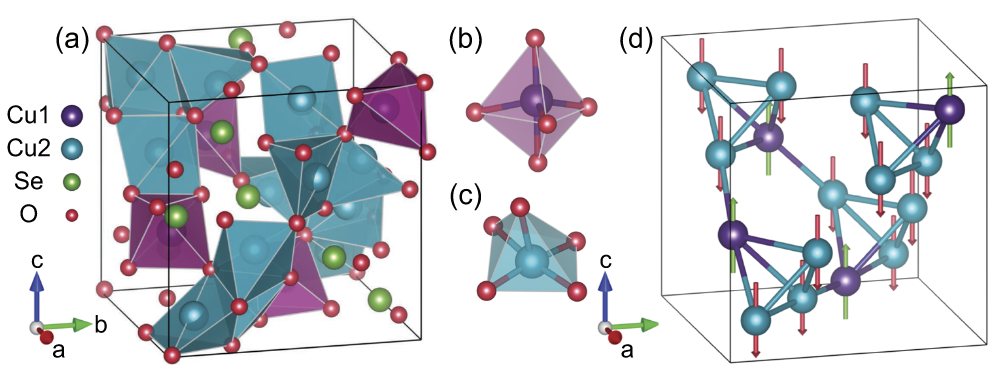
(a) Crystal structure of Cu_{2}OSeO_{3} consisting of (b) Cu1 bipyramids and (c) Cu2 distorted square-based pyramids. Bonds to Se ions are omitted for clarity. (d) The ferrimagnetic structure of Cu_{2}OSeO_{3} with spins (green arrows) on Cu1 site antiparallel to the spins (red arrows) on Cu2 sites.

Cu_{2}OSeO_{3} crystals have a cubic, distorted pyrochlore structure built by Cu_{4}O and SeO_{3} units. The spins on three Cu^{2+} ions in each tetrahedron (Cu1 sites) are aligned, while the Cu2 spin is facing in the opposite direction, resulting in a ferrimagnetic order. The helical spin and skyrmion textures emerge at low magnetic fields due to the Dzyaloshinskii-Moriya interaction.

== Synthesis ==
Cu_{2}OSeO_{3} polycrystals can be grown by heating a 2:1 molar mixture of CuO and SeO_{2} powders at 600 °C for 12 hours in vacuum. They can be converted into olive-green single crystals ca. 4 mm in size by chemical vapor transport. NH_{4}Cl is used as the transport agent; it sublimes at 340 °C, yielding NH_{3} and HCl gases.
