= FLEUR =

- Developer(s): The FLEUR team
- Stable release: MaX-R7.1 / March 20, 2024; 18 months ago
- Repository: iffgit.fz-juelich.de/fleur/fleur
- Written in: Fortran
- Operating system: Linux
- License: MIT License
- Website: www.flapw.de

The FLEUR code (also Fleur or fleur) is an open-source scientific software package for the simulation of material properties of crystalline solids, thin films, and surfaces. It implements Kohn-Sham density functional theory (DFT) in terms of the all-electron full-potential linearized augmented-plane-wave method. With this, it is a realization of one of the most precise DFT methodologies. The code has the common features of a modern DFT simulation package. In the past, major applications have been in the field of magnetism, spintronics, quantum materials, e.g. in ultrathin films, complex magnetism like in spin spirals or magnetic Skyrmion lattices, and in spin-orbit related physics, e.g. in graphene and topological insulators.

== Simulation model ==
The physical model used in Fleur simulations is based on the (F)LAPW(+LO) method, but it is also possible to make use of an APW+lo description. The calculations employ the scalar-relativistic approximation for the kinetic energy operator. Spin-orbit coupling can optionally be included. It is possible to describe noncollinear magnetic structures periodic in the unit cell. The description of spin spirals with deviating periodicity is based on the generalized Bloch theorem. The code offers native support for the description of three-dimensional periodic structures, i.e., bulk crystals, as well as two-dimensional periodic structures like thin films and surfaces. For the description of the exchange-correlation functional different parametrizations for the local density approximation, several generalized-gradient approximations, Hybrid functionals, and partial support for the libXC library are implemented. It is also possible to make use of a DFT+U description.

== Features ==
The Fleur code can be used to directly calculate many different material properties. Among these are:

- The total energy
- Forces on atoms
- Density of states (including projections onto individual atoms and orbitals characters)
- Band structures (including projections onto individual atoms and orbitals characters and band unfolding)
- Charges, magnetic moments, and orbital moments at individual atoms
- Electric multipole moments and magnetic dipole moments
- Heisenberg interaction parameters (via the magnetic force theorem or via comparing different magnetic structures)
- Magnetocrystalline anisotropy energy (via the magnetic force theorem or via comparing different magnetic structures)
- Dzyaloshinskii-Moriya interaction parameters (via the magnetic force theorem or via comparing different magnetic structures)
- Spin-spiral dispersion relations (via the magnetic force theorem or via comparing different magnetic structures)
- EELS spectra
- Magnetic circular dichroism spectra
- The Work function for surfaces

For the calculation of optical properties Fleur can be combined with the Spex code to perform calculations employing the GW approximation to many-body perturbation theory. Together with the Wannier90 library it is also possible to extract the Kohn-Sham eigenfunctions in terms of Wannier functions.

== See also ==
- List of quantum chemistry and solid state physics software
