= Cobalt germanide =

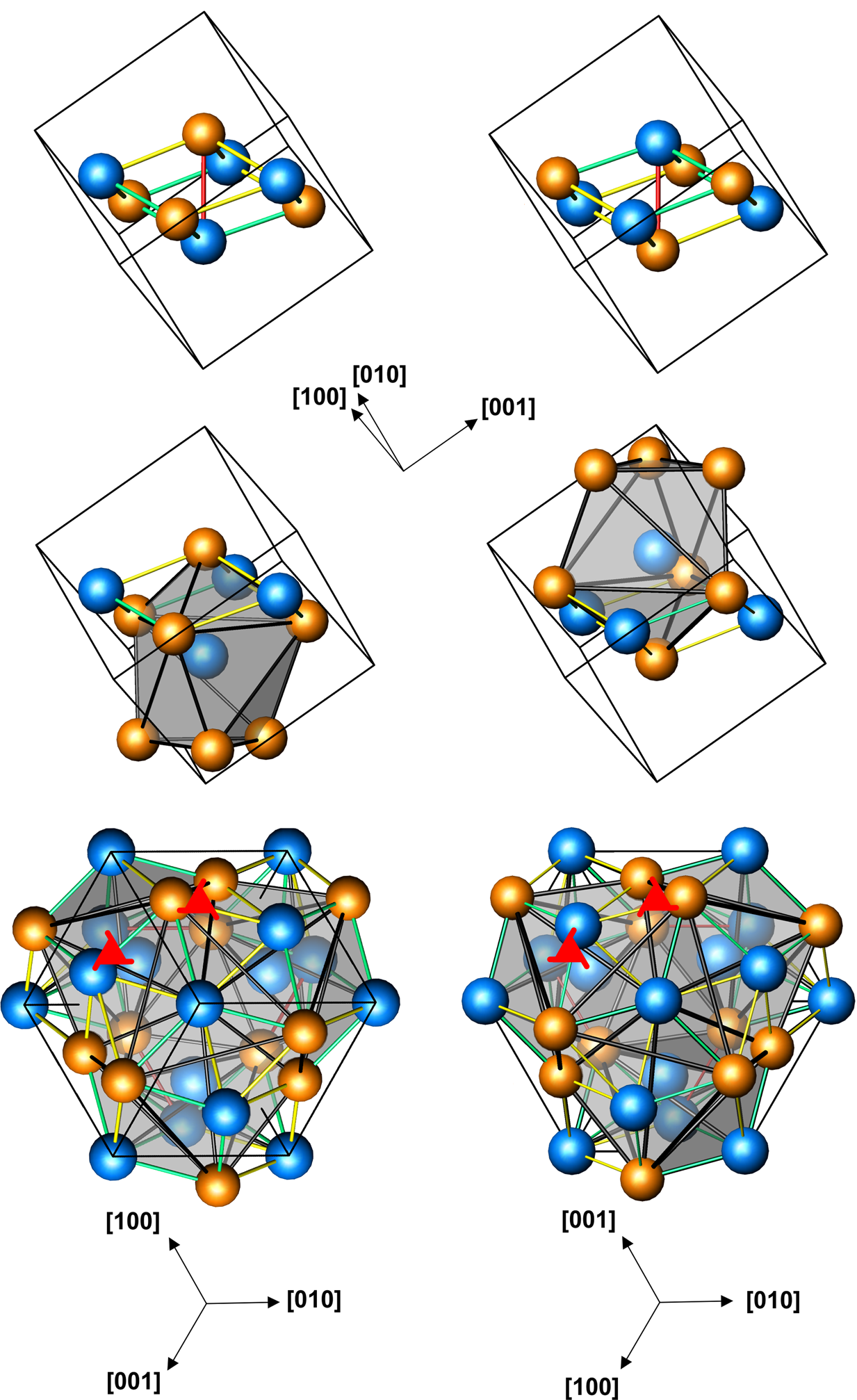
- Structures of left-handed and right-handed cubic CoGe crystals (3 presentations, with different numbers of atoms per unit cell; orange atoms are Ge)

Names
- IUPAC name Cobalt germanide

Identifiers
CAS Number	12292-35-2
3D model (JSmol)	Interactive image
PubChem CID	78062144
CompTox Dashboard (EPA)	DTXSID70779312
- InChI: InChI=1S/Co.Ge Key: DDHRUTNUHBNAHW-UHFFFAOYSA-N
- SMILES: [Co].[Ge]

Properties
Chemical formula	CoGe
Molar mass	131.56 g/mol
Magnetic susceptibility (χ)	1.3×10^{−6} emu/g

Structure
Crystal structure	Monoclinic
Space group	C2/m (No. 12), mS16
Lattice constant	a = 1.165 nm, b = 0.3807 nm, c = 0.4945 nm α = 90°, β = 101.1°, γ = 90°
Formula units (Z)	8

Hazards
Flash point	Non-flammable

Related compounds
Other anions	Cobalt silicide
Other cations	Iron germanide Manganese germanide
- Except where otherwise noted, data are given for materials in their standard state (at 25 °C [77 °F], 100 kPa). (what is ?) Infobox references

Cobalt germanide (CoGe) is an intermetallic compound, a germanide of cobalt.

Cubic CoGe crystals (space group P2_{1}3, cP8, a = 0.4631 nm) can be produced by processing a mixture of Co and Ge powders at a pressure of 4 GPa and a temperature of 800–1000 °C for 1 to 3 hours. They have no inversion center, and are therefore helical, with right-hand and left-handed chiralities. The cubic CoGe is metastable, and converts into a monoclinic phase upon subsequent heating to 600 °C at ambient pressure.

Cubic CoGe is an antiferromagnet with a transition temperature T_{c} of 132 K.
