= Manganese germanide =

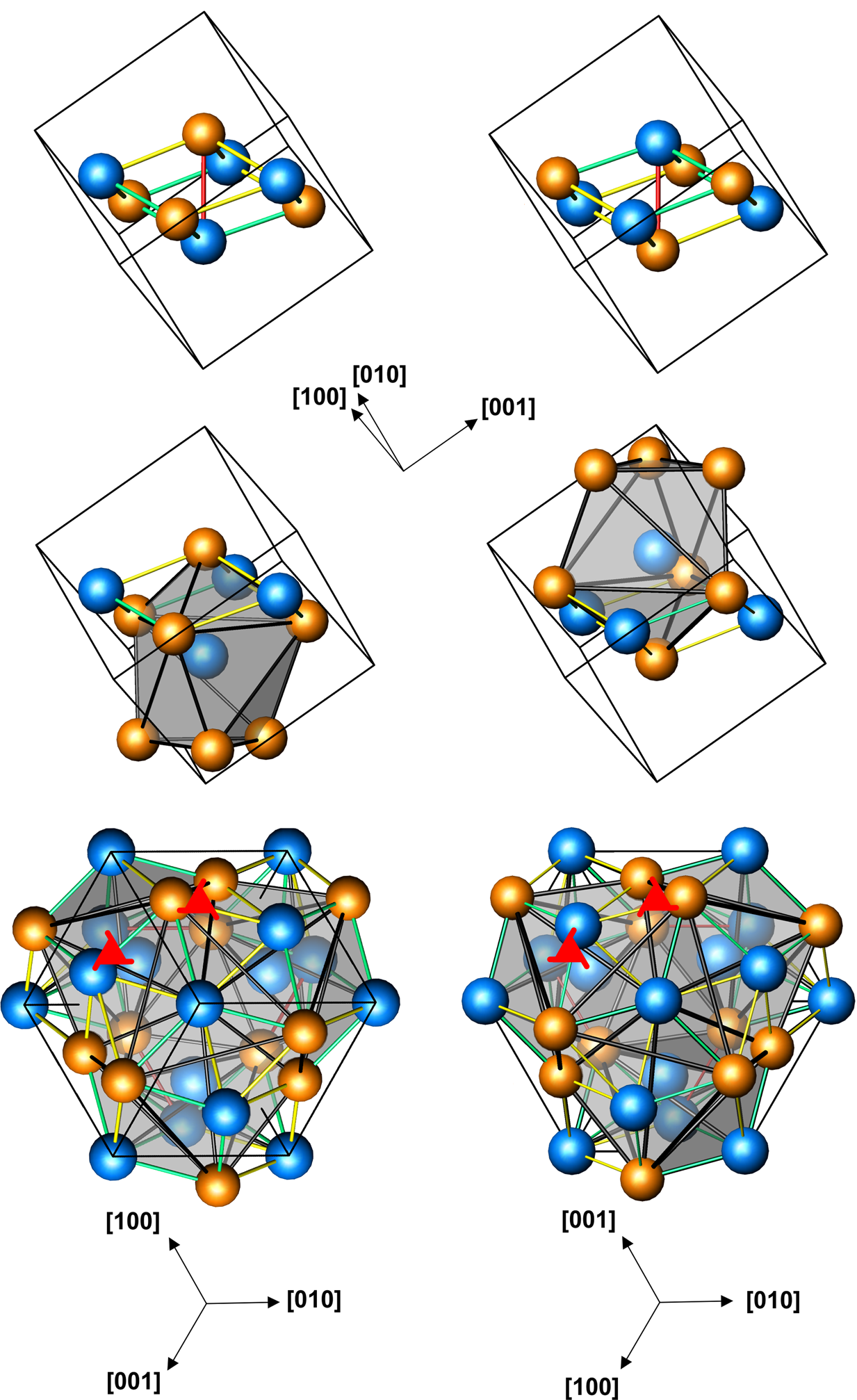
- Structures of left-handed and right-handed MnGe crystals (3 presentations, with different numbers of atoms per unit cell; orange atoms are Ge)

Names
- IUPAC name Manganese germanide

Identifiers
CAS Number	59125-33-6
3D model (JSmol)	Interactive image
PubChem CID	57481451
CompTox Dashboard (EPA)	DTXSID70851985
- InChI: InChI=1S/Mn.Ge Key: WWFYEXUJLWHZEX-UHFFFAOYSA-N
- SMILES: [Mn].[Ge]

Properties
Chemical formula	MnGe
Molar mass	127.57 g/mol
Magnetic susceptibility (χ)	2.17×10^{−6} emu/g

Structure
Crystal structure	Cubic
Space group	P2_{1}3 (No. 198), cP8
Lattice constant	a = 0.4795 nm
Formula units (Z)	4

Hazards
Flash point	Non-flammable

Related compounds
Other anions	Manganese silicide
Other cations	Iron germanide Cobalt germanide
- Except where otherwise noted, data are given for materials in their standard state (at 25 °C [77 °F], 100 kPa). (what is ?) Infobox references

Manganese germanide (MnGe) is an intermetallic compound, a germanide of manganese. Its crystals have a cubic symmetry with no inversion center, they are therefore helical, with right-hand and left-handed chiralities.

== Magnetism ==
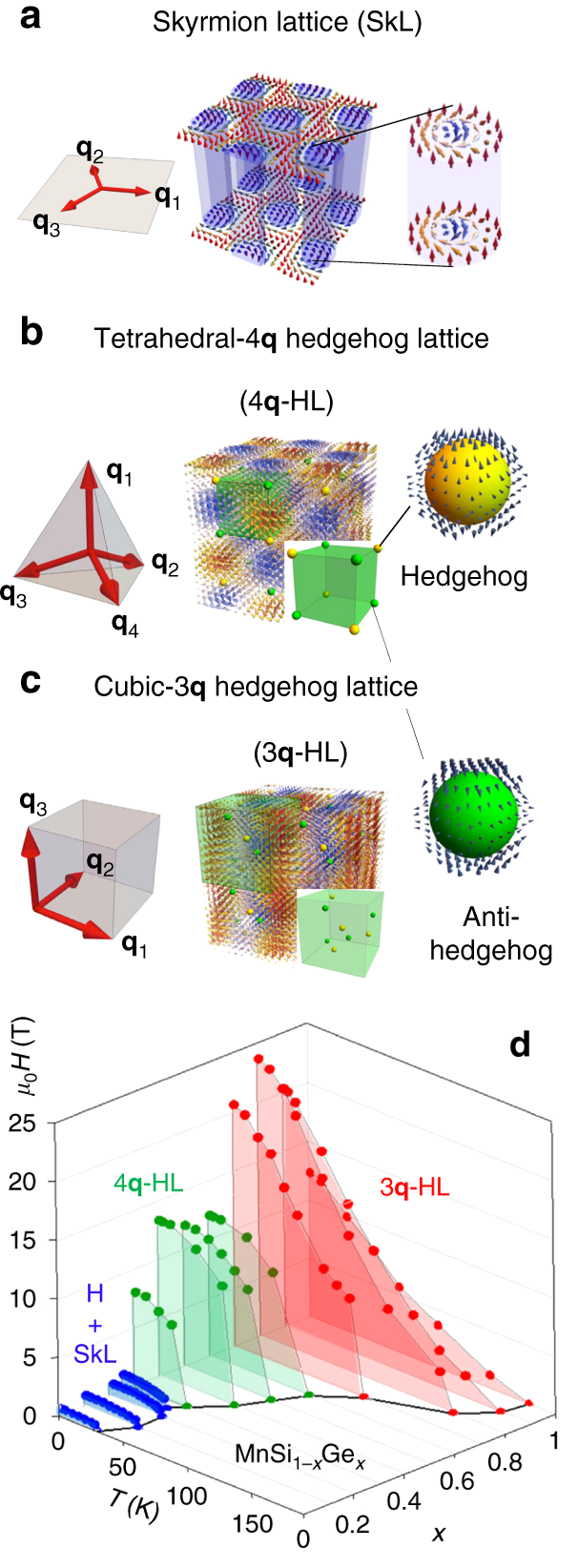
Experimental phase diagram of MnSi_{1−x}Ge_{x} alloys, revealing magnetic skyrmion, tetrahedral and cubic hedgehog spin arrangements at different compositions x.

At low temperatures, MnGe and its relative MnSi exhibit unusual spatial arrangements of electron spin, which were named magnetic skyrmion, tetrahedral and cubic hedgehog lattices. Their structure can be controlled not only by the Si/Ge ratio, but also by temperature and magnetic field. This property has potential application in ultrahigh-density magnetic storage devices.

== Synthesis ==
MnGe crystals can be produced by processing a mixture of Mn and Ge powders at a pressure of 4–5 GPa and a temperature of 600–1000 °C for 1–3 hours. They are metastable and decompose into Mn_{11}Ge_{8} and Ge upon subsequent heating to 600 °C at ambient pressure.

== Structure ==
Manganese germanide is a non-stoichiometric compound where the Ge:Mn ratio often deviates from 1. The Mn_{3}Ge_{5} compound is a Nowotny phase exhibiting a chimney ladder structure. It is either a semimetal or a narrow-gap semiconductor.
