= Iron phosphide =

Chemical compound

Identifiers
CAS Number	26508-33-8
3D model (JSmol)	Interactive image
ChemSpider	140223
ECHA InfoCard	100.043.395
EC Number	247-751-2
PubChem CID	117803
CompTox Dashboard (EPA)	DTXSID5067215
- InChI: Key: DPTATFGPDCLUTF-UHFFFAOYSA-N; InChI=1S/3Fe.H3P/h;;;1H3
- SMILES: [Fe]#P

Properties
Chemical formula	FeP
Molar mass	86.819 g·mol^{−1}
Density	6.74 g/cm^{3}
Melting point	1,100 °C (2,010 °F; 1,370 K)
Solubility in water	Insoluble in water
Solubility	soluble in nitric acid, HF, aqua regia insoluble in dilute acid, alkalis

Structure
Crystal structure	MnP type (Orthorhombic)
Space group	Pnma (No. 62)
Lattice constant	a = 519.1 pm, b = 309.9 pm, c = 579.2 pm
Lattice volume (V)	93.2 Å^{3}

Related compounds
Other cations	Chromium phosphide Manganese phosphide Cobalt phosphide Tungsten phosphide Ruthenium phosphide
Related compounds	Fe_{2}P; Fe_{3}P
- Except where otherwise noted, data are given for materials in their standard state (at 25 °C [77 °F], 100 kPa). verify (what is ?) Infobox references

Iron phosphide is a chemical compound of iron and phosphorus, with a formula of FeP. Crystals are isolated as grey needles.

Manufacturing of iron phosphide takes place at elevated temperatures, where the elements combine directly. Iron phosphide reacts with moisture and acids producing phosphine (PH_{3}), a toxic and pyrophoric gas.

Iron phosphide is a good electric and heat conductor.

Below a Néel temperature of about 119 K (−154 °C), FeP takes on an helimagnetic structure.
