= Manganese monosilicide =

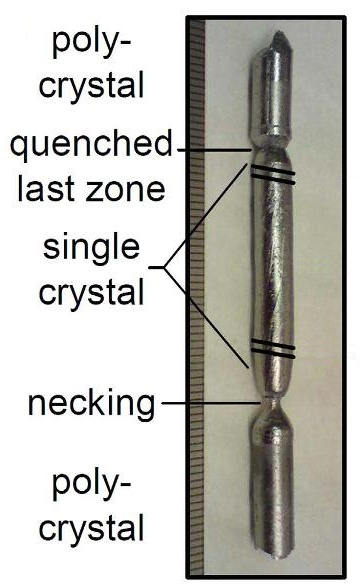
- MnSi prepared by zone melting

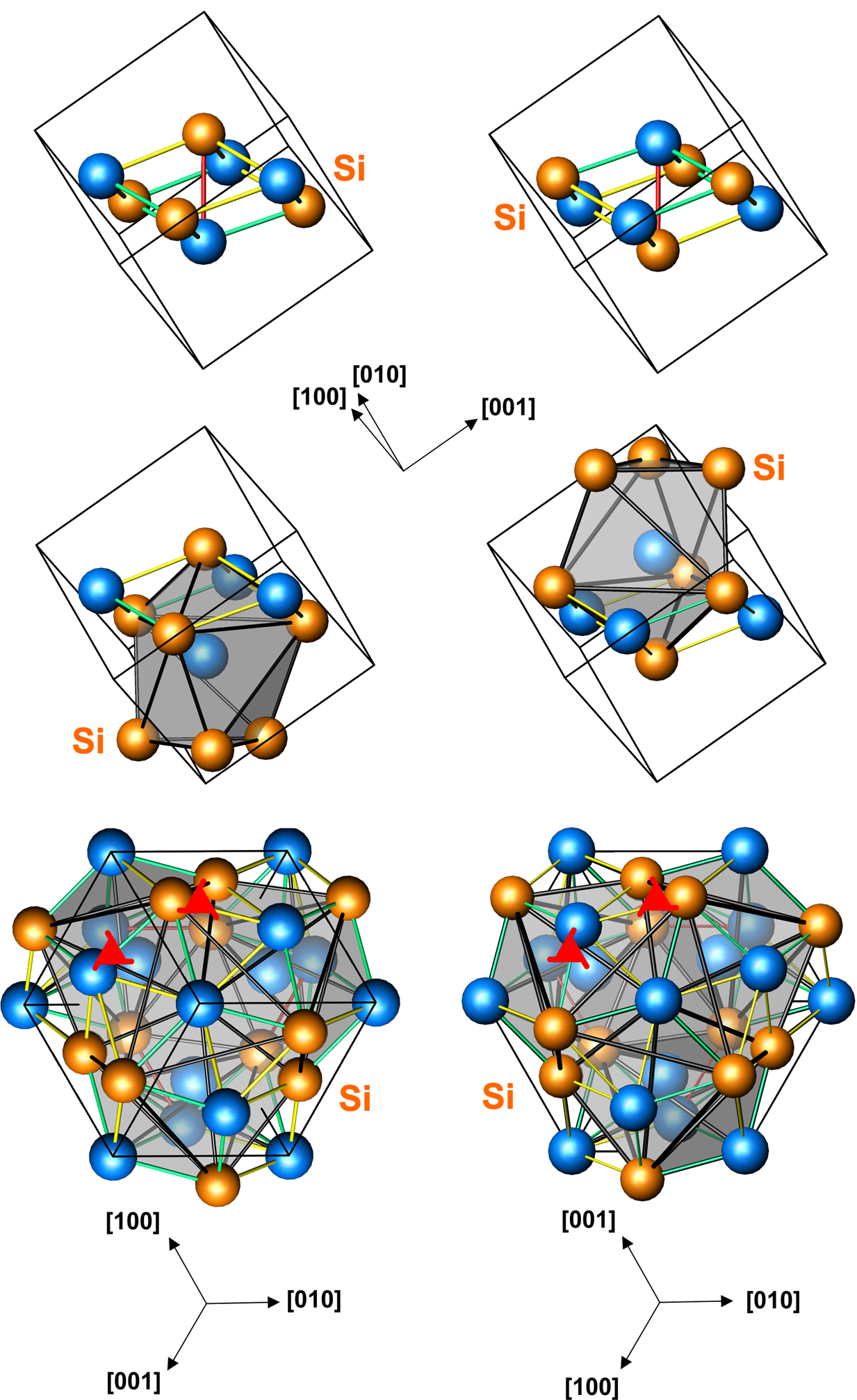
- Structures of left-handed and right-handed MnSi crystals (3 presentations, with different numbers of atoms per unit cell)

Names
- IUPAC name Manganese silicide

Identifiers
CAS Number	12626-89-0
3D model (JSmol)	Interactive image
ChemSpider	129548924
PubChem CID	49854137
- InChI: InChI=1S/Mn.Si Key: PYLLWONICXJARP-UHFFFAOYSA-N
- SMILES: [Si].[Mn]

Properties
Chemical formula	MnSi
Molar mass	83.023 g/mol
Density	5.16
Melting point	1,280 °C (2,340 °F; 1,550 K)
Magnetic susceptibility (χ)	31.3×10^{−6} emu/g
Thermal conductivity	0.1 W/(cm·K)

Structure
Crystal structure	Cubic
Space group	P2_{1}3 (No. 198), cP8
Lattice constant	a = 0.45598(2) nm
Formula units (Z)	4

Hazards
Flash point	Non-flammable

Related compounds
Other anions	Manganese germanide
Other cations	Iron silicide Cobalt silicide
Related compounds	Manganese disilicide; Mn_{5}Si_{3}; Mn_{3}Si; Mn_{11}Si_{9}
- Except where otherwise noted, data are given for materials in their standard state (at 25 °C [77 °F], 100 kPa). (what is ?) Infobox references

Manganese monosilicide (MnSi) is an intermetallic compound, a silicide of manganese. It occurs in cosmic dust as the mineral brownleeite. MnSi has a cubic crystal lattice with no inversion center; therefore its crystal structure is helical, with right-hand and left-hand chiralities.

MnSi is a paramagnetic metal that turns into a ferromagnet at cryogenic temperatures below 29 K. In the ferromagnetic state, the spatial arrangement of electron spins in MnSi changes with magnetic field, forming helical, conical, skyrmion, and regular ferromagnetic phases.

== Crystal structure and magnetism ==
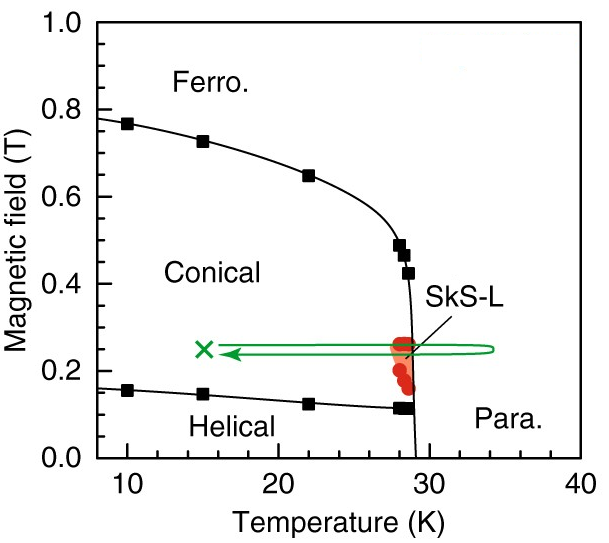
Magnetic phase diagram of MnSi. At low temperatures, with increasing magnetic field, spins in MnSi form helical, conical, skyrmion (SkS) and regular ferromagnetic spatial structures. At high temperatures the spin orientation is random (paramagnetic)

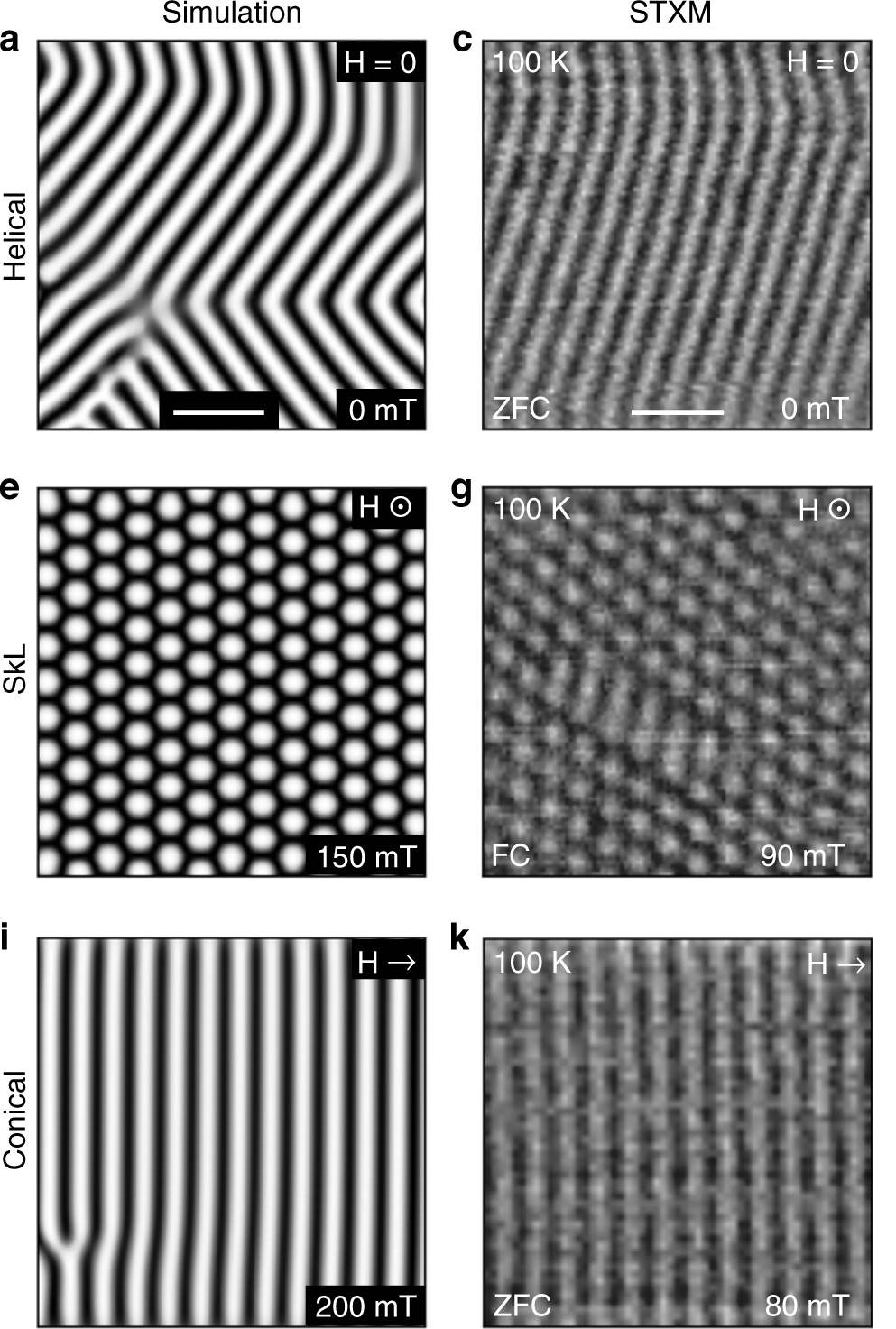
Simulated and measured (by STXM) images of helical, skyrmion and conical phases in FeGe. All magnetic properties are very similar in FeGe and MnSi, except for T_{c} values.

Manganese monosilicide is a non-stoichiometric compound, meaning that the 1:1 Mn:Si composition, lattice constant and many other properties vary depending on the synthesis and processing history of the crystal.

MnSi has a cubic crystal lattice with no inversion center; therefore its crystal structure is helical, with right-hand and left-hand chiralities. At low temperatures and magnetic fields, the magnetic structure of MnSi can be described as a stack of ferromagnetically ordered layers lying parallel to the (111) crystallographic planes. The direction of magnetic moment varies from layer to layer by a small angle due to the antisymmetric exchange.

Upon cooling to temperatures below T_{c} = 29 K, MnSi changes from a paramagnetic into a ferromagnetic state; the transition temperature T_{c} decreases with increasing pressure, vanishing at 1.4 GPa.

Electron spins in MnSi show dissimilar, yet regular spatial arrangements at different values of applied magnetic field. Those arrangements are named helical, skyrmion, conical, and regular ferromagnetic. They can be controlled not only by temperature and magnetic field, but also by electric current, and the current density required for manipulating skyrmions (~10^{6} A/m^{2}) is approximately one million times smaller than that needed for moving magnetic domains in traditional ferromagnets. As a result, skyrmions in MnSi have potential application in ultrahigh-density magnetic storage devices.

== Synthesis ==
Centimeter-scale single crystals of MnSi can be prepared by direct crystallization from the melt using the Bridgman, zone melting or Czochralski methods.
