= Magnetic skyrmionium =

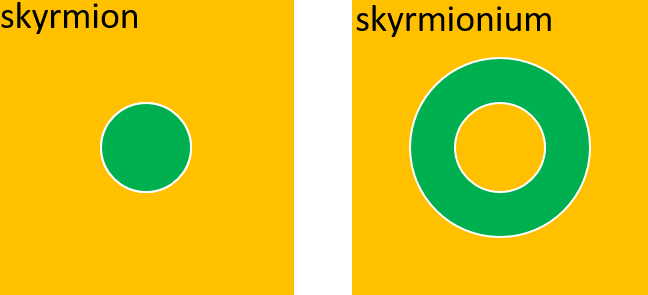
Out-of-plane spin texture of a skyrmion and skyrmionium. Green colour represents spins that point out of the screen and yellow colour represents spins that point into the screen.

In magnetic systems, excitations can be found that are characterized by the orientation of the local magnetic moments of atomic cores. A magnetic skyrmionium is a ring-shaped topological spin texture and is closely related to the magnetic skyrmion.

== Topological charge ==
The topological charge can be defined as follows.

$Q=\int \vec{m}(\vec{r})\cdot (\partial_x \vec{m}(\vec{r}) \times \partial_y \vec{m}(\vec{r})) dr^2/4\pi$

With this definition, the topological charge of a skyrmion can be calculated to be ±1. A magnetic skyrmionium is a topological quasi particle that is composed of a superposition of two magnetic skyrmions of opposite topological charge adding up to zero total topological charge. On this basis one can view the core of a skyrmionium as a skyrmion (yellow central disk in figure) with opposite charge compared to a bigger skyrmion (green disk) in which it is situated.

Magnetic Particles and their topological charge
Spin-Texture	Topological Charge
Skyrmion	±1
Skyrmionium	0
Skyrmion-bag with n Skyrmion	±n

Different to magnetic skyrmions, that experience a transverse deflection under current driven motion known as the skyrmion Hall effect (similar to the Hall effect), magnetic skyrmioniums are expected to move parallel to electrical-drive currents. The current-driven motion of magnetic excitations is one example of the direct link between topological charge and a physical observable.

== Theoretical predictions ==
Skyrmioniums have been the subject of numerous theoretical investigations. Besides theoretical predictions concerning the existence of skyrmioniums such as in the 2D Janus mono layer CrGe(Se,Te)_{3}, a lot of research concentrated on their manipulation by electrical currents, spin currents or spin waves. So far, there is only little experimental evidence for the existence of magnetic skyrmioniums. One example is the observation of skyrmionium in a NiFe-CrSb_{2}Te_{3} hetero-structure.

== Potential applications ==
Magnetic excitations such as skyrmions or skyrmioniums are potential building blocks of next generation spintronic devices, which enable for instance neuromorphic computing.
