= Germanide halide =

Germanide halides are compound that include the germanide (Ge^{4−}) anion and a halide such as chloride (Cl^{−}), bromide (Br^{−}) or iodide (I^{−}). They include germanide iodides, germanide bromides or germanide chlorides. They can be considered as mixed anion compounds. They are in the category of tetrelidehalides. Related compounds include the silicide iodides, and carbide iodides.

== List ==
=== Chlorides ===
formula	system	space group	unit cell Å	volume	density	comment	ref
La_{3}Cl_{2}Ge_{3}	monoclinic	C2/m	a=18.047 b=4.927 c=10.739 β=98.25 Z=4	824.2	5.685	air and water sensitive	

=== Bromides ===
formula	system	space group	unit cell Å	volume	density	comment	ref
Br_{2}Ge_{3}La_{3}	monoclinic	C2/m	a =18.622 b =4.3263 c =10.897 β =98° Z=4	869.4	6.069	air and water sensitive	
Gd_{2}GeBr_{2}	trigonal	R3̅m	a = 4.1442, c = 29.487				
Gd_{2}GeBr_{2}	trigonal	P3̅m1	a = 4.1668, c = 9.8173			semiconductor	

=== Iodides ===
formula	system	space group	unit cell Å	volume	density	comment	ref
Y_{2}GeI_{2}	trigonal	R3̅m	a = 4.2135 c = 31.480 Z=3	484	5.19	bronze	
GeI_{2}La_{2}	trigonal	P3̅m1	a=4.45 c=10.868 Z=1	186.46	3.381	air and water sensitive	
GeI_{2}La_{2}	trigonal	R3̅m	a=4.465 c=32.591 Z=3	562.7	5.349	air and water sensitive	
Ge_{2}I_{2}La_{2}	trigonal	P3̅m1	a=4.272 c=11.8349 Z=1	187.11	6.006	air and water sensitive	
GeI_{3}La_{3}	cubic	I4_{1}32	a=12.6036 Z=8	2002.1	5.773	air and water sensitive	
Ge_{3}I_{5}La_{6}	monooclinic	C2/m	a=19.338 b=4.423 c=14.895, β=128.16° Z=2	1001.7	5.589	air and water sensitive	
GeI_{12}La_{7}	trigonal	R3̅	a=16.122 c =10.768 Z=3	2423.8	5.487	air and water sensitive	
Gd_{2}GeI_{2}	trigonal	R3̅m	a = 4.2527 c = 31.657 Z=3	495.84	6.44	bronze	
