= Brownleeite =

Silicide mineral

General
- Category: Native element class, Fersilicite group
- Formula: MnSi
- IMA symbol: Bwn
- Strunz classification: 1.XX.00
- Dana classification: 01.01.23.07
- Crystal system: Isometric
- Crystal class: Tetartoidal (23); H-M symbol: (23)
- Space group: P2_{1}3

Identification
- Crystal habit: Cubic grain in microscopic dust particle (< 2.5 μm)

Brownleeite is a silicide mineral with chemical formula MnSi. It was discovered by researchers of the Johnson Space Center in Houston in April 2003 while analyzing the Pi Puppid particle shower of the comet 26P/Grigg-Skjellerup. The only other known natural manganese silicide is mavlyanovite, Mn_{5}Si_{3}.

== Overview ==
The particles were collected from the stratosphere over south-western US in April 2003 using an ER-2 high-altitude research aircraft of NASA. The team of researchers from US, Germany and Japan was led by NASA scientist Keiko Nakamura-Messenger.

To determine the mineral's origin and examine other dust materials, a new transmission electron microscope was installed in 2005 at Johnson Space Center.

The mineral name was approved by the International Mineralogical Association (IMA Number 2008-011). The NASA scientists named the mineral after Donald E. Brownlee, professor of astronomy at the University of Washington, Seattle, because of his pioneering research on interplanetary dust particles.

== See also ==
- Comet dust
