= Igor Dzyaloshinskii =

Russian theoretical physicist (1931–2021)

- Игорь Дзялошинский
- Born: February 1, 1931; Moscow, Soviet Union
- Died: July 14, 2021 (aged 90)
- Education: Moscow State University
- Known for: Dzyaloshinskii–Moriya interaction
- Scientific career
- Fields: Theoretical physics
- Workplaces: Moscow State University; Moscow Institute of Physics and Technology; University of California, Irvine

Igor Ekhielevich Dzyaloshinskii, (Игорь Ехиельевич Дзялошинский, surname sometimes transliterated as Dzyaloshinsky, Dzyaloshinski, Dzyaloshinskiĭ, or Dzyaloshinkiy, 1 February 1931 – 14 July 2021) was a Russian theoretical physicist, known for his research on "magnetism, multiferroics, one-dimensional conductors, liquid crystals, van der Waals forces, and applications of methods of quantum field theory". In particular he is known for the Dzyaloshinskii–Moriya interaction.

== Biography ==
He was born in Moscow to a Jewish family. His father, Yechiel Moiseevich Dzyaloshinskii (1897–1942), a native of Kalush, Ukraine, died in captivity in early 1942.

The first in his family to attend a university, Igor E. Dzyaloshinskii graduated in 1953 from the faculty of physics of Moscow State University.

Dzyaloshinski pursued graduate study at the Institute of Physics of the Russian Academy of Sciences, where he received in 1957 his Russian Candidate of Sciences degree (Ph.D.) with a thesis on weak ferromagnetism under the supervision of Lev Landau. Weak ferromagnetism is "a small spontaneous magnetic moment in certain classes of antiferromagnetic materials". Its explanation involves exchange interactions based upon "concepts of the magnetic symmetry of crystals".

In 1962 Dzyaloshinskii received his Russian Doctor of Sciences degree (habilitation). His Russian doctoral thesis dealt with application of quantum field theory methods in statistical physics. In 1964 he was one of the founding members of the Landau Institute for Theoretical Physics in Moscow. He was until 1972 a professor at the Moscow Institute of Physics and Technology and from 1972 to 1989 at Moscow State University.

Between 1958 and 1961, with Alexei Abrikosov and Lev Gor'kov, he published important works on the application of methods of quantum field theory in statistical physics (e.g. the theory of superconductivity) and many-particle theory, about which the three also wrote an outstanding textbook Методы квантовой теории поля в статистической физике, which was published in Russian in 1961 and in English translation as Quantum field theory methods in statistical physics in 1963. Dzaloshinskii did important research with Lev Pitaevskii in solving "the problem of the van der Waals forces between bodies separated by an absorbing liquid" and with Yury Bychkov and Lev Gor'kov on the "problem of superconducting and charge-density-wave instabilities in 1D conductors". Dzyaloshinskii and Anatoly Larkin in the 1970s published "a solution to the Luttinger-liquid problem that is central to the theory of 1D Fermi systems and to the bosonization technique."

In 1991 he immigrated to the United States and soon became a professor at the University of California, Irvine (UCI), where he eventually retired as professor emeritus. In the last years of his career, he did research on violation of time-parity in magneto-optics and the condensed matter physics of Fermi liquids and non-Fermi liquids.

Dzyaloshinskii applied diagram methods to finite-temperature transport problems. He conjectured the existence of phase transitions without fixed points of the renormalization group. He was involved in the formulation of the Matsubara formalism (Takeo Matsubara, 1955).

Dzyaloshinskii was awarded in 1972 the Lomonosov Prize, in 1975 the Order of the Badge of Honour, in 1981 the Order of the Red Banner of Labour, in 1984 the USSR State Prize, and in 1989 the Landau Prize. He was elected in 1974 a corresponding member of the Soviet Academy of Sciences, in 1991 an honorary foreign member of the American Academy of Arts & Sciences, in 1996 a fellow of the American Physical Society, and in 2002 a fellow of the American Association for the Advancement of Science.

He married in 1960. Upon his death, he was survived by his widow, their daughter, three grandchildren, and two great-grandchildren.

== Selected publications ==
=== Articles ===
- I. Dzyaloshinskii (1958). "A thermodynamic theory of "weak" ferromagnetism of antiferromagnetics". Journal of Physics and Chemistry of Solids. 4 (4): 241. Bibcode:1958JPCS....4..241D. doi:10.1016/0022-3697(58)90076-3.
- Gorkov, Abrikosov, & Dzyaloshinski On the application of Quantum field theory methods to problems of quantum statistics at finite temperature, Sov.Phys.JETP, Vol. 9, 1959, p. 636 (JETP, Vol. 36, 1959, p. 900)
- Dzyaloshinskii, I.E.; Lifshitz, E.M.; Pitaevskii, L.P. (1961). "The general theory of van der Waals forces". Advances in Physics. 10 (38): 165–209. doi:10.1080/00018736100101281.
- Derjaguin, B. V.; Dzyaloshinsky, I. E.; Koptelova, M. M.; Pitayevsky, L. P. (1965). "Molecular-surface forces in binary solutions". Discussions of the Faraday Society. 40: 246–252. doi:10.1039/DF9654000246.
- Dzyaloshinskii, I.E.; Volovick, G.E. (1980). "Poisson brackets in condensed matter physics". Annals of Physics. 125 (1): 67–97. Bibcode:1980AnPhy.125...67D. doi:10.1016/0003-4916(80)90119-0.
- Brazovskii, S.A.; Dzyaloshinskii, I.E.; Krichever, I.M. (1982). "Exactly soluble Peierls models". Physics Letters A. 91 (1): 40–42. Bibcode:1982PhLA...91...40B. doi:10.1016/0375-9601(82)90260-2.
- Brazovskii, S. A.; Dzyaloshinskii, I. E.; Muratov, A. R. (1987). "Theory of weak crystallization" (PDF). Zh. Eksp. Teor. Fiz. 93: 1110–1124.
- Dzyaloshinskii, Igor (1992). "Effects of the finite proton mass in a hydrogen atom in crossed magnetic and electric fields: A state with a giant electric dipole moment". Physics Letters A. 165 (1): 69–71. Bibcode:1992PhLA..165...69D. doi:10.1016/0375-9601(92)91056-W.
- Dzyaloshinskii, I.E.; Lifshitz, E.M.; Pitaevskii, L.P.; Priestley, M.G. (1992). "The general theory of van der Waals forces". Perspectives in Theoretical Physics. pp. 443–492. doi:10.1016/B978-0-08-036364-6.50039-9. ISBN 978-0-08-036364-6.
- Dzyaloshinskii, I.E.; Lifshitz, E.M.; Pitaevskii, L.P.; Ter Haar, D. (1992). "Van der Waals forces in liquid films". Perspectives in Theoretical Physics. pp. 425–441. doi:10.1016/B978-0-08-036364-6.50038-7. ISBN 978-0-08-036364-6.
- Dzyaloshinskii, Igor (1992). "External magnetic fields of antiferromagnets". Solid State Communications. 82 (7): 579–580. Bibcode:1992SSCom..82..579D. doi:10.1016/0038-1098(92)90236-3.
- Dzyaloshinskii, Igor; Papamichail, E. V. (1995). "Nonreciprocal Optical Rotation in Antiferromagnets". Physical Review Letters. 75 (16): 3004–3007. Bibcode:1995PhRvL..75.3004D. doi:10.1103/PhysRevLett.75.3004. PMID 10059464.
- Bychkov, Yu. A.; Gor'kov, L. P.; Dzyaloshinskiĭ, I. E. (1996). "Possibility of Superconductivity Type Phenomena in a One-Dimensional System". 30 Years of the Landau Institute — Selected Papers. World Scientific Series in 20th Century Physics. Vol. 11. pp. 1–13. doi:10.1142/9789814317344_0001. ISBN 978-981-02-2253-6.
- Anisimov, S. I.; Dzyaloshinskiĭ, I. E. (1996). "A New Type of Disclination in Liquid Crystals and the Stability of Disclinations of Various Types". 30 Years of the Landau Institute — Selected Papers. World Scientific Series in 20th Century Physics. Vol. 11. pp. 81–86. doi:10.1142/9789814317344_0012. ISBN 978-981-02-2253-6.
- Dzyaloshinskii, Igor (1996). "Extended Van-Hove Singularity and Related Non-Fermi Liquids". Journal de Physique I. 6 (1): 119–135. Bibcode:1996JPhy1...6..119D. doi:10.1051/jp1:1996127.
- Zheleznyak, Anatoley T.; Yakovenko, Victor M.; Dzyaloshinskii, Igor E. (1997). "Parquet solution for a flat Fermi surface". Physical Review B. 55 (5): 3200–3215. arXiv:cond-mat/9609118. Bibcode:1997PhRvB..55.3200Z. doi:10.1103/PhysRevB.55.3200. S2CID 118991378.
- Mills, D. L.; Dzyaloshinskii, I. E. (2008). "Influence of electric fields on spin waves in simple ferromagnets: Role of the flexoelectric interaction". Physical Review B. 78 (18) 184422. Bibcode:2008PhRvB..78r4422M. doi:10.1103/PhysRevB.78.184422.
- Dzyaloshinskii, I.E.; Mills, D.L. (2009). "Intrinsic paramagnetism of ferroelectrics". Philosophical Magazine. 89 (22–24): 2079–2082. Bibcode:2009PMag...89.2079D. doi:10.1080/14786430802653410. S2CID 123509459.
- Fechner, M.; Spaldin, N. A.; Dzyaloshinskii, I. E. (2014). "Magnetic field generated by a charge in a uniaxial magnetoelectric material". Physical Review B. 89 (18) 184415. arXiv:1401.2388. Bibcode:2014PhRvB..89r4415F. doi:10.1103/PhysRevB.89.184415. S2CID 118353013.
- Meier, Q. N.; Fechner, M.; Nozaki, T.; Sahashi, M.; Salman, Z.; Prokscha, T.; Suter, A.; Schoenherr, P.; Lilienblum, M.; Borisov, P.; Dzyaloshinskii, I. E.; Fiebig, M.; Luetkens, H.; Spaldin, N. A. (2019). "Search for the Magnetic Monopole at a Magnetoelectric Surface". Physical Review X. 9 (1) 011011. arXiv:1804.07694. Bibcode:2019PhRvX...9a1011M. doi:10.1103/PhysRevX.9.011011. S2CID 119056720.

=== Books ===
- Abrikosov, Gorkov, & Dzyaloshinskii Quantum field theory methods in statistical physics, Prentice Hall 1963, 2nd edition Pergamon Press 1965, new edition Dover 1975
