= Iron monosilicide =

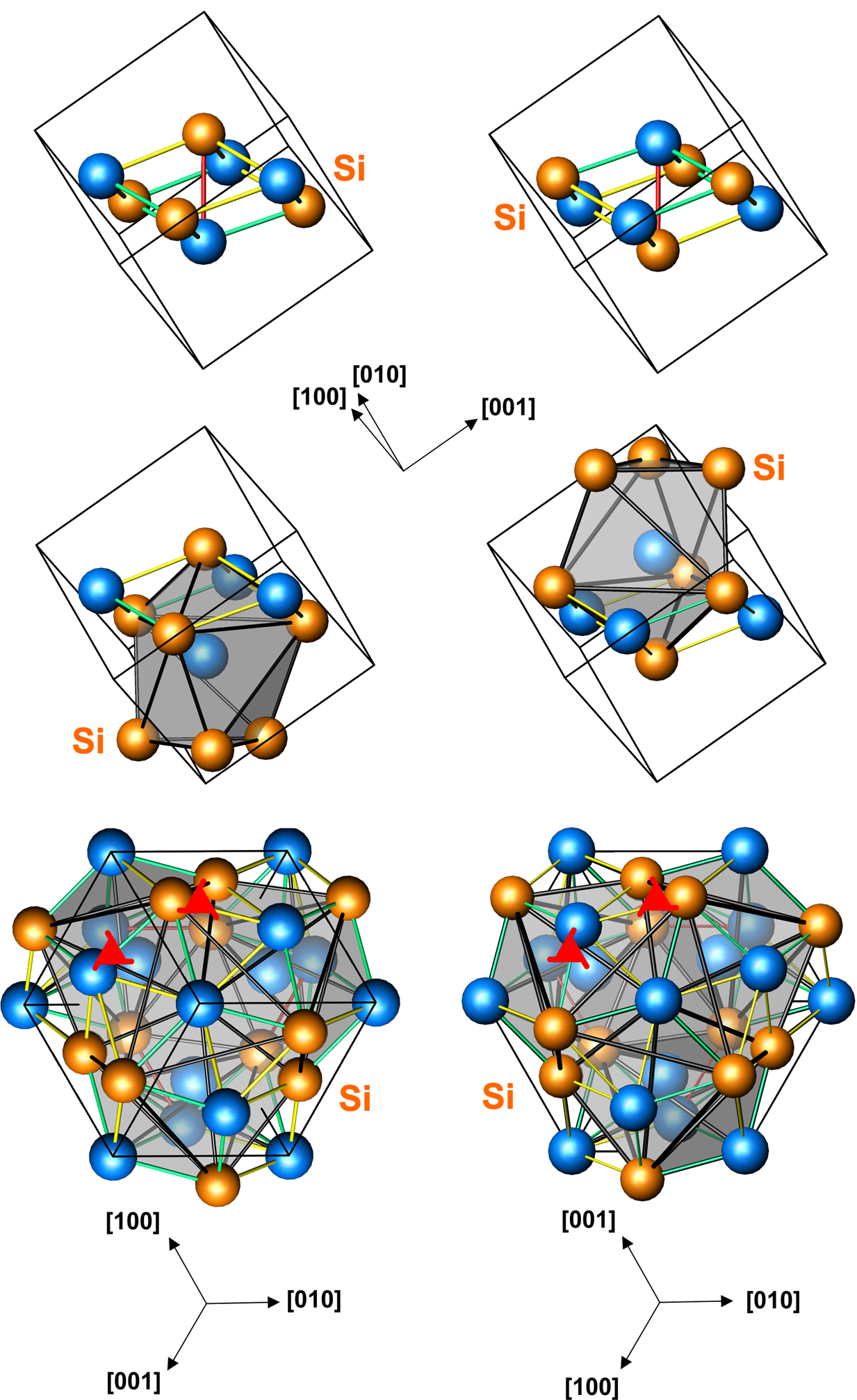
- Structures of left-handed and right-handed FeSi crystals. The top presentation shows the eight atoms of the unit cell. The middle shows polyhedra surrounding the iron atoms. The bottom show the presence of 3-fold screw axes.

Names
- IUPAC name Iron silicide
- Other names Naquite, fersilicite

Identifiers
CAS Number	12022-95-6
3D model (JSmol)	Interactive image
ChemSpider	13077547
ECHA InfoCard	100.031.506
EC Number	234-670-2
PubChem CID	13956050
UNII	A3I5H1663X
CompTox Dashboard (EPA)	DTXSID40892426
- InChI: InChI=1S/Fe.Si Key: XWHPIFXRKKHEKR-UHFFFAOYSA-N
- SMILES: [Si].[Fe]

Properties
Chemical formula	FeSi
Molar mass	83.931 g/mol
Appearance	gray cubic crystals
Density	6.1 g/cm^{3}
Melting point	1,410 °C (2,570 °F; 1,680 K)
Band gap	0.05 eV (ind.); 0.14 eV (dir.)
Magnetic susceptibility (χ)	8.5×10^{−6} emu/g

Structure
Crystal structure	Cubic
Space group	P2_{1}3 (No. 198), cP8
Lattice constant	a = 0.44827(1) nm
Formula units (Z)	4

Hazards
Flash point	Non-flammable

Related compounds
Other anions	Iron germanide
Other cations	Cobalt silicide Manganese silicide
- Except where otherwise noted, data are given for materials in their standard state (at 25 °C [77 °F], 100 kPa). (what is ?) Infobox references

Iron monosilicide (FeSi) is an intermetallic compound, a silicide of iron that occurs in nature as the rare mineral naquite. It is a narrow-bandgap semiconductor with a room-temperature electrical resistivity of around 10 kΩ·cm and unusual magnetic properties at low temperatures. FeSi has a cubic crystal lattice with no inversion center; therefore its magnetic structure is helical, with right-hand and left-handed chiralities.

In 1948 Linus Pauling investigated the nature of the bonds in iron monosilicide.

== Structure ==
The structure is the prototype of the "iron monosilicide structure type", of space group P2_{1}3 (no. 198). It is similar to the structure of sodium chloride, with four iron atoms and four silicon atoms in each unit cell. Whereas in sodium chloride the eight atoms are at the corners of a cube and each ion is surrounded by six counterions, in iron monosilicide the atoms are all displaced parallel to body diagonals (along threefold axes) from the positions of sodium and chloride. The crystal loses all indirect (chirality reversing) symmetry elements, all fourfold and twofold rotation axes, and many of the threefold axes and translations, but retains some of the twofold screw axes and threefold axes of the sodium chloride crystal structure. As an atom is moved from (0,0,0) to (x,x,x), the other three atoms of the same kind move as well, creating a chiral arrangement except when x is a multiple of 1/4. The atoms of the other kind are displaced as well, with one of the four at (y,y,y). If x = −y = ±(√5 – 1)/8 ≈ ±0.1545 then each ion will be equidistant from seven atoms of the other kind, at a distance of ((√5 − 1)√3)/4 ≈ 0.53523, rather than six at a distance of 1/2 and one at a distance of √3/2 in the sodium chloride structure.

In the case of iron monosilicide, x = 0.13652 and y = 0.8424 (or −0.1576), or x = −0.13652 and y = 0.1576, so the seven silicon atoms around an iron atom are not all the same distance from the iron atom. Each silicon atom sits in a similar cage of iron atoms. The cages only have threefold rotational symmetry, with three slightly different interatomic distances between the central atom and the seven surrounding atoms (to 3 atoms, 3 atoms, and 1 atom respectively). There are right-handed and left-handed threefold screw axes without there being a symmetry element taking one to the other. (Threefold screw axes also exist in sodium chloride but are related by a mirror.) This means that iron monosilicide crystals exist in two different enantiomorphs, depending on the signs of x and y.

== See also ==
- Iron disilicide
- Ferrosilicon
- Silicon steel
