= Iron(I) phosphide =

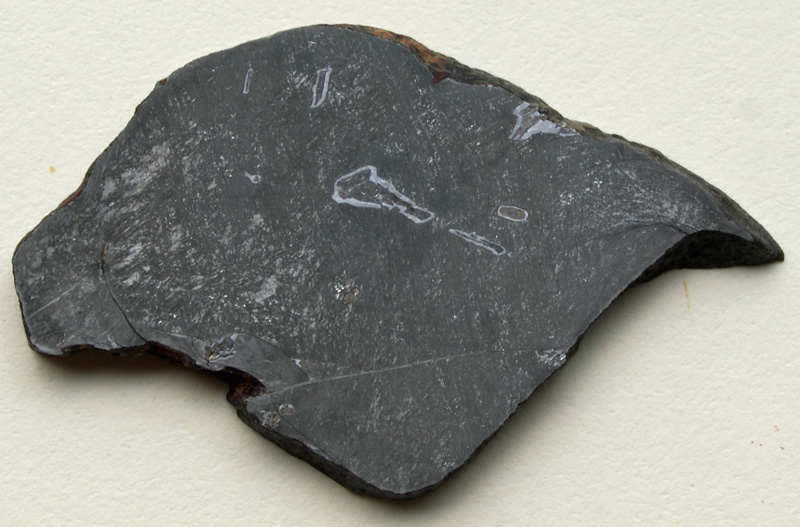

Identifiers
CAS Number	12023-53-9
3D model (JSmol)	Interactive image
ChemSpider	21884688
ECHA InfoCard	100.031.517
EC Number	234-682-8
PubChem CID	329761422
CompTox Dashboard (EPA)	DTXSID50276470
- InChI: InChI=1S/3Fe.P Key: KFSKMQQNHSLZRJ-UHFFFAOYSA-N
- SMILES: P12[Fe]3[Fe]1[Fe]23

Properties
Chemical formula	Fe_{3}P
Molar mass	204.01
Appearance	Gray to blue-gray powder
Density	6.74 g/cm^{3}
Melting point	1,370 °C (2,500 °F; 1,640 K)
Solubility in water	Insoluble

Structure
Crystal structure	tetragonal

Hazards
- GHS labelling
Pictograms	(GHS07: Exclamation mark)
Signal word	Warning
- Except where otherwise noted, data are given for materials in their standard state (at 25 °C [77 °F], 100 kPa). Infobox references

Iron(I) phosphide is an inorganic compound of iron and phosphorus with the chemical formula Fe_{3}P.

Fe_{3}P occurs naturally as a mineral called schreibersite in some meteorites. Some iron may be replaced by nickel.

== Synthesis ==
Iron(I) phosphide can be prepared by the chemical reaction of iron and phosphorus at high temperature.

3 Fe + P → Fe_{3}P

== Physical properties ==
The compound forms gray to blue-gray crystals of a tetragonal system, space group I4̅.

It is insoluble in water. Soluble in nitric acid, HF, aqua regia.

Fe_{3}P decomposes on melting.

== Chemical properties ==
Iron(I) phosphide reacts with moisture and acids to produce phosphine PH_{3}, a toxic, self-igniting gas.

== Uses ==
The compound is a semiconductor widely used in high-power and high-frequency applications, such as laser diodes.
