= Cobalt monosilicide =

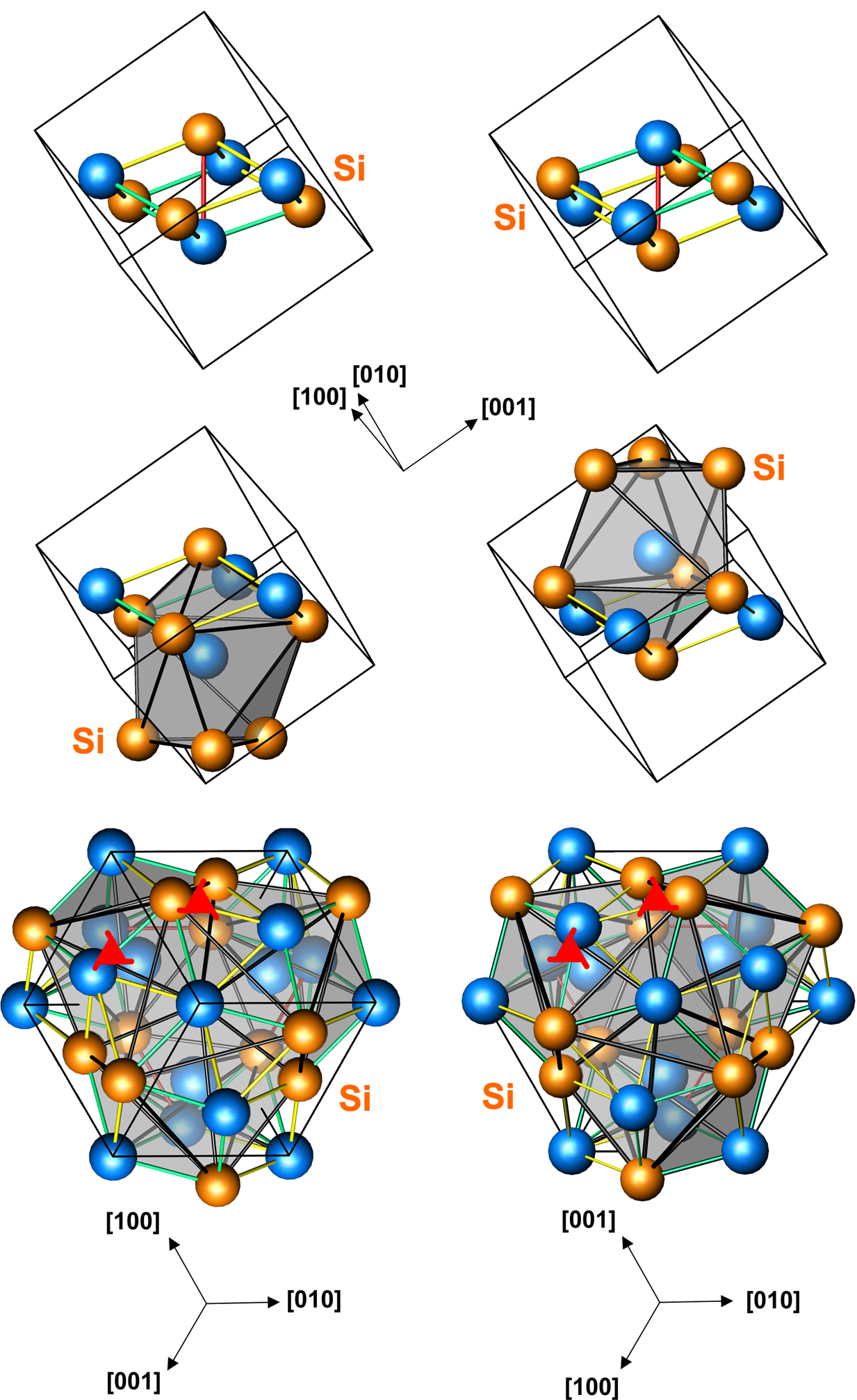
- Structures of left-handed and right-handed CoSi crystals (3 presentations, with different numbers of atoms per unit cell)

Names
- IUPAC name Cobalt silicide

Identifiers
3D model (JSmol)	Interactive image
PubChem CID	11182570
- InChI: InChI=1S/Co.Si Key: XWHPIFXRKKHEKR-UHFFFAOYSA-N
- SMILES: [Si].[Co]

Properties
Chemical formula	CoSi
Molar mass	87.018 g/mol
Density	6.3 g/cm^{3}
Melting point	1,415 °C; 2,579 °F; 1,688 K
Magnetic susceptibility (χ)	−0.44×10^{−6} emu/g
Thermal conductivity	20 W/(m·K)

Structure
Crystal structure	Cubic
Space group	P2_{1}3 (No. 198), cP8
Lattice constant	a = 0.4444(1) nm
Formula units (Z)	4

Hazards
Flash point	Non-flammable

Related compounds
Other anions	Cobalt germanide
Other cations	Iron silicide Manganese monosilicide
Related compounds	Cobalt disilicide
- Except where otherwise noted, data are given for materials in their standard state (at 25 °C [77 °F], 100 kPa). (what is ?) Infobox references

Cobalt monosilicide (CoSi) is an intermetallic compound, a silicide of cobalt. It is a diamagnetic semimetal with an electrical resistivity of around 1 mΩ·cm.
