= Scanning transmission X-ray microscopy =

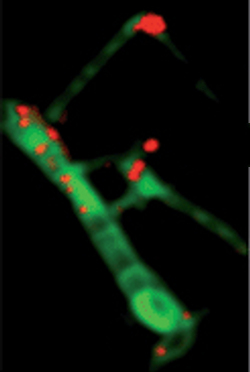
STXM image of pod-like carbon nanotube decorated with Fe nanoparticles (red).

Scanning transmission X-ray microscopy (STXM) is a type of X-ray microscopy in which a zone plate focuses an X-ray beam onto a small spot, a sample is scanned in the focal plane of the zone plate and the transmitted X-ray intensity is recorded as a function of the sample position. A stroboscopic scheme is used where the excitation is the pump and the synchrotron X-ray flashes are the probe. X-ray microscopes work by exposing a film or charged coupled device detector to detect X-rays that pass through the specimen. The image formed is of a thin section of specimen. Newer X-ray microscopes use X-ray absorption spectroscopy to heterogeneous materials at high spatial resolution. The essence of the technique is a combination of spectromicroscopy, imaging with spectral sensitivity, and microspectroscopy, recording spectra from very small spots.

== Benefits of STXM ==
=== Radiation damage ===
Electron energy loss spectroscopy (EELS) in combination with transmission electron microscopy has modest spectral resolution and is rather damaging to the sample material. STXM with variable X-ray energy gives high spectral resolution. Radiation damage effects are typically two orders of magnitude lower than for EELS. Radiation concerns are also relevant with organic materials.

=== Samples with water ===
Unlike other methods such as electron microscopy, the spectra samples with water and carbon can be obtained. STXM run at atmospheric pressure allows for convenient sample installation and fewer restrictions on sample preparation. Cells have even been built which can examine hydrated precipitates and solutions.

== Operation ==
In order to obtain spectromicroscopy data the following operating procedure is followed. The desired monochromator grating is selected along with photon energy in the middle of NEXAFS range. Refocus mirrors are adjusted to put the beam into the microscope and steered to maximize the flux passing through the zone plate. A pinhole is placed in the photon beam upstream in a transverse position to maximize transmission. Pinhole size is determined by demagnification to the size of the diffraction limit of the zone plate lens. An undersized pinhole is often used to reduce intensity which controls radiation damage. The order sorting aperture is positioned to eliminate transmission of unfocused zero order light, which would blur the image. Then an x/y line scan is defined across an intensity variation in the image. The x/y line scans are repeated with varying focus conditions. Adsorption spectra can also be obtained with a stationary photon spot.

== Applications ==
=== Quantitative polymer analysis ===
STXM has been used to study reinforce filler particles used in molded compressed polyurethane foams in the automotive and fishing industries to achieve higher load bearing capability. Two types of polymers, copolymer styrene and acrylonitrile (SAN) and aromatic-carbamate rich poly-isocyanate poly-addition (PIPA), are chemically indistinguishable by transmission electron spectroscopy. With NEXAFS, spectra of SAN and PIPA absorb strongly at 285.0 eV associated with the phenyl groups of the aromatic filler particles and thus show the same electron spectroscopy image. Only SAN has a strong absorption at 286.7 eV due to the acrylonitrile component. NEXAFS can be a quick and reliable means to differentiate chemical species at a sub-micron spatial scale.

=== Distribution of macromolecular subcomponents of biofilm cells and matrix ===
STXM which uses near-edge X-ray absorption spectroscopy is able to be applied to fully hydrated biological molecules due to the ability of X-rays to penetrate water. Soft X-rays also provide spatial resolution better than 50 nm which is suitable for bacterial and bacterial microfilms. With this, quantitative chemical mapping at a spatial scale below 50 nm may be achieved. Soft X-rays also interact with almost all elements and allow mapping of chemical species based on bonding structure. STXM allows for study of a variety of questions regarding the nature, distribution, and role of protein, carbohydrate, lipid, and nucleic acid in biofilms, especially in the extracellular matrix. The study of these biofilms is useful for environmental remediation applications.
