= Nowotny phase =

Particular class of intermetallic phases

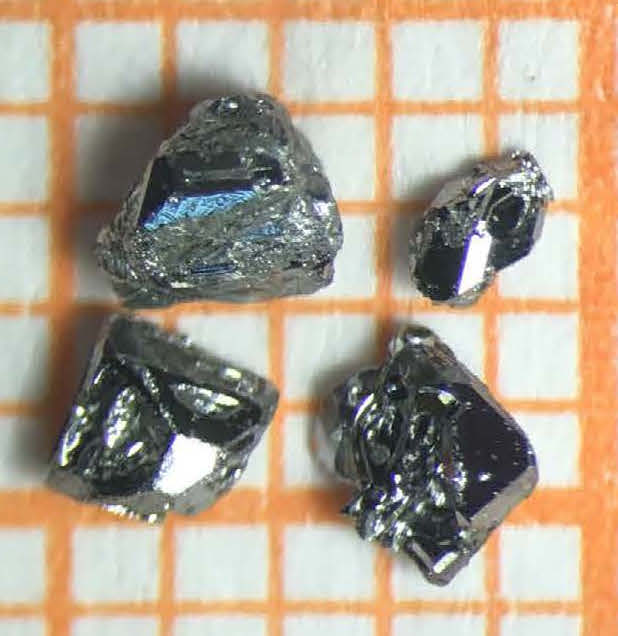
Cr_{11}Ge_{19} crystals

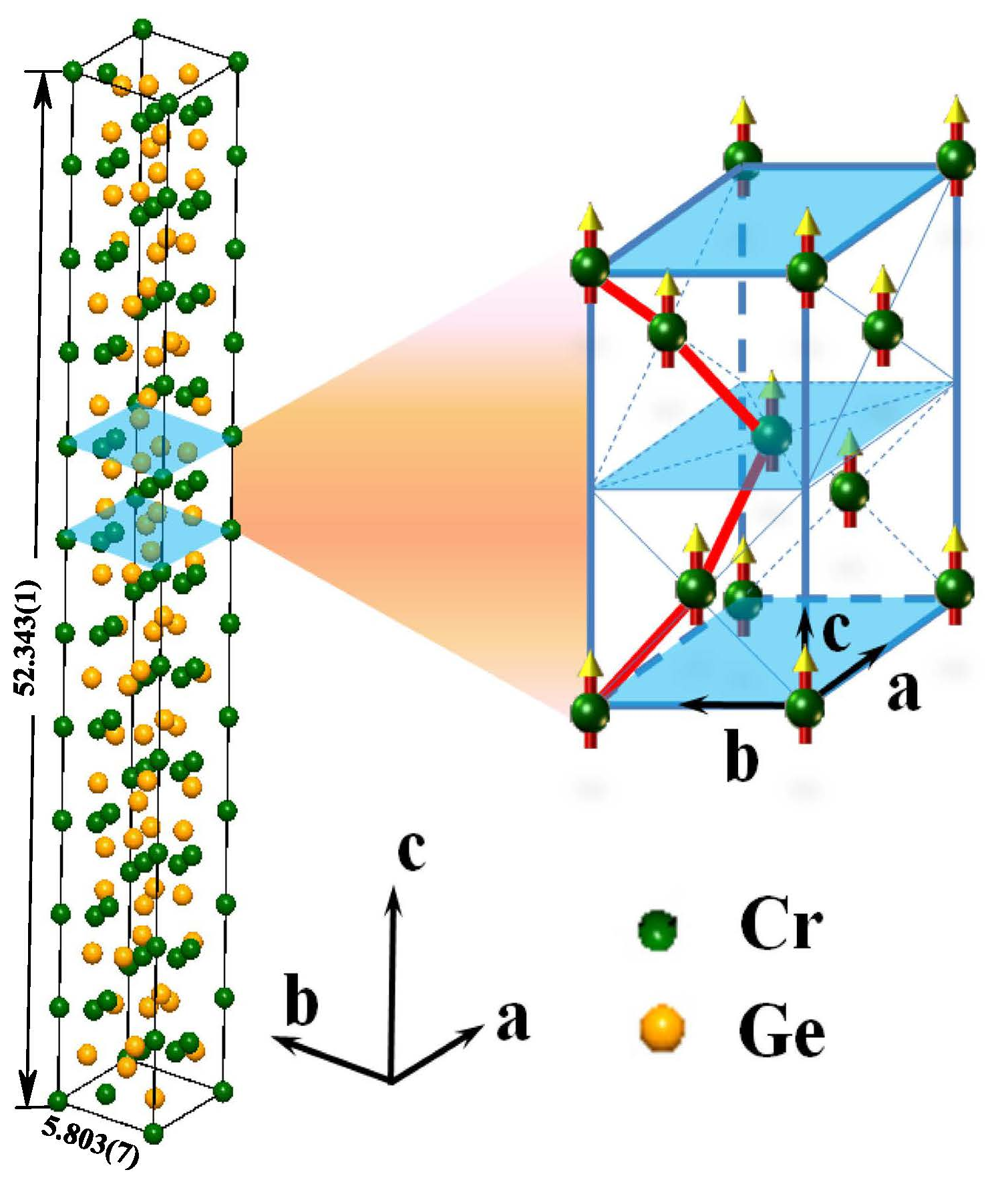
Cr_{11}Ge_{19} lattice structure

In inorganic chemistry, a Nowotny chimney ladder phase (NCL phase) is a particular intermetallic crystal structure found with certain binary compounds. NLC phases are generally tetragonal and are composed of two separate sublattices. The first is a tetragonal array of transition metal atoms, generally from group 4 through group 9 of the periodic table. Contained within this array of transition metal atoms is a second network of main group atoms, typically from group 13 (boron group) or group 14 (carbon group). The transition metal atoms form a chimney with helical zigzag chain. The main-group elements form a ladder spiraling inside the transition metal helix.

The phase is named after one of the early investigators H. Nowotny. Examples are RuGa_{2}, Mn_{4}Si_{7}, Ru_{2}Ge_{3}, Ir_{3}Ga_{5}, Ir_{4}Ge_{5} V_{17}Ge_{31}, Cr_{11}Ge_{19}, Mn_{11}Si_{19}, Mn_{15}Si_{26}, Mo_{9}Ge_{16}, Mo_{13}Ge_{23}, Rh_{10}Ga_{17}, and Rh_{17}Ge_{22}.

In RuGa_{2} the ruthenium atoms in the chimney are separated by 329 pm. The gallium atoms spiral around the Ru chimney with a Ga–Ga intrahelix distance of 257 pm. The view perpendicular to the chimney axis is that of a hexagonal lattice with gallium atoms occupying the vertices and ruthenium atoms occupying the center. Each gallium atom bonds to 5 other gallium atoms forming a distorted trigonal bipyramid. The gallium atoms carry a positive charge and the ruthenium atoms have a formal charge of −2 (filled 4d shell).

In Ru_{2}Sn_{3} the ruthenium atoms spiral around the tin inner helix. In two dimensions, the Ru atoms form a tetragonal lattice with the tin atoms appearing as triangular units in the Ru channels.

The occurrence of a LCP phase can be predicted by the so-called 14 electron rule. In it the total number of valence electrons per transition metal atom is 14.
