= Germanide =

A germanide is any binary compound of germanium and a more electropositive element. The composition of most germanides is analogous to that of the corresponding silicides and does not follow formal valence rules. The germanides of alkali and alkaline earth metals, are readily decomposed by water and acids to give germanium hydrides; most germanides of the transition metals resist the action of acids and alkalies. The main method of producing germanides is the melting or sintering of the components.

The IUPAC Red Book uses the name germide(4−) for compounds containing Ge^{4−} and instead uses the term germanide (or trihydridogermanate(1-)) for the GeH^{−}_{3} anion.

== Examples ==
- Copper germanide
- Germanide halide
