= Antisymmetric exchange =

Contribution to magnetic exchange interaction

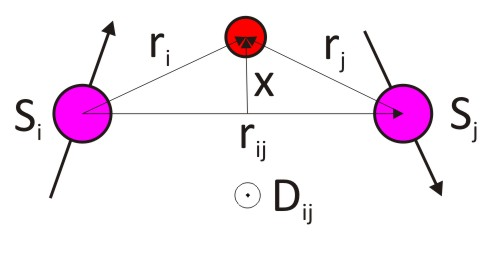
Determination of the orientation of the Dzyaloshinskii–Moriya vector from the local geometry

In physics, antisymmetric exchange, also known as the Dzyaloshinskii–Moriya interaction (DMI), is a contribution to the total magnetic exchange interaction between two neighboring magnetic spins, $\mathbf{S}_i$ and $\mathbf{S}_j$. Quantitatively, it is a term in the Hamiltonian which can be written as

$$H^{\rm (DM)}_{i,j}=\mathbf{D}_{ij} \cdot ( \mathbf{S}_i \times \mathbf{S}_j )$$.

In magnetically ordered systems, it favors a spin canting of otherwise parallel or antiparallel aligned magnetic moments and thus, is a source of weak ferromagnetic behavior in an antiferromagnet. The interaction is fundamental to the production of magnetic skyrmions and explains the magnetoelectric effects in a class of materials termed multiferroics.

== History ==
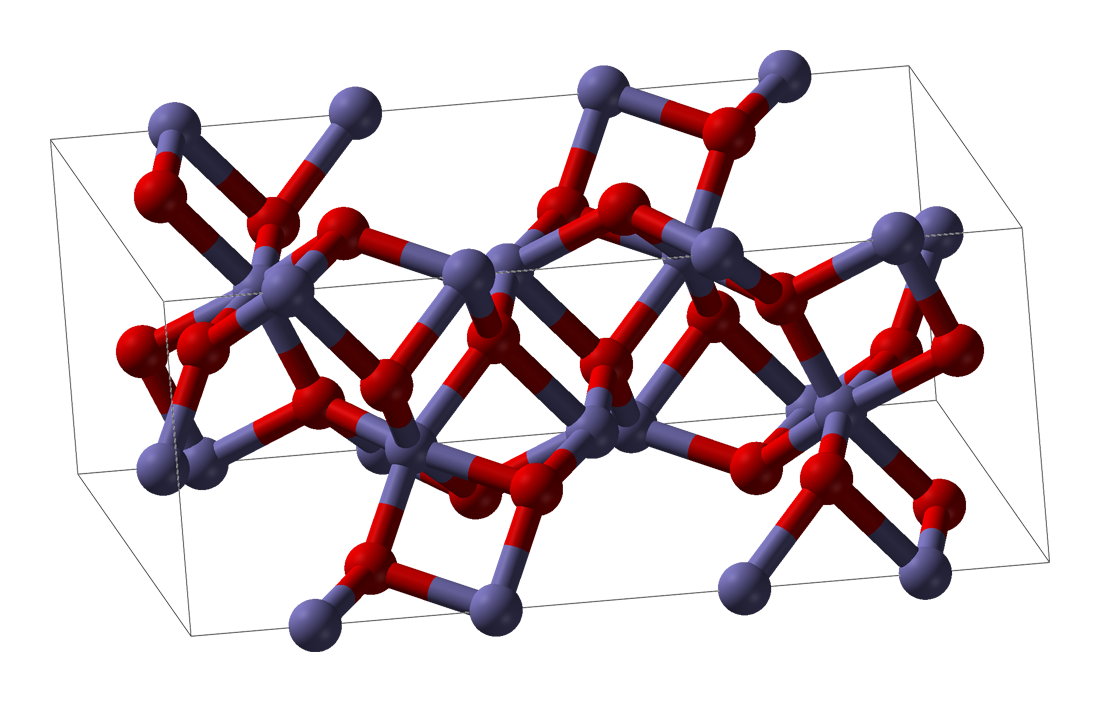
α-Fe_{2}O_{3} pictured as Haematite, the main source of iron for the steel industry

The discovery of antisymmetric exchange originated in the early 20th century from the controversial observation of weak ferromagnetism in typically antiferromagnetic α-Fe_{2}O_{3} crystals. In 1958, Igor Dzyaloshinskii provided evidence that the interaction was due to the relativistic spin lattice and magnetic dipole interactions based on Lev Landau's theory of phase transitions of the second kind.

In 1960, Toru Moriya identified the spin-orbit coupling as the microscopic mechanism of the antisymmetric exchange interaction. Moriya referred to this phenomenon specifically as the "antisymmetric part of the anisotropic superexchange interaction."

The simplified naming of this phenomenon occurred in 1962, when D. Treves and S. Alexander of Bell Telephone Laboratories simply referred to the interaction as antisymmetric exchange. Because of their seminal contributions to the field, antisymmetric exchange is sometimes referred to as the Dzyaloshinskii–Moriya interaction.

== Derivation ==
The functional form of the DMI can be obtained through a second-order perturbative analysis of the spin-orbit coupling interaction, $\hat{\mathbf{L}}\cdot\hat{\mathbf{S}}$ between ions $i, j$ in Anderson's superexchange formalism. Note the notation used implies $\hat{\mathbf{L}}_i$ is a 3-dimensional vector of angular momentum operators on ion i, and $\hat{\mathbf{S}}_i$ is a 3-dimensional spin operator of the same form:

$$\begin{align}
\delta E = \sum_m &\Biggl[ \frac{ \langle n|\lambda\hat{\mathbf{L}}_i\cdot\hat{\mathbf{S}}_i|m\rangle 2J(mn'nn')\hat{\mathbf{S}}_i\cdot\hat{\mathbf{S}}_j}{E_n-E_m}   \\
&+ \frac{2J(nn'mn')\hat{\mathbf{S}}_i\cdot\hat{\mathbf{S}}_j\langle m| \lambda\hat{\mathbf{L}}_i\cdot\hat{\mathbf{S}}_i|n\rangle}{E_n-E_m}\Biggr] \\
+\sum_{m'} &\Biggl[\frac{ \langle m'|\lambda\hat{\mathbf{L}}_j\cdot\hat{\mathbf{S}}_j|m \rangle 2J(m'nn'n)\hat{\mathbf{S}}_i\cdot\hat{\mathbf{S}}_j}{E_{n'}-E_{m'}} \\
&+ \frac{2J(n'nm'n)\hat{\mathbf{S}}_i\cdot\hat{\mathbf{S}}_j\langle m'| \lambda\hat{\mathbf{L}}_j\cdot\hat{\mathbf{S}}_j|n'\rangle}{E_{n'}-E_{m'}}\Biggr]
\end{align}$$

where $J$ is the exchange integral,

$$J(nn'mm') = \int\int \phi^*_n(\mathbf{r_1}-\mathbf{R})\phi^*_{n'}(\mathbf{r_2}-\mathbf{R'})\frac{e^2}{r_{12}}\phi_m(\mathbf{r_2}-\mathbf{R})\phi_{m'}(\mathbf{r_1}-\mathbf{R'})\mathrm{d}\mathbf{r_1}\mathrm{d}\mathbf{r_2}$$

with $\phi_n(\mathbf{r}-\mathbf{R})$ the ground orbital wavefunction of the ion at $\mathbf{R}$, etc. If the ground state is non-degenerate, then the matrix elements of $\mathbf{L}$ are purely imaginary, and we can write $\delta E$ out as

$$\begin{align}
\delta E &= 2\lambda \sum\limits_m \frac{J(nn'mn')}{E_n-E_m}\langle n| \mathbf{L_i}|m\rangle\cdot[\mathbf{S_i},(\mathbf{S_i}\cdot\mathbf{S_j})]\\
&+2\lambda \sum_{m'} \frac{J(nn'nm')}{E_{n'}-E_{m'}}\langle n'| \mathbf{L_j}|m' \rangle \cdot[\mathbf{S_j},(\mathbf{S_i}\cdot\mathbf{S_j})]\\
&= 2i\lambda\sum\limits_{m,m'}\left [\frac{J(nn'mn')}{E_{n}-E_{m}}\langle n| \mathbf{L_i}|m\rangle
- \frac{J(nn'nm')}{E_{n'}-E_{m'}}\langle n'| \mathbf{L_j}|m'\rangle \right ]\cdot[\mathbf{S_i}\times\mathbf{S_j}]\\
&=\mathbf{D}_{ij}\cdot[\mathbf{S}_i\times\mathbf{S}_j].
\end{align}$$

=== Effects of crystal symmetry ===
In an actual crystal, symmetries of neighboring ions dictate the magnitude and direction of the vector $\mathbf{D}_{ij}$. Considering the coupling of ions 1 and 2 at locations $A$ and $B$, with the point bisecting $AB$ denoted $C$, The following rules may be obtained:

1. When a center of inversion is located at $C$, $\mathbf{D}=0.$
2. When a mirror plane perpendicular to $AB$ passes through $C$, $\mathbf{D} \parallel \mathrm{mirror\ plane\ or}\ \mathbf{D}\perp AB.$
3. When there is a mirror plane including $A$ and $B$, $\mathbf{D}\perp\mathrm{mirror\ plane}.$
4. When a two-fold rotation axis perpendicular to $AB$ passes through $C$, $\mathrm{D}\perp\mathrm{two-fold\ axis}.$
5. When there is an $n$-fold axis ($n\geq 2$) along $AB$, $\mathbf{D}\parallel AB$

The orientation of the vector $\mathbf{D}_{ij}$ is constrained by symmetry, as discussed already in Moriya's original publication. Considering the case that the magnetic interaction between two neighboring ions is transferred via a single third ion (ligand) by the superexchange mechanism (see Figure), the orientation of $\mathbf{D}_{ij}$ is obtained by the simple relation $\mathbf{D}_{ij} \propto \mathbf{r}_i \times \mathbf{r}_j = \mathbf{r}_{ij} \times \mathbf{x}$. This implies that $\mathbf{D}_{ij}$ is oriented perpendicular to the triangle spanned by the involved three ions. $\mathbf{D}_{ij} = 0$ if the three ions are in line.

== Measurement ==
The Dzyaloshinskii–Moriya interaction has proven difficult to experimentally measure directly due to its typically weak effects and similarity to other magnetoelectric effects in bulk materials. Attempts to quantify the DMI vector have utilized X-ray diffraction interference, Brillouin scattering, electron spin resonance, and neutron scattering. Many of these techniques only measure either the direction or strength of the interaction and make assumptions on the symmetry or coupling of the spin interaction. A recent advancement in broadband electron spin resonance coupled with optical detection (OD-ESR) allows for characterization of the DMI vector for rare-earth ion materials with no assumptions and across a large spectrum of magnetic field strength.

== Material examples ==
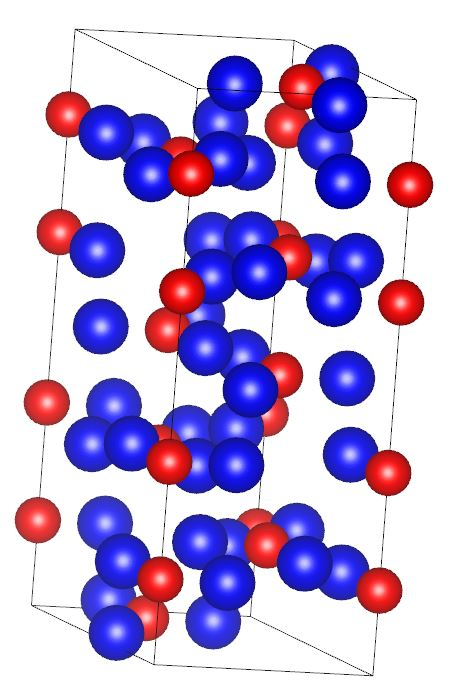
Corundum crystal structure displaying the crystal forms of α-Fe_{2}O_{3} and α-Cr_{2}O_{3} (Metal ions in red, oxygen ions in blue)

The image on the right displays a coordinated heavy metal-oxide complex that can display ferromagnetic or antiferromagnetic behavior depending on the metal ion. The structure shown is referred to as the corundum crystal structure, named after the primary form of Aluminum oxide (Al_{2}O_{3}), which displays the R3̅c trigonal space group. The structure also contains the same unit cell as α-Fe_{2}O_{3} and α-Cr_{2}O_{3} which possess D^{6}_{3d} space group symmetry. The upper half unit cell displayed shows four M^{3+} ions along the space diagonal of the rhombohedron. In the Fe_{2}O_{3} structure, the spins of the first and last metal ion are positive while the center two are negative. In the α-Cr_{2}O_{3} structure, the spins of the first and third metal ion are positive while the second and fourth are negative. Both compounds are antiferromagnetic at cold temperatures (<250K), however α-Fe_{2}O_{3} above this temperature undergoes a structural change where its total spin vector no longer points along the crystal axis but at a slight angle along the basal (111) plane. This is what causes the iron-containing compound to display an instantaneous ferromagnetic moment above 250K, while the chromium-containing compound shows no change. It is thus the combination of the distribution of ion spins, the misalignment of the total spin vector, and the resulting antisymmetry of the unit cell that gives rise to the antisymmetric exchange phenomenon seen in these crystal structures.

== Applications ==
=== Magnetic skyrmions ===
A magnetic skyrmion is a magnetic texture that occurs in the magnetization field. They exist in spiral or hedgehog configurations that are stabilized by the Dzyaloshinskii-Moriya interaction. Skyrmions are topological in nature, making them promising candidates for future spintronic devices.

=== Multiferroics ===
Antisymmetric exchange is of importance for the understanding of magnetism induced electric polarization in a recently discovered class of multiferroics. Here, small shifts of the ligand ions can be induced by magnetic ordering, because the systems tend to enhance the magnetic interaction energy at the cost of lattice energy. This mechanism is called "inverse Dzyaloshinskii–Moriya effect". In certain magnetic structures, all ligand ions are shifted into the same direction, leading to a net electric polarization.

Because of their magneto electric coupling, multiferroic materials are of interest in applications where there is a need to control magnetism through applied electric fields. Such applications include tunnel magnetoresistance (TMR) sensors, spin valves with electric field tunable functions, high-sensitivity alternating magnetic field sensors, and electrically tunable microwave devices.

Most multiferroic materials are transition metal oxides due to the magnetization potential of the 3d electrons. Many can also be classified as perovskites and contain the Fe^{3+} ion alongside a lanthanide ion. Below is an abbreviated table of common multiferroic compounds. For more examples and applications see also multiferroics.

Common multiferroic materials
Material	Ferroelectric T_{C} [K]	Magnetic T_{N} or T_{C} [K]	Type of ferroelectricity
BiFeO_{3}	1100	653	lone pair
HoMn_{2}O_{5}	39		magnetically driven
TbMnO_{3}	27	42	magnetically driven
Ni_{3}V_{2}O_{8}	6.5		
MnWO_{4}	13.5		magnetically driven
CuO	230	230	magnetically driven
ZnCr_{2}Se_{4}	110	20	

== See also ==
- Exchange interaction
- Spin–orbit coupling
- Superexchange
- Landau theory
- Skyrmions
- Multiferroics
