= Nitol =

Nitol may refer to:

- Nitol botnet - A Botnet
- Nitol Solar - A Russian company involved in Solar energy
