= Hemlock Semiconductor =

American polysilicon producer

- Industry: Polysilicon
- Founded: 1961
- Founder: Corning inc. & Shin-Etsu Handotai
- Headquarters: Hemlock, Michigan
- Key people: Arabinda Ghosh (Chairman & CEO)
- Website: https://www.hscpoly.com/

Hemlock Semiconductor (HSC) is the largest producer of hyper-pure polysilicon headquartered in the United States. Polycrystalline silicon, also called polysilicon, is a high purity, polycrystalline form of silicon, used as a raw material by the solar photovoltaic and electronics industry.

== History ==
Founded in 1961, it is owned by Corning Inc. and Shin-Etsu Handotai and named after Hemlock, Michigan, the location of its factory. Its current facilities produce between 30,000 and 35,000 tons of polycrystalline silicon, ranking it among the top five producers worldwide.

The company expanded with the Japanese joint venture partners Shin-Etsu Chemical and Mitsubishi Materials, for a new $1.2 billion plant opening near Clarksville, Tennessee. Though it officially opened in 2012, chemicals were never inventoried and no product was made. The plant was under negotiations in 2011 for a further $3 billion expansion, to keep pace with manufacturing competition from China.

In December 2014, Hemlock Semiconductor announced the permanent closure of the $1.2 billion Tennessee plant, due to adverse conditions from industry oversupply and ongoing challenges from global trade disputes. Many of the approximately fifty employees in Tennessee were offered employment positions in Michigan at the Hemlock, Michigan site or Dow Corning facilities, and the rest received severance packages.

In December 2015, Google announced that they will buy the facility, and invest more than $600 million to turn it into their 15th datacenter.

Dow Corning announced that June 1, 2016 would be "day one" such that Dow Chemical Company will assume 100% ownership of the Dow Corning Corporation, concluding the 73-year joint venture between Dow Chemical and Corning Inc. Hemlock Semiconductor continues as an independently run entity with two shareholders: Corning Inc. owns 80.5%, and Shin-Etsu Chemical owns 19.5%.

With the decline in market demand in 2017, HSC had to lay off 100 workers in Michigan in the first quarter of 2018. The company said it was also due to U.S. export tariffs imposed by China in 2014. An additional 50 layoffs were required in 2020 due to ongoing tariff issues and a result of the COVID-19 pandemic.

In 2019, HSC put $100,000 into the construction of the Hemlock Area STEM Center, which will provide kindergarten to high school students of the region with exploration possibilities in the fields of science, technology, engineering, and mathematics (STEM).

In September 2020, Hemlock announced they had acquired DuPont’s trichlorosilane (TCS) business, which includes the TCS manufacturing facility in Midland, Michigan.

The company broke ground on its $375 million Next Generation Finishing project in October 2022. The expansion project is designed to modernize HSC's polysilicon manufacturing processes and is expected to create up to 170 new jobs. With locating the new facility in Thomas Township, it received additional support from a $27 million Strategic Site Readiness Program (SSRP) grant provided by the Michigan Strategic Fund the Saginaw Township also received help for the project from the legislative to the amount of $10 million.

HSC provides the youth engineering program scholarship at Michigan Tech. 2023 marked the 13th year that it has been available for application, and 30 full scholarships were provided for the summer engineering program July 23 to 28, 2023.

== See also ==
- Dow Corning Corporation — joint venture.
- Corning Inc.
- Dow Chemical Company
- Shin-Etsu Chemical
- Official website
