= DMCS =

DMCS may refer to:

- DEC Multinational Character Set, a character set by Digital Equipment Corporation
- Des Moines Christian School, a Christian centered private school in the Des Moines, Iowa area
- Dumai-Melaka Cable System (cable system) a submarine telecommunications cable system
- Chlorodimethylsilane
- Deluxe Music Construction Set, software by Electronic Arts
- Derecho-producing mesoscale convective system, a type of severe weather complex that produces a derecho
