= Chlorosilane =

Chemical compounds containing at least one silicon-chlorine bond

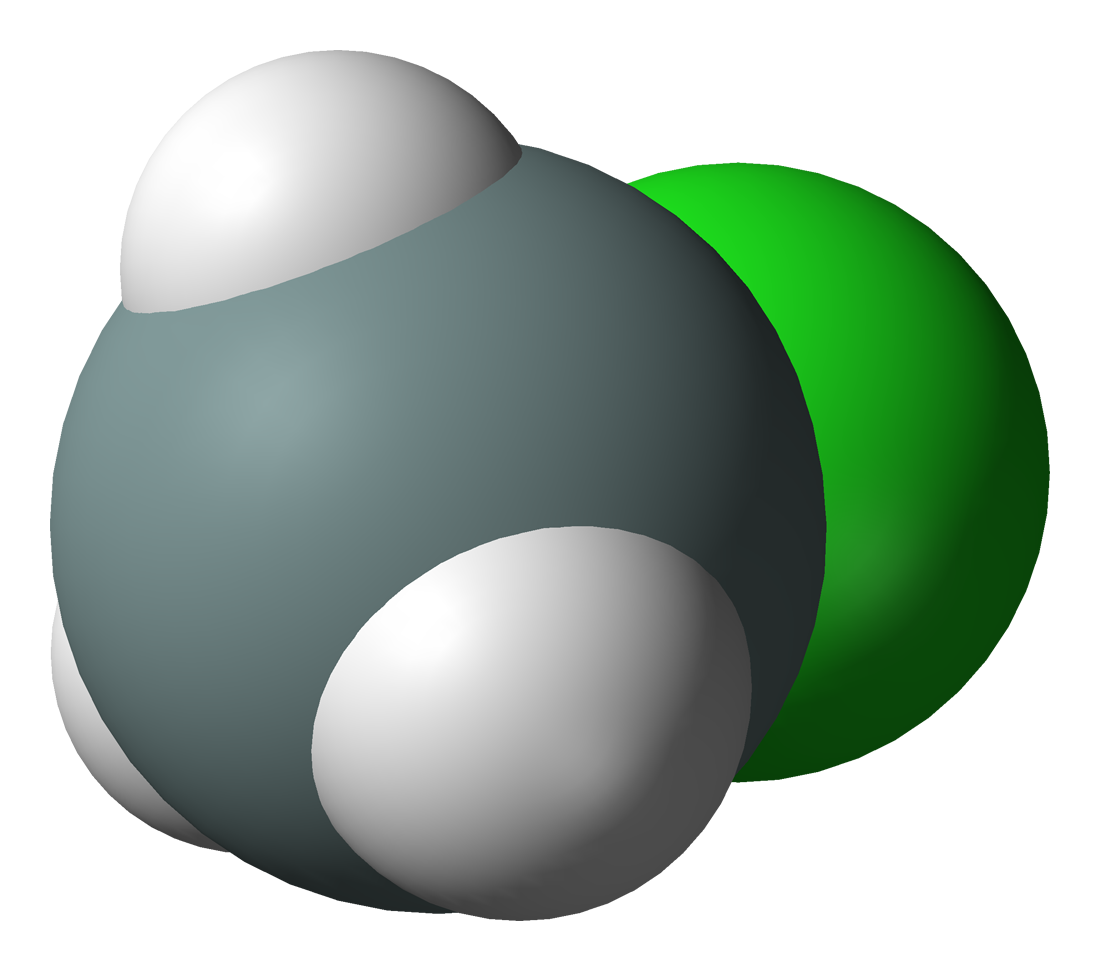
Space-filling model of the chlorosilane molecule, SiH3Cl

In inorganic chemistry, chlorosilanes are a group of reactive, chlorine-containing chemical compounds, related to silane (SiH_{4}) and used in many chemical processes. Each such chemical has at least one silicon-chlorine (Si−Cl) bond. Trichlorosilane is produced on the largest scale. The parent chlorosilane is silicon tetrachloride (SiCl_{4}).

== Synthesis ==
=== Hydrochlorosilanes ===
These include chlorosilane (H_{3}SiCl), dichlorosilane (H_{2}SiCl_{2}), and, most importantly trichlorosilane (HSiCl_{3}). The idealized equation for the production of trichlorosilane is:

2 Si + 6 HCl → 2 HSiCl_{3} + 2 H_{2}

=== Methylchlorosilanes ===
Methyltrichlorosilane (CH_{3}SiCl_{3}), dimethyldichlorosilane ((CH_{3})_{2}SiCl_{2}), and trimethylsilyl chloride ((CH_{3})_{3}SiCl) are produced by the Direct Process, the reaction of methyl chloride with a silicon-copper alloy. Each of these three methylchlorosilanes are common reagents in organosilicon chemistry.

== Reactions ==
The methylchlorosilanes react with water to produce hydrogen chloride, giving siloxanes. In the case of trimethylsilyl chloride, the hydrolyzed product is hexamethyldisiloxane:

2 ((CH_{3})_{3}SiCl + H_{2}O → [(CH_{3})_{3}Si]_{2}O + 2 HCl

The analogous reaction of dimethyldichlorosilane gives siloxane polymers or rings:

n (CH_{3})_{2}SiCl_{2} + n H_{2}O → [(CH_{3})_{2}SiO]_{n} + 2n HCl

Many compounds containing Si-Cl bonds can be converted to hydrides using lithium aluminium hydride, This kind of conversion was demonstrated for the preparation of silane:

SiCl_{4} + LiAlH_{4} → SiH_{4} + AlCl_{3} + LiCl

== Use ==
Silicon tetrachloride and trichlorosilane are intermediates in the production of ultrapure silicon in the semiconductor industry. Chlorosilanes obtained from crude silicon are purified by fractional distillation techniques and then reduced with hydrogen to give silicon of 99.999999999% purity.

Organic chlorosilanes are frequently used as coatings for silicon and glass surfaces, and in the production of silicone (polysiloxane) polymers. While phenyl chlorosilanes and many others can be used, methylsiloxanes are produced in the greatest quantities.

Methyl chlorosilanes have one to three methyl groups. In the case of dimethyldichlorosilane, two chlorine atoms are available, so that a reaction with excess water produces a linear chain of ether-like linkages between silicon atoms. As in polyethers, these flexible linkages produce a rubbery polymer, polydimethylsiloxane (PDMS). Methyltrichlorosilane can be used to induce branching and cross-linking in PDMS molecules, while chlorotrimethylsilane serves to end backbone chains, limiting molecular weight.

Other acid-forming species, especially acetate, can replace chlorine in silicone synthesis with little difference in the chemistry of the finished polymer. These analogues of chlorosilanes are quite common in the sealants and adhesives marketed to consumers, and as precursors for medical-grade silicone, because of reduced toxicity.
