= Go-To Transport =

American freight service provider

Go-To Transport, Inc.
- Industry: Trucking, Logistics, Freight Brokering
- Founded: 2003
- Founder: Gary Short and Allison Short
- Headquarters: Bay City, Michigan
- Number of employees: 120
- Website: www.gototransport.com

Go-To Transport, Inc. based in Bay City, Michigan, is an American provider of freight services.

== Corporate history ==
Go-To Transport, Inc. was formed in 2003 by siblings, Gary and Allison Short. It is based in Bay City, Michigan, located near the Saginaw Bay, on Michigan's east side. Go-To Transport, Inc. offers full truckload transportation services - including Dedicated, Expedited and Intermodal - within the 48 contiguous United States and Canada. Other services include freight-forwarding, brokering, and warehousing and distribution. The company employs drivers throughout the country and has two terminals in the Midwest. Major customers include Dow Chemical, Dow Corning, BP, Ford, The Home Depot, Procter & Gamble, SC Johnson, BorgWarner, GMCCA and Anheuser-Busch.

In 2005, Go-To Transport, Inc. spun off a stand-alone technology company, TransIT Solutions. This entity specializes in creating customizable software for logistics and transportation management.

In 2012, Go-To Transport, Inc. spun off a stand-alone logistics company, Go-To Solutions.

== Locations ==
Go-To Transport is based in Bay City, Michigan and has a remote offices in Green Bay, Wisconsin and Romulus, Michigan.
