= Daqo New Energy =

Chinese company

Daqo New Energy Corp.
- Native name: 大全新能源
- Type: Public
- Traded as: NYSE: DQ
- Industry: photovoltaics, materials
- Founded: 2007; 19 years ago
- Headquarters: Wanzhou, Chongqing, China; Cayman Islands
- Key people: Guangfu Xu (Chairman); Longgen Zhang (CEO)
- Products: polysilicon, silicon wafers
- Website: www.dqsolar.com

Daqo New Energy Corp. is a Chinese company engaged in the manufacture of monocrystalline silicon (mono-Si) and polysilicon (poly-Si), primarily for use in solar photovoltaic systems. The company operates a mono-Si and poly-Si manufacturing facility located in Shihezi, Xinjiang Province, China. Daqo formerly manufactured silicon wafers at a facility in Chongqing, China (discontinued in 2018) and photovoltaic modules at a facility in Nanjing, China (discontinued in 2012).

The company is reportedly tied to the use of forced labor in Xinjiang.

== Corporate structure ==
Daqo New Energy Corp. was incorporated in the Cayman Islands as Mega Stand International Limited in November 2007, adopting a variable interest entity (VIE) structure. The company changed its corporate name to Daqo New Energy Corp. in August 2009. Daqo New Energy Corp. operates through a number of subsidiaries underneath the parent company, Daqo Cayman. These are:

- Chongqing Daqo, established January 2008, handled manufacturing activities at Daqo's Chongqing facility
- Xinjiang Daqo, established February 2011, handles manufacturing activities at Daqo's Xinjiang facility

=== Listings ===
Daqo New Energy Corp. was first listed on the New York Stock Exchange in October 2010, and Xinjiang Daqo was listed on China's New Third Board (China's OTC market) in 2016.

== Operations ==
=== Monocrystalline and polycrystalline silicon production ===
Daqo produces its mono-Si and poly-Si using a chemical vapor deposition process in closed-loop reactors.

From its inception through 2012, Daqo's silicon manufacturing was performed in its Chongqing facility. The Chongqing facility ended its production of silicon in December 2012, while the Xinjiang facility began production of silicon in Q2 2013. Some of the equipment from the Chongqing facility has been relocated from Chongqing to Xinjiang.

The Xinjiang facility has been expanded several times, increasing its annual silicon production capacity. As of 2018, an expansion (Phase 3B) is currently underway, which will bring the facility's annual production capacity to 30,000 MT.

Xinjiang Facility Expansion Projects
Project	Completion Date	Silicon Production Capacity
Phase 2A	2013	5,000 MT/year
Phase 2A enhancement	2014	6,150 MT/year
Phase 2B	2nd half of 2015	12,150 MT/year
Phase 3A	Q1 2017	18,000 MT/year
Phase 3B	June 2019	35,000 MT/year
Phase 4A	Q1 2020 (estimated)	70,000 MT/year
Phase 4B	Q1 2022	105,000 MT/year

In Q1 2018, 60% of Daqo's production consisted of monocrystalline silicon and 40% consisted of polycrystalline silicon. Expansions 3B, 4A, and 4B will produce exclusively monocrystalline silicon.

=== Silicon wafer production ===
Daqo's Chongqing facility began production of silicon wafers in 2011. In 2017, the company sold 98 million pieces, up from 82.8 million pieces in 2016. Daqo used silicon from its Xinjiang facility to create its wafers, an example of vertical integration.

Daqo discontinued its wafer manufacturing operations in September 2018 in response to "increasingly challenging market conditions."

=== Photovoltaic module production ===
Daqo formerly produced photovoltaic modules at a facility in Nanjing. Daqo sold this business in 2012.

== U.S. sanctions ==
Daqo is allegedly tied to the use of forced labor in Xinjiang. In May 2021, Daqo shortlisted three auditors to assess its operations in an attempt to refute the allegations. In June 2021, the United States Department of Commerce placed a subsidiary of Daqo, Xinjiang Daqo New Energy Co., on the Bureau of Industry and Security's Entity List.
