= Silicon tetrachloride (data page) =

Chemical data page

This page provides supplementary chemical data on silicon tetrachloride.

== Material Safety Data Sheet ==
The handling of this chemical may incur notable safety precautions. It is highly recommend that you seek the Material Safety Datasheet (MSDS) for this chemical from a reliable source, it this case, noting that one should "avoid all contact! In all cases consult a doctor! ... inhalation causes sore throat and Burning sensation".

== Structure and properties ==
Structure and properties
Index of refraction, n_{D}	1.41156 at 25 °C
Abbe number	?
Dielectric constant, ε_{r}	2.248 ε_{0} at 0 °C
Bond strength	381 kJ/mol (Si-Cl)
Bond length	?
Bond angle	109° (Cl-Si-Cl)
Dipole#Molecular dipoles	0 D
Magnetic susceptibility	−87.5
Viscosity	99.4 mPa.s at 25 °C; 96.2 mPa.s at 50 °C
Thermal conductivity	0.099 W/(m K) at 25 °C; 0.096 W/(m K) at 50 °C

== Thermodynamic properties ==
Phase behavior
Triple point	? K (? °C), ? Pa
Critical point	508.1 K (235.0 °C), 3.593 MPa, 0.326vdm^{3}/mol
Std enthalpy change of fusion, Δ_{fus}H^{~~o~~}	7.60 kJ/mol
Std entropy change of fusion, Δ_{fus}S^{~~o~~}	? J/(mol·K)
Std enthalpy change of vaporization, Δ_{vap}H^{~~o~~}	28.7 kJ/mol
Std entropy change of vaporization, Δ_{vap}S^{~~o~~}	? J/(mol·K)
Solid properties
Std enthalpy change of formation, Δ_{f}H^{~~o~~}_{solid}	? kJ/mol
Standard molar entropy, S^{~~o~~}_{solid}	? J/(mol K)
Heat capacity, c_{p}	? J/(mol K)
Liquid properties
Std enthalpy change of formation, Δ_{f}H^{~~o~~}_{liquid}	−687.0 kJ/mol
Std Gibbs free energy of formation, Δ_{f}G^{~~o~~}_{liquid}	−619.8 kJ/mol
Standard molar entropy, S^{~~o~~}_{liquid}	239.7 J/(mol K)
Heat capacity, c_{p}	145. J/(mol K)
Gas properties
Std enthalpy change of formation, Δ_{f}H^{~~o~~}_{gas}	−657. kJ/mol
Std Gibbs free energy of formation, Δ_{f}G^{~~o~~}_{gas}	−617.0 kJ/mol
Standard molar entropy, S^{~~o~~}_{gas}	330.7 J/(mol K)
Heat capacity, c_{p}	90. J/(mol K)

== Spectral data ==
UV-Vis
λ_{max}	? nm
Extinction coefficient, ε	?
IR
Major absorption bands	610, 642 cm^{−1}
NMR
Proton NMR
Carbon-13 NMR
Other NMR data
MS
Masses of main fragments	133, 135, 170

This box:
- Except where noted otherwise, data relate to Standard temperature and pressure.
- Reliability of data general note.
