= Silicon tetrachloride =

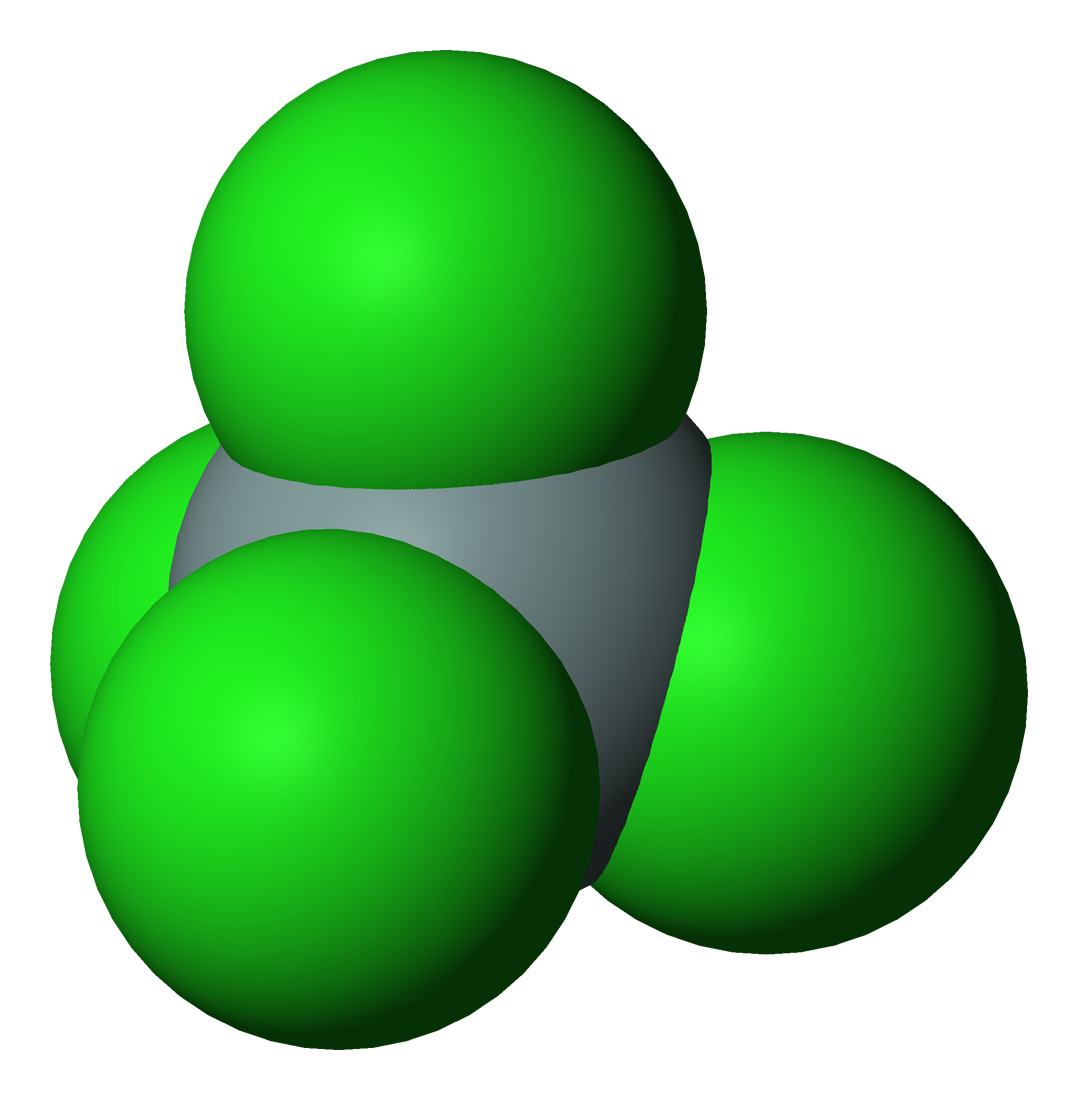

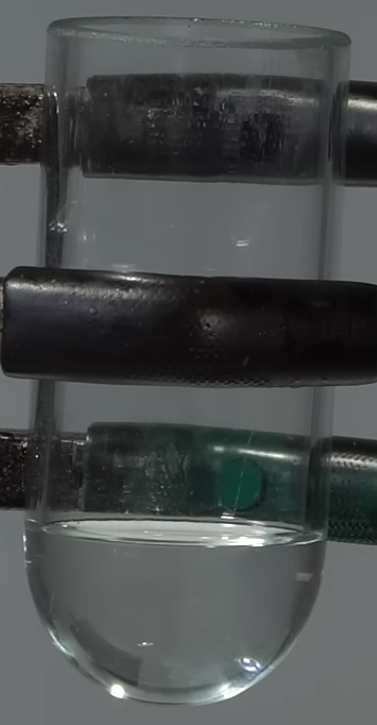

Names
- IUPAC name Tetrachlorosilane
- Other names Silicon tetrachloride Tetrachlorosilane

Identifiers
CAS Number	10026-04-7
3D model (JSmol)	Interactive image
ChemSpider	23201
ECHA InfoCard	100.030.037
EC Number	233-054-0
PubChem CID	24816
RTECS number	VW0525000
UNII	96L75U0BM3
UN number	1818
CompTox Dashboard (EPA)	DTXSID0029711
- InChI: InChI=1S/Cl4Si/c1-5(2,3)4 Key: FDNAPBUWERUEDA-UHFFFAOYSA-N; InChI=1/Cl4Si/c1-5(2,3)4
- SMILES: [Si](Cl)(Cl)(Cl)Cl

Properties
Chemical formula	SiCl_{4}
Molar mass	169.90 g/mol
Appearance	Colourless liquid
Density	1.483 g/cm^{3}
Melting point	−68.74 °C (−91.73 °F; 204.41 K)
Boiling point	57.65 °C (135.77 °F; 330.80 K)
Solubility in water	Reacts to form silica
Solubility	soluble in benzene, toluene, chloroform, ether
Vapor pressure	25.9 kPa at 20 °C
Magnetic susceptibility (χ)	−88.3·10^{−6} cm^{3}/mol

Structure
Crystal structure	Tetrahedral
Coordination geometry	4

Thermochemistry
Std molar entropy (S^{⦵}_{298})	240 J·mol^{−1}·K^{−1}
Std enthalpy of formation (Δ_{f}H^{⦵}_{298})	−687 kJ·mol^{−1}

Hazards
- GHS labelling
Pictograms	(GHS07: Exclamation mark)
Signal word	Warning
Hazard statements	H315, H319, H335
Precautionary statements	P261, P264, P271, P280, P302+P352, P304+P340, P305+P351+P338, P312, P321, P332+P313, P337+P313, P362, P403+P233, P405, P501
NFPA 704 (fire diamond)	3 0 2 W
Safety data sheet (SDS)	ICSC 0574 MSDS

Related compounds
Other anions	Silicon tetrafluoride Silicon tetrabromide Silicon tetraiodide
Other cations	Carbon tetrachloride Germanium tetrachloride Tin(IV) chloride Titanium tetrachloride
Related chlorosilanes	Chlorosilane; Dichlorosilane; Trichlorosilane

Supplementary data page
- Silicon tetrachloride (data page)
- Except where otherwise noted, data are given for materials in their standard state (at 25 °C [77 °F], 100 kPa). verify (what is ?) Infobox references

Silicon tetrachloride or tetrachlorosilane is the inorganic compound with the formula SiCl_{4}. It is a colorless volatile liquid that fumes in air. It is used to produce high-purity silicon and silica for commercial applications. It is a part of the chlorosilane family.

== Preparation ==
Silicon tetrachloride is prepared by the chlorination of various silicon compounds such as ferrosilicon, silicon carbide, or mixtures of silicon dioxide and carbon. The ferrosilicon route is most common.

In the laboratory, SiCl_{4} can be prepared by treating silicon with chlorine at 600 °C (1,112 °F):

Si + 2 Cl_{2} → SiCl_{4}

It was first prepared by Jöns Jakob Berzelius in 1823.

Brine can be contaminated with silica when the production of chlorine is a byproduct of a metal refining process from metal chloride ore. In rare occurrences, the silicon dioxide in silica is converted to silicon tetrachloride when the contaminated brine is electrolyzed.

== Reactions ==
=== Hydrolysis and related reactions ===
Like other chlorosilanes or silanes, silicon tetrachloride reacts readily with water:

SiCl_{4} + 2 H_{2}O → SiO_{2} + 4 HCl

The reaction can be noticed on exposure of the liquid to air, as SiCl_{4} vapour produces fumes as it reacts with moisture to give a cloud-like aerosol of silica and hydrochloric acid. In contrast, carbon tetrachloride is not readily hydrolyzed.

With alcohols it reacts to give orthosilicate esters:

SiCl_{4} + 4 ROH → Si(OR)_{4} + 4 HCl

=== Polysilicon chlorides ===
At higher temperatures homologues of silicon tetrachloride can be prepared by the reaction:

Si + 2 SiCl_{4} → Si_{3}Cl_{8}

In fact, the chlorination of silicon is accompanied by the formation of hexachlorodisilane Si_{2}Cl_{6}. A series of compounds containing up to six silicon atoms in the chain can be separated from the mixture using fractional distillation.

=== Reactions with other nucleophiles ===
Silicon tetrachloride is a classic electrophile in its reactivity. It forms a variety of organosilicon compounds upon treatment with Grignard reagents and organolithium compounds:

4 RLi + SiCl_{4} → R_{4}Si + 4 LiCl

Reduction with hydride reagents affords silane.

== Comparison with other SiX_{4} compounds ==
	SiH_{4}	SiF_{4}	SiCl_{4}	SiBr_{4}	SiI_{4}
b.p. (˚C)	−111.9	−90.3	56.8	155.0	290.0
m.p. (˚C)	−185	−95.0	−68.8	5.0	155.0
Si-X bond length (Å)	>0.74	1.55	2.02	2.20	2.43
Si-X bond energy (kJ/mol)	384	582	391	310	234

== Uses ==
Silicon tetrachloride is used as an intermediate in the manufacture of polysilicon, a hyper-pure form of silicon, since it has a boiling point convenient for purification by repeated fractional distillation. It is reduced to trichlorosilane (HSiCl_{3}) by hydrogen gas in a hydrogenation reactor, and either directly used in the Siemens process or further reduced to silane (SiH_{4}) and injected into a fluidized bed reactor. Silicon tetrachloride reappears in both these two processes as a by-product and is recycled in the hydrogenation reactor. Vapor phase epitaxy of reducing silicon tetrachloride with hydrogen at approximately 1250 °C was done:

SiCl_{4}(g) + 2 H_{2}(g) → Si(s) + 4 HCl(g) at 1250°C

The produced polysilicon is used as wafers in large amounts by the photovoltaic industry for conventional solar cells made of crystalline silicon and also by the semiconductor industry.

Silicon tetrachloride can also be hydrolysed to fumed silica. High-purity silicon tetrachloride is used in the manufacture of optical fibres. This grade should be free of hydrogen containing impurities like trichlorosilane. Optical fibres are made using processes like MCVD and OFD where silicon tetrachloride is oxidized to pure silica in the presence of oxygen.

As a feedstock in production of fused silica.

== Safety and environmental issues ==
Pollution from the production of silicon tetrachloride has been reported in China associated with the increased demand for photovoltaic cells that has been stimulated by subsidy programs.

== See also ==
- Silicon tetrachloride (data page)
