= Nitol Solar =

Nitol Solar Group
- Native name: ООО «Группа Нитол»
- Company type: Ltd
- Industry: [[Semiconductor industry|Semicondutor]], chemical
- Founded: 1998
- Defunct: September 12, 2019
- Fate: Bankruptcy. Allegedly due to a sharp decrease of prices on polysilicon on the world market that fell in 2008-2009 from ~$400USD to less than $40
- Headquarters: Russia
- Key people: Dmitry Semyonov
- Products: Polycrystalline silicon, chlorine
- Parent: ООО «Нитол-Силикон» (Russia), INSQU PRODUCTION LIMITED (Cyprus)
- Subsidiaries: ООО «Усолье-Сибирский силикон», ООО «Усольехимпром»
- Website: nitol.ru

Nitol Solar Group Ltd. was a vertically integrated company group based in Usolye-Sibirskoye, Russia. The company had two plants and was intended to produce solar-grade polycrystalline silicon from trichlorsilane by Siemens-process for solar energy applications. The company stopped all activities in 2012, fired all employees, went bankrupt, and closed in 2019. The company's facilities were being dismantled in 2022.

In 2008 the company was funded by International Finance Corporation (IFC), CHINA Suntech Power Inc, later getting joined by Sberbank and Rosnano (with surety by Alfa-Bank) in 2009.

NITOL group also included Usolikhimprom (Russian: Усольхимпром) company that was shut down and dissolved on November 1, 2017 due to bankruptcy as well. The company was labeled as a «second Chernobyl» due to chemical contamination of plant by mercury and others dangerous raw chemical compounds that were left unmanaged.

== Overview ==
They were valued at $1bn in Jan 2008 The company was founded in 1998 by Dimitry Kontenko, and in 2009, was Russia's largest producer of polysilicon.

Nitol’s current and envisaged product groups include the value chain from trichlorosilane to polycrystalline silicon and monocrystalline and multicrystalline silicon wafers.

Nitol Solar production activity is based on two divisions – the Chemical Division and the Polysilicon Division. The divisions are integrated into a single value chain.

The Chemical Division manufactures chlorine, caustic soda, a number of chlorine-containing organic and inorganic products and processes gas for the production of trichlorosilane (raw material for polysilicon production).

The Polysilicon Division is focussed on the manufacture of the primary raw material for photovoltaic wafers.

In 2011, the company was involved in a project funded by Rusnano and Sberbank to establish a polysilicone plant in Irkutsk, the project folded with all workers laid off after the price of polysilicone fell from $400 to $16/kg.

In 2012 company stopped production of polycrystalline silicon. In 2019 it was completely bankrupt.

== Legacy ==
The company has left a huge mercury-containing sludge that heavily contaminated nearby rivers and lands by mercury metal. Because of that it's often referred as a «second Chernobyl».
