= Dichlorosilane =

- Stereo, skeletal formula of dichlorosilane with some explicit hydrogens added

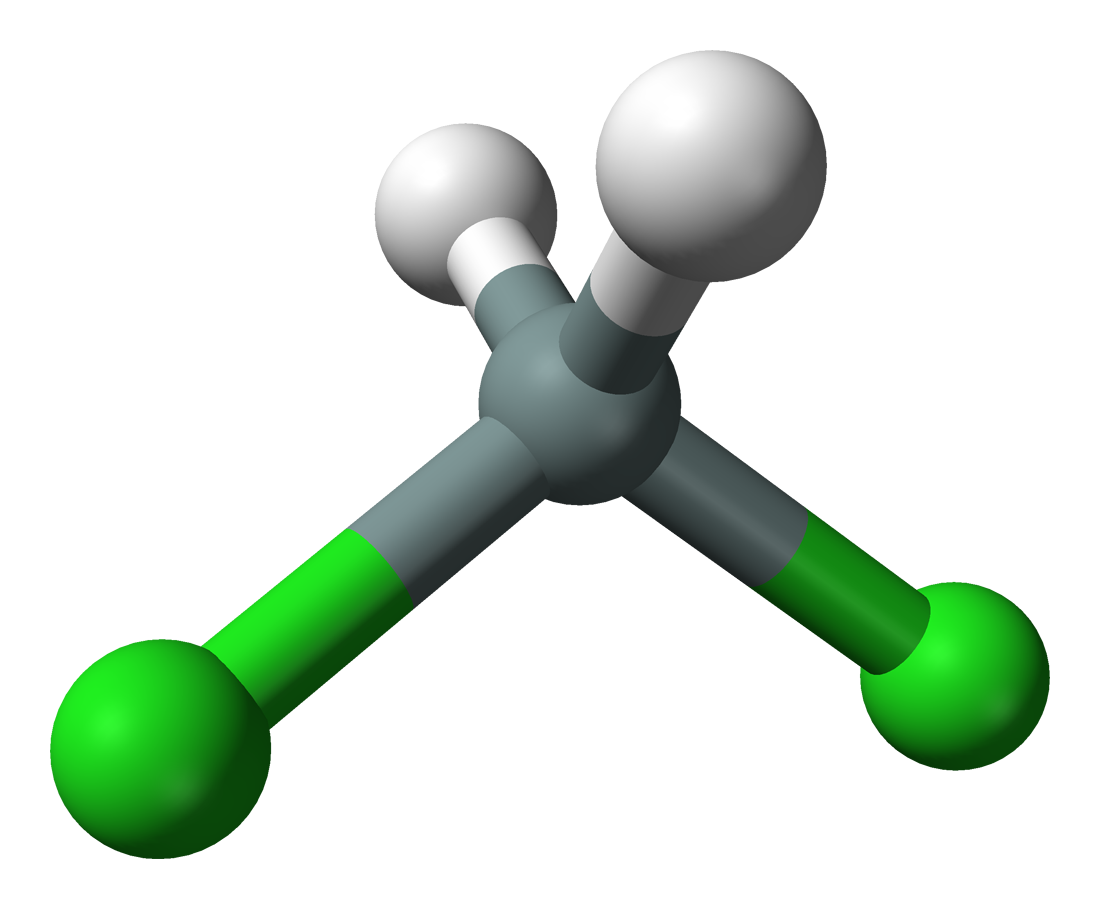
Ball and stick model of dichlorosilane
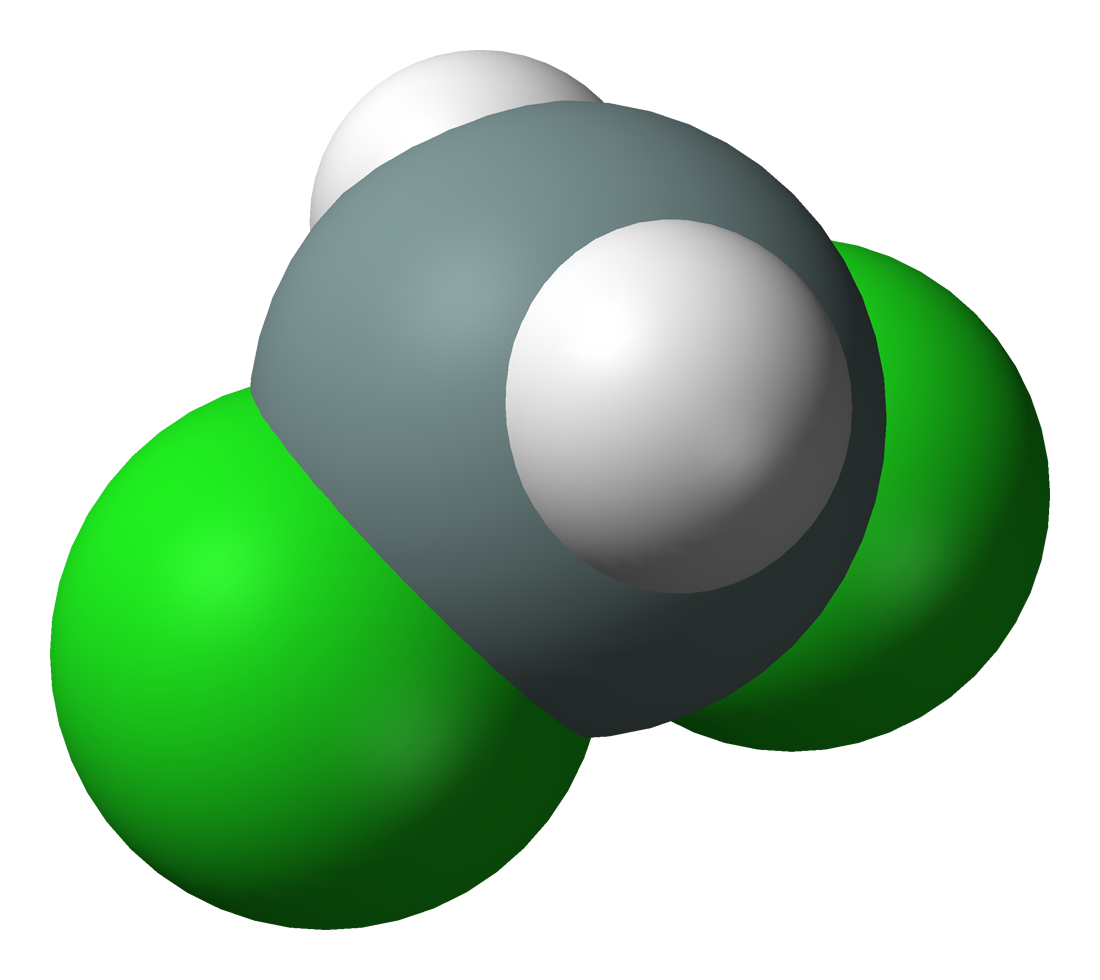
Spacefill model of dichlorosilane

Names
- IUPAC name Dichlorosilane
- Other names Silylene dichloride

Identifiers
CAS Number	4109-96-0
3D model (JSmol)	Interactive image
Abbreviations	DCS
ChemSpider	55266
ECHA InfoCard	100.021.717
EC Number	223-888-3
MeSH	dichlorosilane
PubChem CID	61330
RTECS number	VV3050000
UNII	WFA4RBW3D3
UN number	2189
CompTox Dashboard (EPA)	DTXSID1052082
- InChI: InChI=1S/Cl2H2Si/c1-3-2/h3H2 Key: MROCJMGDEKINLD-UHFFFAOYSA-N
- SMILES: Cl[SiH2]Cl

Properties
Chemical formula	SiH_{2}Cl_{2}
Molar mass	101.007 g mol^{−1}
Appearance	Colourless gas
Density	4.228 g cm^{−3}
Melting point	−122 °C (−188 °F; 151 K)
Boiling point	8 °C; 46 °F; 281 K at 101 kPa
Solubility in water	Reacts
Vapor pressure	167.2 kPa (at 20 °C)

Thermochemistry
Std molar entropy (S^{⦵}_{298})	286.72 J K^{−1} mol^{−1}
Std enthalpy of formation (Δ_{f}H^{⦵}_{298})	−320.49 kJ mol^{−1}

Hazards
- GHS labelling
Pictograms	(GHS02: Flammable) (GHS05: Corrosive) (GHS06: Toxic)
Signal word	Danger
Hazard statements	H220, H250, H314, H330
Precautionary statements	P210, P261, P305+P351+P338, P310, P410+P403
NFPA 704 (fire diamond)	4 4 2 W
Flash point	−37 °C (−35 °F; 236 K)
Autoignition temperature	55 °C (131 °F; 328 K)
Explosive limits	4.1–99%
Safety data sheet (SDS)	inchem.org

Related compounds
Related chlorosilanes	Monochlorosilane; Trichlorosilane Silicon tetrachloride
Related compounds	Dichloromethane
- Except where otherwise noted, data are given for materials in their standard state (at 25 °C [77 °F], 100 kPa). verify (what is ?) Infobox references

Dichlorosilane, or DCS as it is commonly known, is a chemical compound with the formula H_{2}SiCl_{2}. In its major use, it is mixed with ammonia (NH_{3}) in LPCVD chambers to grow silicon nitride in semiconductor processing. A higher concentration of DCS·NH_{3} (i.e. 16:1), usually results in lower stress nitride films.

== History ==
Dichlorosilane was originally prepared by Stock and Somieski by the reaction of SiH_{4} with hydrogen chloride. Dichlorosilane reacts with water vapor to initially give monomeric prosiloxane: SiH_{2}Cl_{2} + H_{2}O → SiH_{2}O + 2 HCl Monomeric polymerizes rapidly upon condensation or in solution.

== Reactions and formation ==
Most dichlorosilane results as a byproduct of the reaction of HCl with silicon, a reaction intended to give trichlorosilane.

Disproportionation of trichlorosilane is the preferred route.

2 SiHCl_{3} ⇌ SiCl_{4} + SiH_{2}Cl_{2}

== Hydrolysis ==
Stock and Somieski completed the hydrolysis of dichlorosilane by putting the solution of H_{2}SiCl_{2} in benzene in brief contact with a large excess of water. A large-scale hydrolysis was done in a mixed ether/alkane solvent system at 0 °C, which gave a mixture of volatile and nonvolatile [H_{2}SiO]_{n}. Fischer and Kiegsmann attempted the hydrolysis of dichlorosilane in hexane, using NiCl_{2}⋅6H_{2}O as the water source, but the system failed. They did, however, complete the hydrolysis using dilute Et_{2}O/CCl_{4} at -10 °C. The purpose of completing the hydrolysis of dichlorosilane is to collect the concentrated hydrolysis products, distill the solution, and retrieve a solution of [H_{2}SiO]_{n} oligomers in dichloromethane. These methods were used to obtain cyclic polysiloxanes.

Another purpose for hydrolyzing dichlorosilane is to obtain linear polysiloxanes, and can be done by many different complex methods. The hydrolysis of dichlorosilane in diethyl ether, dichloromethane, or pentane gives cyclic and linear polysiloxanes.

== Decomposition ==
Su and Schlegal studied the decomposition of dichlorosilane using transition state theory (TST) using calculations at the G2 level. Wittbrodt and Schlegel worked with these calculations and improved them using the QCISD(T) method. The primary decomposition products were determined by this method to be SiCl_{2} and SiClH.

== Ultrapurification ==
Dichlorosilane must be ultrapurified and concentrated in order to be used for the manufacturing of semiconducting epitaxial silicon layers, which are used for microelectronics. The buildup of the silicon layers produces thick epitaxial layers, which creates a strong structure.

== Advantage of use ==
Dichlorosilane is used as a starting material for semiconducting silicon layers found in microelectronics. It is used because it decomposes at a lower temperature and has a higher growth rate of silicon crystals.

== Safety hazards ==
It is a chemically active gas, which will readily hydrolyze and self ignite in air. Dichlorosilane is also very toxic, and preventative measures must be used for any experiment involving the use of the chemical. Safety hazards also includes skin and eye irritation and inhalation.
