= Shin-Etsu Chemical =

Japanese chemical company

Shin-Etsu Chemical Co., Ltd.

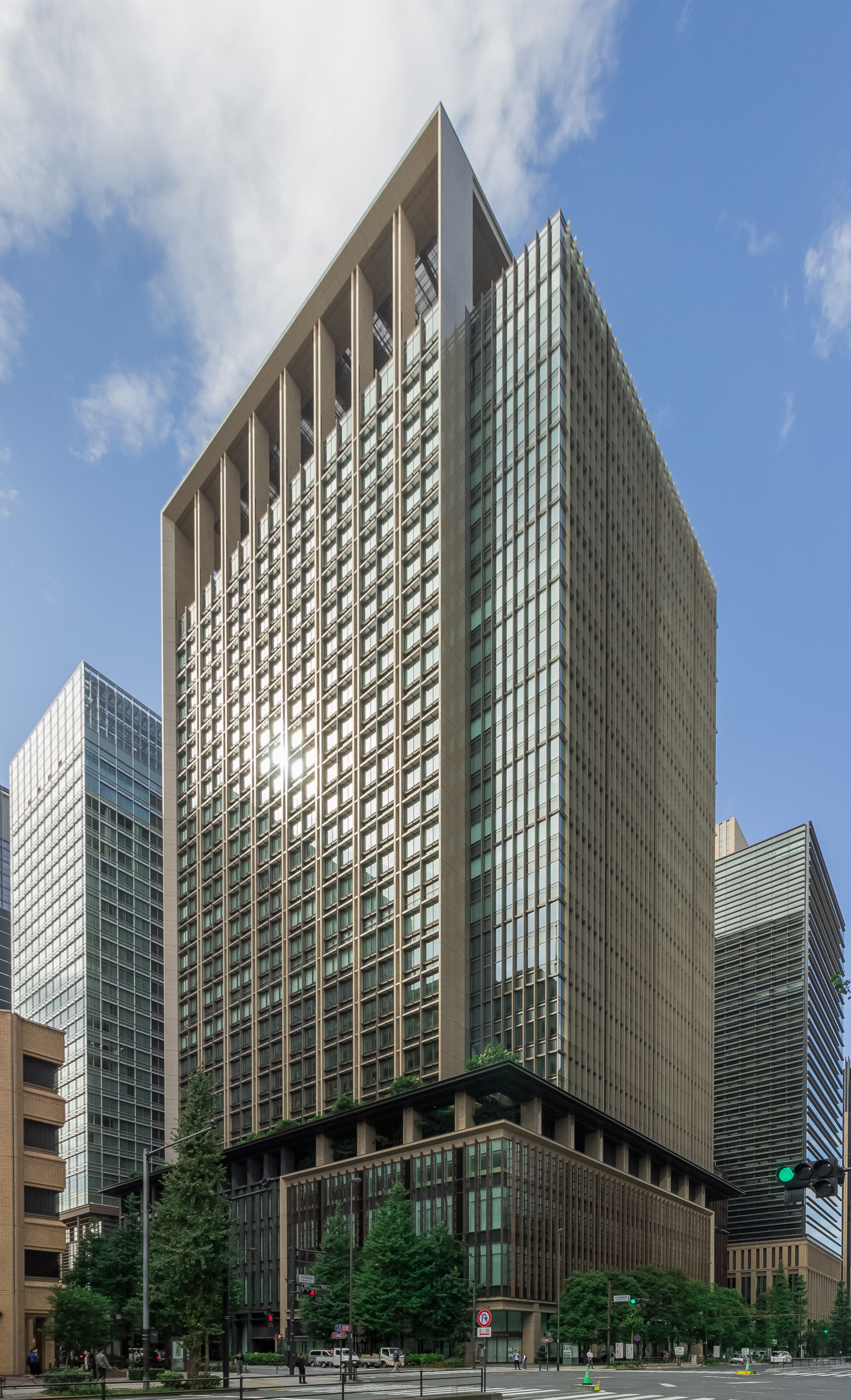
- Headquarters in Marunouchi, Tokyo
- Native name: 信越化学工業株式会社
- Romanized name: Shin'etsu Kagaku Kōgyō kabushiki kaisha
- Type: Public KK
- Traded as: TYO: 4063; NAG: 4063; TOPIX Core30 component
- Industry: Chemicals
- Founded: September 16, 1926; 100 years ago (as Shin-Etsu Nitrogen Fertilizer)
- Headquarters: 4-1, Marunouchi 1-chome, Chiyoda-ku, Tokyo 100-0005, Japan
- Key people: Juzaburo Koto (Founder); Chihiro Kanagawa (Builder of the current business model); Yasuhiko Saito (President)
- Products: Chemicals; Speciality chemicals; Semiconductor silicon; Electronics and functional materials
- Revenue: ▲$ 21.6 billion (FY 2022) (JPY 2,809 billion) (FY 2022)
- Net income: ▲$ 5.4 billion (FY 2022) (JPY 708.2 billion) (FY 2022)
- Number of employees: 26,004 (as of 25 April 2024)
- Website: Official website

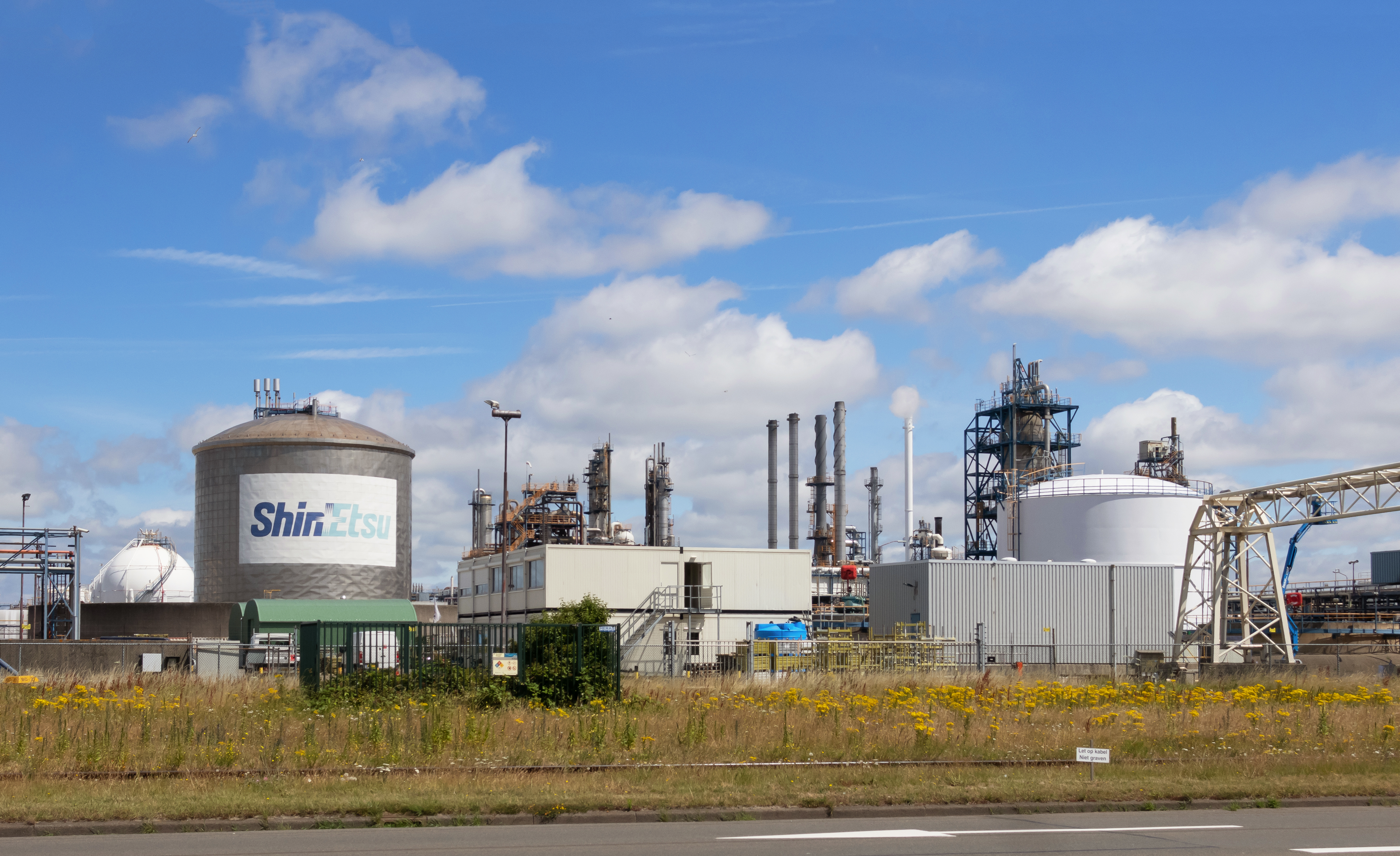
Rotterdam-Botlek, Shin Etsu (vinyl chloride monomer production plant)

Shin-Etsu Chemical Co., Ltd. (信越化学工業株式会社, Shin'etsu Kagaku Kōgyō kabushiki kaisha) is the largest chemical company in Japan. Shin-Etsu has the largest global market share for polyvinyl chloride, semiconductor silicon, and photomask substrates.

"Shin-Etsu" in the company's name derives from Shin'etsu Region, where the company established the first chemical plant as Shin-Etsu Nitrogen Fertilizer in 1926, though the company today is headquartered in Tokyo and has its manufacturing locations in 16 countries worldwide.

Shin-Etsu is listed on the Tokyo Stock Exchange, where it is a component of the Nikkei 225 and TOPIX Core 30 indices.

== History ==
=== 1926–1999 ===
Shin-Etsu Nitrogen Fertilizer Co., Ltd. was founded in 1926 and in 1927 the Naoetsu plant was constructed for the production of carbide and lime nitrogen fertilizer. In 1938 the first facility of the Gunma Complex was established. The company changed its name to Shin-Etsu Chemical Co., Ltd. in 1940. In 1945, the company expanded with the acquisition of the Takefu plant.

In 1949, the company shares were listed on the Tokyo stock exchange. The first silicone production facilities were set up in 1953. Shin-Etsu established Nissin Chemical Industry Co., Ltd. in 1955, which was followed by the establishment of Shin-Etsu Polymer Co., Ltd. in 1960 and two years later the Shin-Etsu Astech Co., Ltd.

The Kashima plant was constructed in 1970 and the following year the company headquarters relocated to the Asahi Seimei Otemachi Building in Ohtemachi, Chiyoda-ku, Tokyo. In 1972, Shin-Etsu Quartz Products Co., Ltd. was established. In 1973, Shin-etsu established its first U.S.-based company named Shintech, Inc., and its first Malaysia-based company, S.E.H. Malaysia Sdn. Bhd.

Production at the Shintech Freeport plant began in 1976, and that same year the PVC & Polymer Materials Research Center and the Silicone Electronics Materials Research Center were established.

In 1985, Shin-Etsu established two more companies in the U.S.: K-Bin, Inc. (U.S.A.) and Shin-Etsu Silicones of America, Inc. Expansion in Korea and Taiwan followed with Shin-Etsu Silicone Korea Co., Ltd. in 1986 and Shin-Etsu Silicone Taiwan Co., Ltd. in 1987. In 1988, the company set up an Advanced Functional Materials Research Center and established Shin-Etsu (Malaysia) Sdn. Bhd. In 1996 Shin-Etsu acquired the Australian company Simcoa Operations Pty. Ltd. In 1997, they launched its photoresists business and began production at the Naoetsu Plant in Niigata Prefecture.

=== 2000–present ===
Construction of the first phase of the Shintech Addis plant was completed in 2000, and the second in 2002. The company set up Asia Silicones Monomer Ltd. and Shin-Etsu Silicones Ltd. in Thailand during 2001 and in 2002, Shin-Etsu Chemical established Zhejiang Shin-Etsu High-Tech Chemical Co., Ltd in the Zhejiang Province of China for the production of silicon products. Also that year, JAPAN VAM&POVAL Co., Ltd. was established.
