= Nitol botnet =

Computer malware spreading botnet

The Nitol botnet mostly involved in spreading malware and distributed denial-of-service attacks.

== History ==
The Nitol Botnet was first discovered around December 2012, with analysis of the botnet indicating that the botnet is mostly prevalent in China where an estimate 85% of the infections are detected. In China the botnet was found to be present on systems that came brand-new from the factory, indicating the trojan was installed somewhere during the assembly and manufacturing process. According to Microsoft the systems at risk also contained a counterfeit installation of Microsoft Windows.

On 10 September 2012 Microsoft took action against the Nitol Botnet by obtaining a court order and subsequently sinkholing the 3322.org domain. The 3322.org domain is a Dynamic DNS which was used by the botnet creators as a command and control infrastructure for controlling their botnet. Microsoft later settled with 3322.org operator Pen Yong, which allowed the latter to continue operating the domain on the condition that any subdomains linked to malware remain sinkholed.

== See also ==
- Internet crime
- Internet security
