= Dumai-Malacca Cable System =

Dumai-Malacca Cable System or DMCS is a submarine telecommunications cable system linking Indonesia and Malaysia across the Strait of Malacca

It has landing points in:

- Dumai, Riau Province, Indonesia
- Melaka City, Malacca, Malaysia

It has a design transmission capacity of 320 Gbit/s of which 20 Gbit/s were lit at inception, and a total cable length of 150 km. It was inaugurated on 17 February 2005.
