= Dow Corning =

Multinational corporation

Dow Corning Corporation
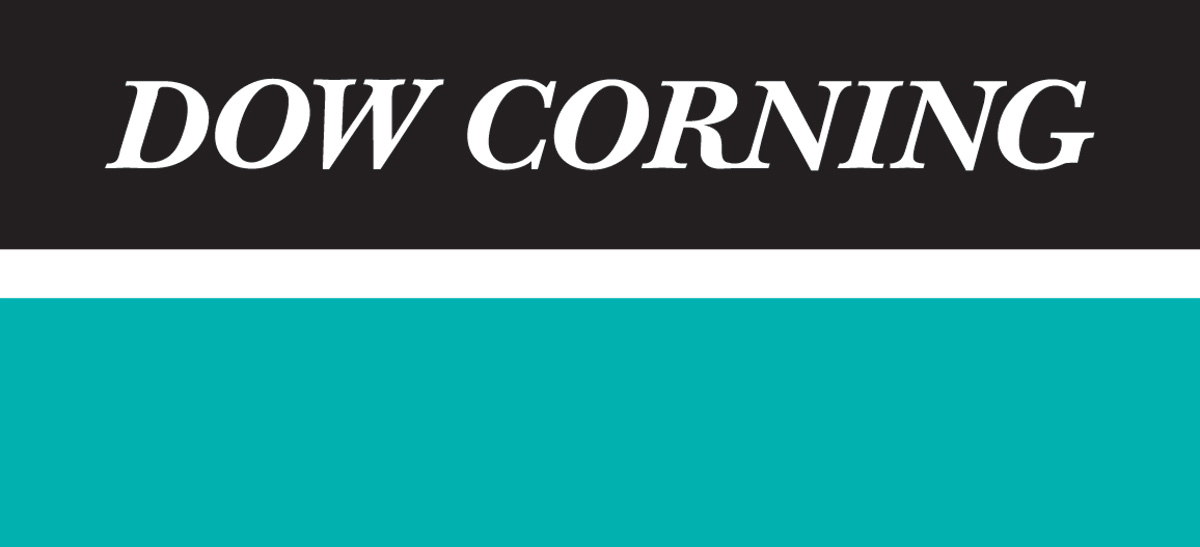
- Type: Joint Venture
- Industry: Manufacturing Research & Development
- Founded: 1943
- Headquarters: Midland, Michigan
- Key people: Mauro Gregorio, CEO & President
- Products: Speciality chemicals, silicon derived polymers
- Revenue: $6.12 billion (2012)
- Number of employees: 12,000
- Parent: The Dow Chemical Company & Corning Inc
- Website: www.dowcorning.com

Dow Corning Corporation was an American multinational corporation headquartered in Midland, Michigan, United States, and was originally established as a joint venture between The Dow Chemical Company and Corning Incorporated. In 2016, Dow bought out Corning, Inc. making Dow Corning a 100% Dow subsidiary. After a brief existence as a DowDuPont-owned company, Dow spun out from DowDuPont on April 1, 2019. The new company, Dow Silicones Corporation, which is wholly owned by Dow, specializes in silicone and silicon-based technology, and is the largest silicone product producer in the world. DOWSIL™ is the trade name for Dow Corning's 7,000+ products and services.

== History ==
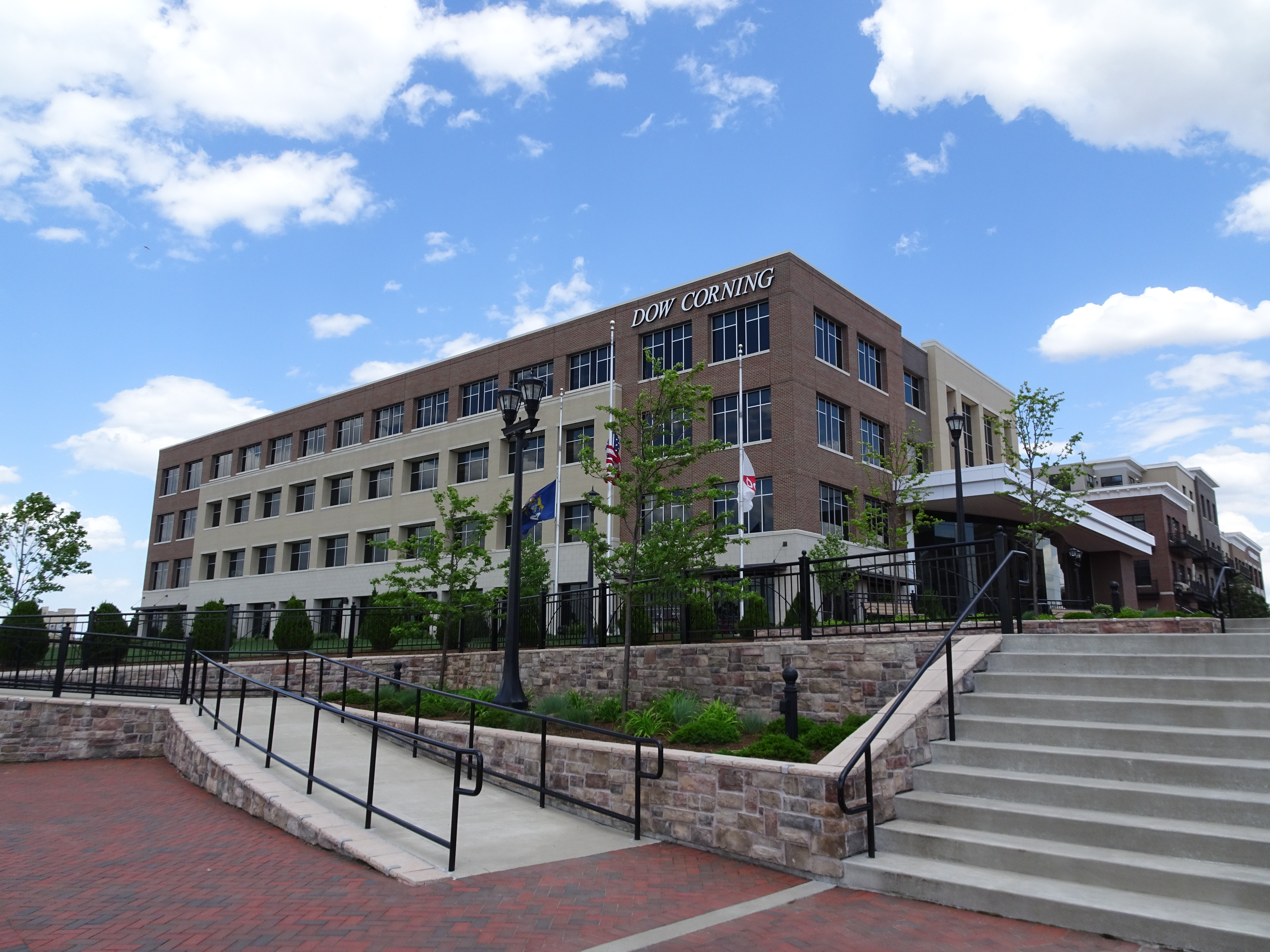
Dow Corning, Bay City

Dow Corning was formally established in 1943 as a joint venture between the American conglomerates Dow Chemical and Corning Glass to explore the potential of silicone, and was a manufacturer of products for use by the U.S. military in World War II. The company began operating its first plant in Midland, Michigan in 1945. Dr. E.C. Sullivan was named president, and Dr. William R. Collings was named general manager in 1943. Dr. Collings later became president from 1954 until 1962. It expanded into Canada and Europe in 1948, and into South America and Japan in 1961.

A large, majority-owned subsidiary of Dow Corning Corporation is the Hemlock Semiconductor Corporation. It is one of the world's largest producers of high-purity polycrystalline silicon, which is sold in varying purity grades for use in both semiconductor silicon wafer manufacture and photovoltaics applications as solar cells.

On November 13, 2014, The Dow Chemical Company's former CEO Andrew N. Liveris revealed in a presentation to investors that Corning Incorporated intended to exit the joint venture of 71 years, citing other priorities. Following the December 11, 2015 announcement that it would merge with DuPont, Dow also announced on the same day that it had reached a deal to acquire Corning's stake in Dow Corning in exchange for $4.8 billion in cash and Corning gaining a roughly 40% stake in Hemlock Semiconductor Corporation. Dow Chemical assumed full ownership of Dow Corning on June 1, 2016. The company changed its name to Dow Silicones Corporation in 2018.

== Products ==
Dow Corning marketed over 7000 products, including various sealants, adhesives, rubbers, lubricants, silicon oils and solvents. Around 2,100 of these are available through the Dow Corning online-only distributor Xiameter, including fluids, gels, resins. The range of industries targeted by Dow Corning products spans from electronics and automotive to construction, healthcare and others. In recent years, the company has expanded production of solar cells, particularly through its majority stake in Hemlock Semiconductor Corporation, which accounts for a polysilicon franchise worth over $1 billion. In 2011, then-CTO Gregg Zank explained that the company tries to focus its product development on societal “megatrends” (e.g. energy scarcity and urbanization).

== Problems with breast implants ==
Throughout the 1980s and 1990s, class-action lawsuits brought by tens of thousands of plaintiffs claimed that Dow Corning's silicone breast implants caused systemic health problems. The claims first centered on breast cancer and then migrated to a range of autoimmune diseases, including lupus, rheumatoid arthritis and various neurological problems. This led to numerous lawsuits beginning in 1984 and culminating in a 1998 $3.2 Billion class action settlement. As a result, Dow Corning was in bankruptcy protection for nine years, ending in June 2004 during which time it largely withdrew from clinical markets.

Although a number of independent reviews, including the Institute of Medicine in the United States, subsequently indicated that silicone breast implants do not cause breast cancers or any identifiable systemic diseases, on 21 March 2017, the FDA issued a statement indicating that women with breast implants have a "very low but increased risk" of getting a rare form of cancer called anaplastic large-cell lymphoma (ALCL). The cancer is associated with nine deaths, the FDA said. These findings have caused an uptick in breast implant removal surgeries.
