= Chlorodimethylsilane =

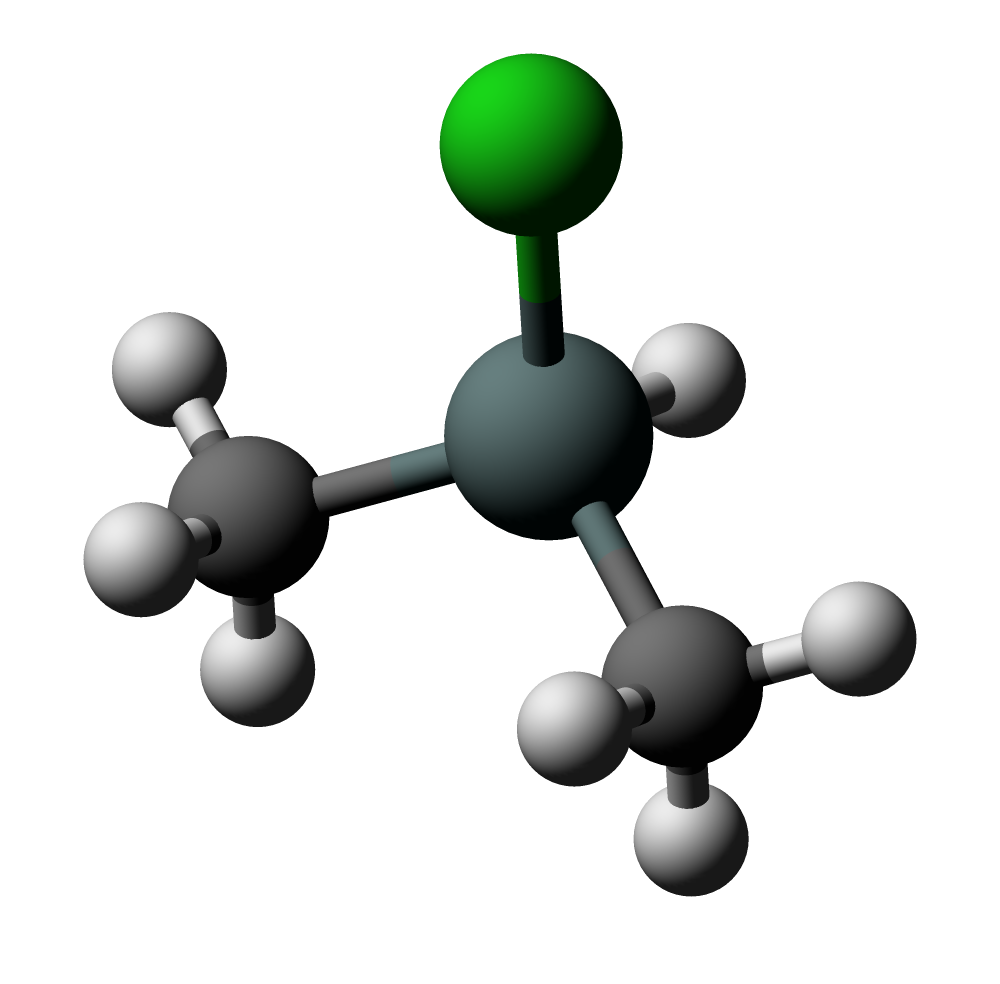

Names
- Preferred IUPAC name Chlorodi(methyl)silane
- Other names Dimethylchlorosilane, DMCS

Identifiers
CAS Number	1066-35-9
3D model (JSmol)	Interactive image
ChemSpider	59496
ECHA InfoCard	100.012.648
EC Number	213-912-0
PubChem CID	6327132
UNII	XR7E4F5838
UN number	2924
CompTox Dashboard (EPA)	DTXSID0027355
- InChI: InChI=1S/C2H7ClSi/c1-4(2)3/h4H,1-2H3 Key: YGHUUVGIRWMJGE-UHFFFAOYSA-N; InChI=1/C2H7ClSi/c1-4(2)3/h4H,1-2H3 Key: YGHUUVGIRWMJGE-UHFFFAOYAP
- SMILES: Cl[SiH](C)C

Properties
Chemical formula	(CH_{3})_{2}SiHCl
Molar mass	94.62 g/mol
Density	0.852 g/mL, 25 °C
Melting point	−111 °C (−168 °F; 162 K)
Boiling point	34.7 °C (94.5 °F; 307.8 K)

Hazards
- GHS labelling
Pictograms	(GHS02: Flammable) (GHS05: Corrosive) (GHS06: Toxic)
Signal word	Danger
Hazard statements	H224, H261, H314, H331
Precautionary statements	P210, P231+P232, P233, P240, P241, P242, P243, P260, P264, P271, P280, P301+P330+P331, P303+P361+P353, P304+P340, P305+P351+P338, P310, P311, P321, P363, P370+P378, P402+P404, P403+P233, P403+P235, P405, P501

Related compounds
Related compounds	Dichloromethylsilane, Trichlorosilane, Trimethylsilane
- Except where otherwise noted, data are given for materials in their standard state (at 25 °C [77 °F], 100 kPa). verify (what is ?) Infobox references

Chlorodimethylsilane, also called dimethylchlorosilane and abbreviated DMCS, is a chemical compound with the formula (CH_{3})_{2}SiHCl. It is a silane, with a silicon atom bonded to two methyl groups, a chlorine atom, and a hydrogen atom.

Its structure, including bond lengths and bond angles, has been determined using Fourier transform microwave spectroscopy.
