= Methylsiloxanes =

Methylsiloxanes are a class of compounds often used for water-repellant industrial lubricants, where the organic groups hanging off the silicon atoms are methyls. They may make up 2% to 4.3% of the total mass of organic aerosols.

An example of this chemical class is polydimethylsiloxanes (PDMS).
