= Trichlorosilane =

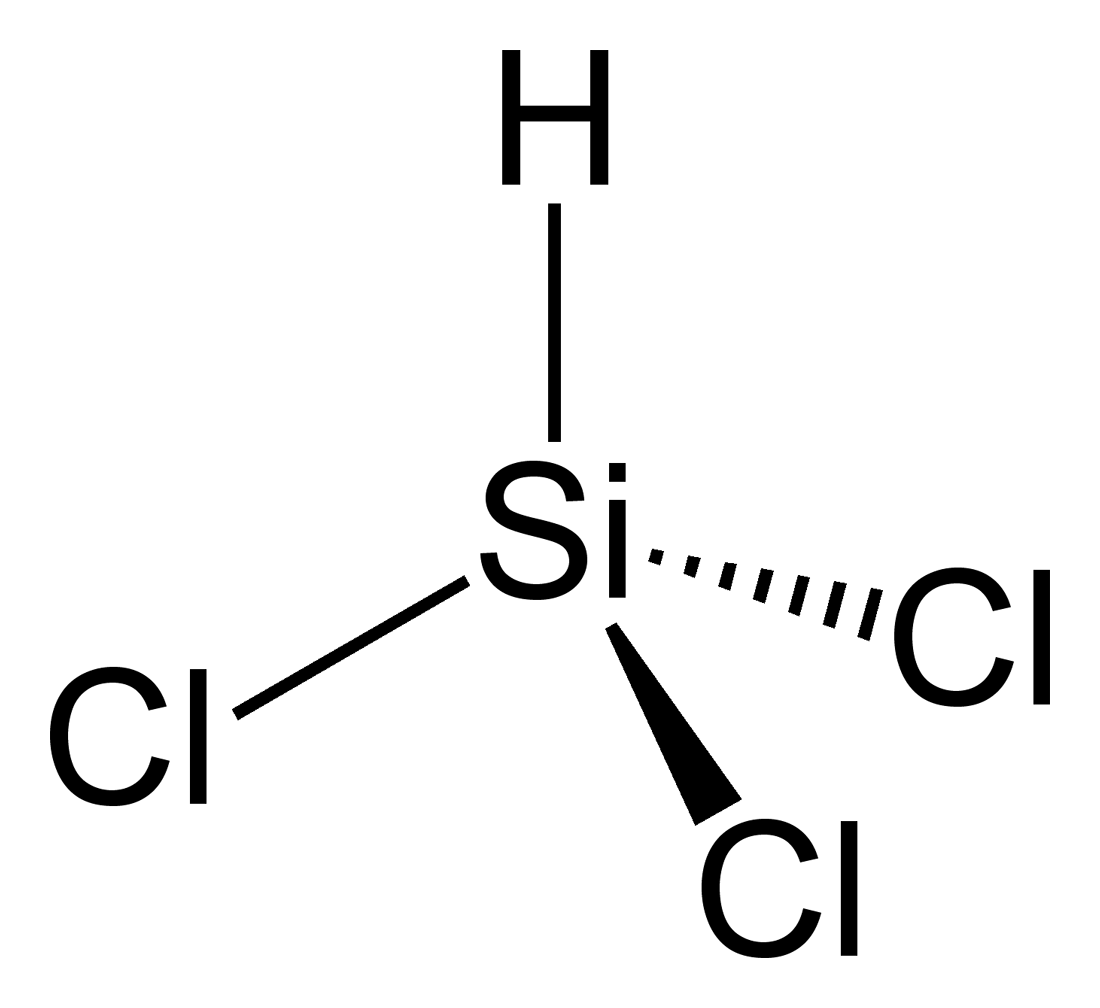

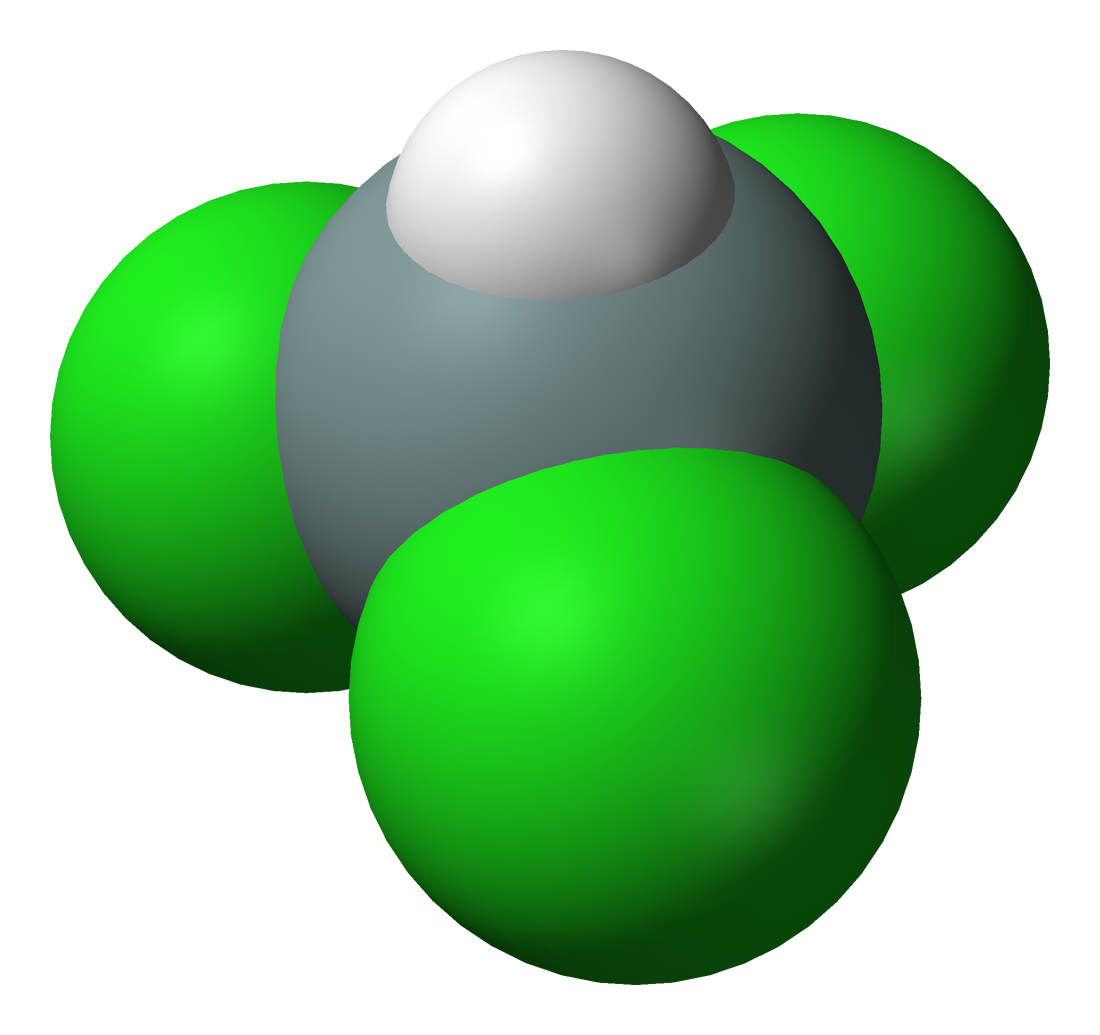

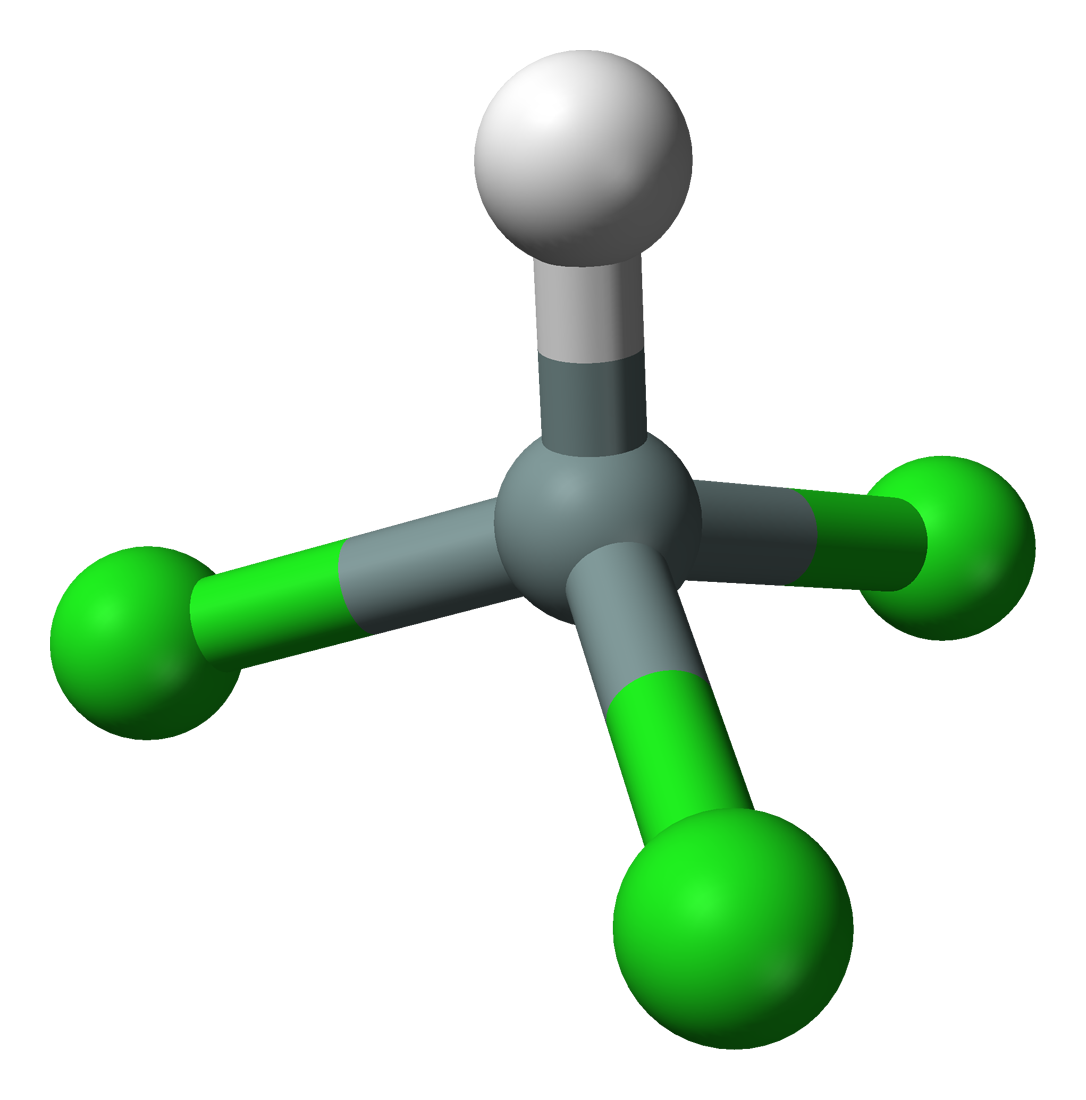

Names
- IUPAC name trichlorosilane
- Other names silyl trichloride, silicochloroform

Identifiers
CAS Number	10025-78-2
3D model (JSmol)	Interactive image
ChemSpider	23196
ECHA InfoCard	100.030.026
EC Number	233-042-5
PubChem CID	24811
RTECS number	VV5950000
UNII	QZY2645L6V
UN number	1295
CompTox Dashboard (EPA)	DTXSID4029301
- InChI: InChI=1S/Cl3HSi/c1-4(2)3/h4H Key: ZDHXKXAHOVTTAH-UHFFFAOYSA-N; InChI=1/Cl3HSi/c1-4(2)3/h4H Key: ZDHXKXAHOVTTAH-UHFFFAOYAH
- SMILES: Cl[SiH](Cl)Cl

Properties
Chemical formula	HCl_{3}Si
Molar mass	135.45 g/mol
Appearance	colourless liquid
Density	1.342 g/cm^{3}
Melting point	−126.6 °C (−195.9 °F; 146.6 K)
Boiling point	31.8 °C (89.2 °F; 304.9 K)
Solubility in water	hydrolysis

Hazards
- GHS labelling
Pictograms	(GHS02: Flammable) (GHS05: Corrosive) (GHS06: Toxic) (GHS07: Exclamation mark)
Signal word	Danger
Hazard statements	H224, H250, H302, H314, H332
Precautionary statements	P231, P280, P305+P351+P338+P310, P310, P370+P378
NFPA 704 (fire diamond)	3 4 2 W
Flash point	−27 °C (−17 °F; 246 K)
Autoignition temperature	185 °C (365 °F; 458 K)
Explosive limits	1.2–90.5%
Safety data sheet (SDS)	ICSC 0591

Related compounds
Related chlorosilanes	Chlorosilane; Dichlorosilane; Dichloromethylsilane; Chlorodimethylsilane; Silicon tetrachloride
Related compounds	Trifluorosilane; Tribromosilane; Chloroform
- Except where otherwise noted, data are given for materials in their standard state (at 25 °C [77 °F], 100 kPa). verify (what is ?) Infobox references

Trichlorosilane (TCS) is an inorganic compound with the formula HCl_{3}Si. It is a colourless, volatile liquid. Purified trichlorosilane is the principal precursor to ultrapure silicon in the semiconductor industry. In water, it rapidly decomposes to produce a siloxane polymer while giving off hydrochloric acid. Because of its reactivity and wide availability, it is frequently used in the synthesis of silicon-containing organic compounds.

== Production ==
Trichlorosilane is produced by treating powdered metallurgical grade silicon with blowing hydrogen chloride at 300 °C in a hydrochlorination process. Hydrogen is also produced, as described in the chemical equation:

Si + 3 HCl → HCl_{3}Si + H_{2}

Yields of 80-90% can be achieved. The main byproducts are silicon tetrachloride (chemical formula SiCl_{4}), hexachlorodisilane (Si_{2}Cl_{6}) and dichlorosilane (H_{2}SiCl_{2}), from which trichlorosilane can be separated by distillation.

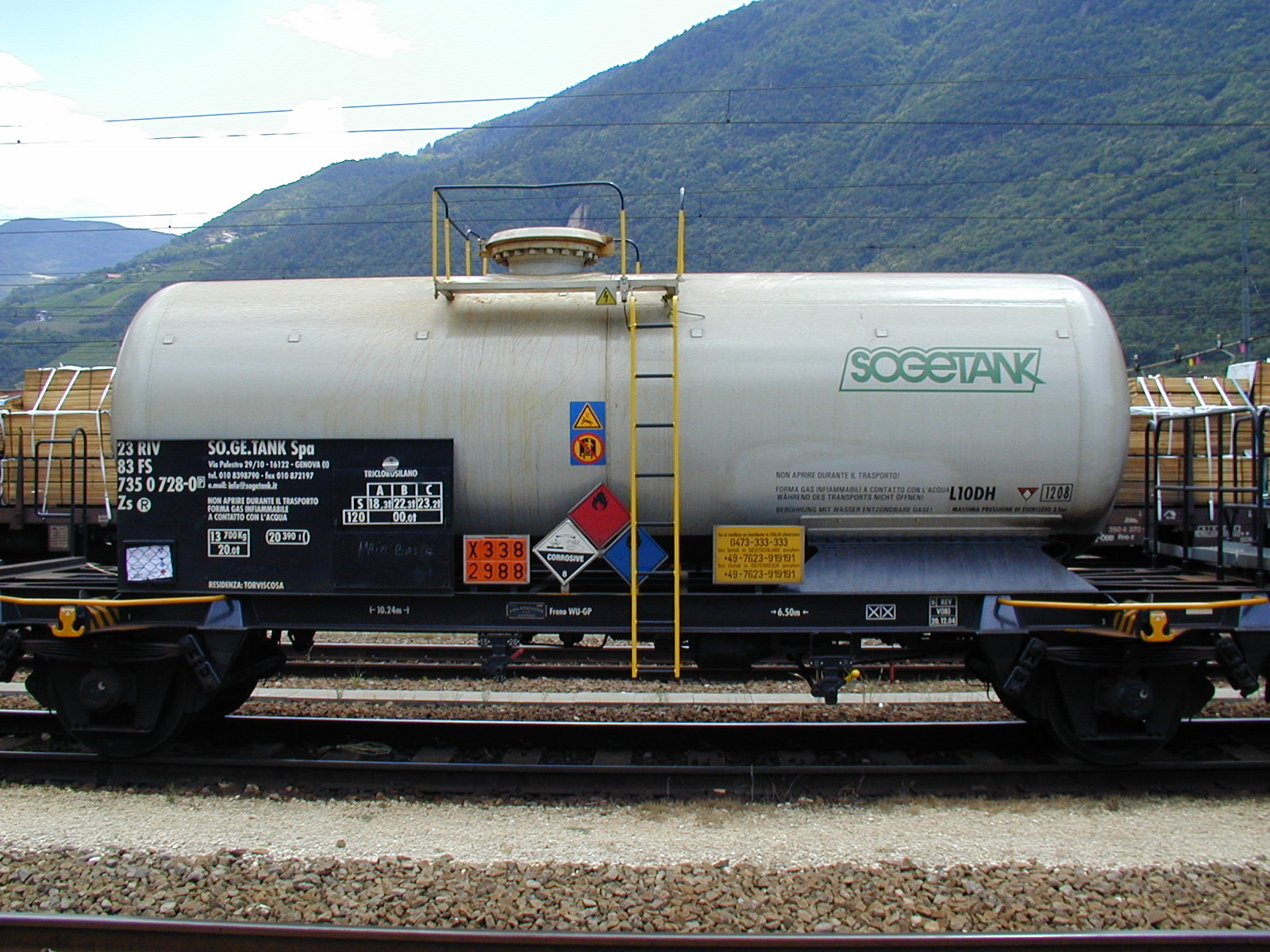
Tank car of trichlorosilane. UN number: 2988 (Chlorosilanes). ADR hazard identification number: X338 (Highly flammable liquid, corrosive, which reacts dangerously with water)

It is also produced from silicon tetrachloride in a direct chlorination process:

Si + 3 SiCl_{4} + 2 H_{2} → 4 HCl_{3}Si

Both methods are widely used. The first method is cheaper but yield is hard to control. The second method doesn't require as much control, but needs twice as much capital investment and consumes 120 to 200 kWh/kg compared to 65-90 kWh/kg for the first method. The distillation of TCS purifies it substantially and with it, most of the impurities in the silicon are removed.

== Uses ==
Trichlorosilane is the basic ingredient used in the production of purified polysilicon.

HCl_{3}Si → Si + HCl + Cl_{2}

It can be used in a chemical vapor deposition process called the Siemens process.

=== Ingredient in hydrosilylation ===
Via hydrosilylation, trichlorosilane is a precursor to other useful organosilicon compounds:

RCH=CH_{2} + HSiCl_{3} → RCH_{2}CH_{2}SiCl_{3}

Some useful products of this or similar reactions include octadecyltrichlorosilane (OTS), perfluoroctyltrichlorosilane (PFOTCS), and perfluorodecyltrichlorosilane (FDTS). These reagents used in surface science and nanotechnology to form self-assembled monolayers. Such layers containing fluorine decrease surface energy and reduce sticking. This effect is usually exploited as coating for MEMS and microfabricated stamps for a nanoimprint lithography (NIL) and in injection molding tools.

=== Organic synthesis ===
Trichlorosilane is a reagent in the conversion of benzoic acids to toluene derivatives. In the first step of a two-pot reaction, the carboxylic acid is first converted to the trichlosilylbenzyl compound. In the second step, the benzylic silyl derivative is converted to the toluene derivative with base.

== Safety ==
Trichlorosilane is highly reactive, and may respond violently (and even explosively) to many compounds. This also includes water, potentially producing silicon dioxide, chlorine, hydrogen, hydrogen chloride (and its aqueous form hydrochloric acid), and heat. Trichlorosilane can cause hazardous chemical reactions with moisture and humidity alone, and should be handled and stored under inert gas. Spills of trichlorosilane may be neutralized using a 1-1 ratio of sodium hydroxide, or a 2-1 ratio of sodium bicarbonate to trichlorosilane. Fires can be extinguished using alcohol-resistant aqueous film-forming foam (AR-AFFF).
