= Organolanthanide chemistry =

Study of chemical compounds containing lanthanide-carbon bonds

Organolanthanide chemistry is the field of chemistry that studies organolanthanides, compounds with a lanthanide-carbon bond. Organolanthanide compounds are different from their organotransition metal analogues in the following ways:

- They are far more air- and water-sensitive and are often pyrophoric.
- Chemistry in the 0 oxidation state is far more limited. In fact, their electropositive nature makes their organometallic compounds more likely to be ionic.
- They form no stable carbonyls at room temperature; organolanthanide carbonyl compounds have been observed only in argon matrices, and decompose when heated to 40 K.

== σ-Bonded complexes ==
Metal-carbon σ bonds are found in alkyls of the lanthanide elements such as [LnMe_{6}]^{3−} and Ln[CH(SiMe_{3})_{2}]_{3}. Methyllithium dissolved in THF reacts in stoichiometric ratio with LnCl_{3} (Ln = Y, La) to yield Ln(CH_{3})_{3} probably contaminated with LiCl.

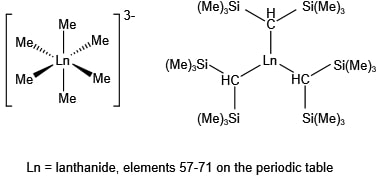
Chemical structures of [LnMe6]3- and Ln[CH(SiMe3)2]3

If a chelating agent (L-L), such as tetramethylethylenediamine (tmed or tmeda) or 1,2-dimethoxyethane (dme) is mixed with MCl_{3} and CH_{3}Li in THF, this forms [Li(tmed)]_{3}[M(CH_{3})_{6}] and [Li(dme)]_{3}[M(CH_{3})_{6}].

Certain powdered lanthanides react with diphenylmercury in THF to yield octahedral complexes

2 Ln + 3 Ph2Hg + 6 THF → 2 LnPh3(THF)3 + Hg,

where Ln = Ho, Er, Tm, Lu.

== π-Bonded complexes ==
Cyclopentadienyl complexes, including several lanthanocenes, are known for all lanthanides. All, barring tris(cyclopentadienyl)promethium(III) (Pm(Cp)_{3}), can be produced by the following reaction scheme:

3 Na[Cp] + MCl3 → M[Cp]3 + 3 NaCl

Pm(Cp)_{3} can be produced by the following reaction:

2 PmCl3 + 3 Be[Cp]2 → 3 BeCl2 + 2 Pm[Cp]3

These compounds are of limited use and academic interest.

== History ==
The history of organolanthanide chemistry highlights the integration of lanthanides into organometallic research, beginning with the discovery of lanthanides in Scandinavia in 1794. The field gained significant traction following the discovery of metallocenes like ferrocene in 1951. This finding prompted chemists to explore the coordination behavior of such complexes with lanthanides. The 1970s and 1980s saw a boom in organolanthanide applications, particularly in catalysis. By the 2000s, single-molecule magnets (SMMs) further showcased the unique properties of these complexes, establishing their potential in advanced materials and magnetic applications.

Today, organolantanide chemistry continues to grow, emphasizing sustainability, advanced materials for electronics and photonics, and potential applications in biological and medicinal contexts.

== Applications ==
=== Catalysis ===
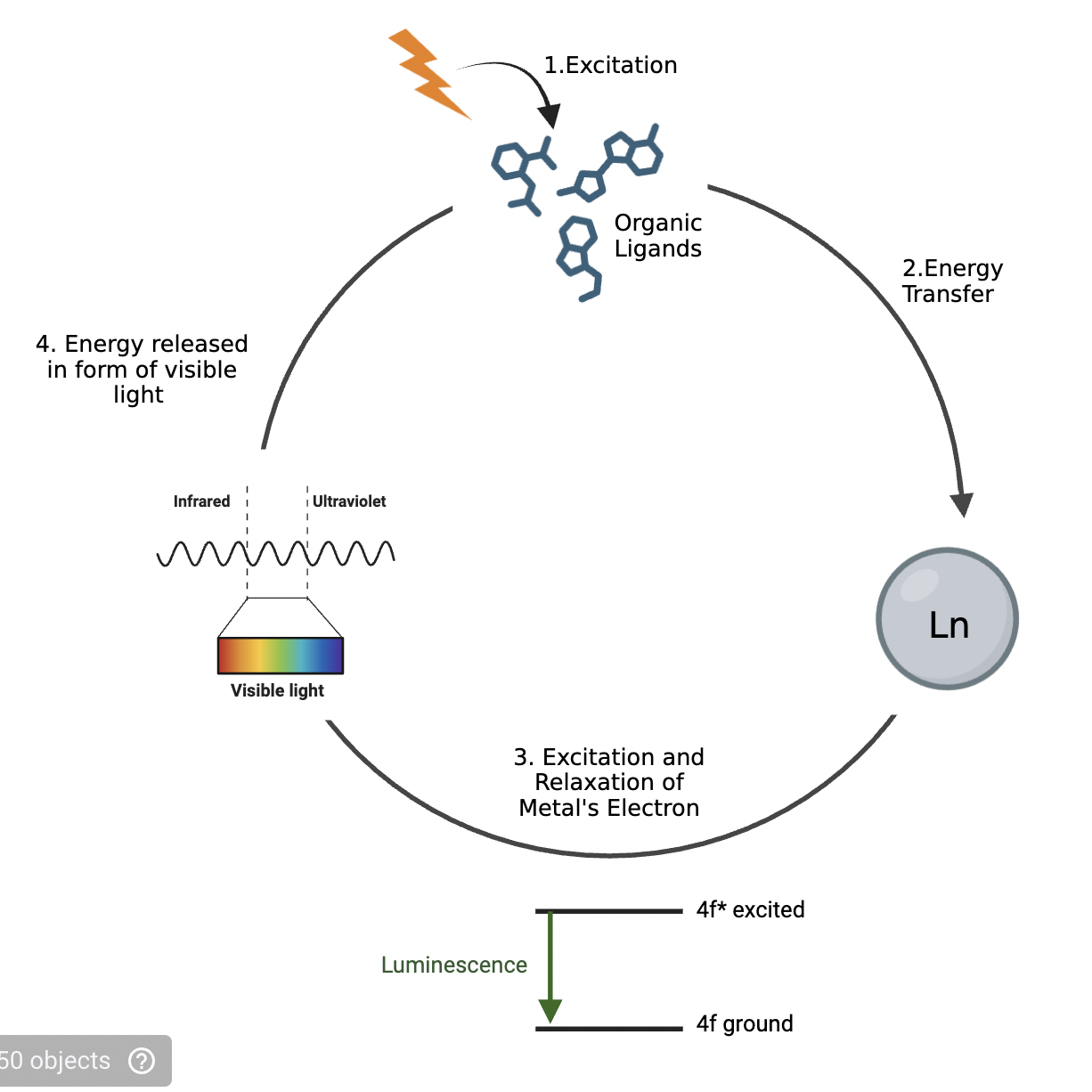
Organolanthanide complexes serving as electroluminescent material.

Organolanthanide complexes are powerful catalysts due to lanthanides' unique characteristics and properties, such as large ionic radii and oxophilicity. They catalyze a variety of reactions, for instance:

1. hydroamination
2. hydroalkoxylation
3. olefin polymerization
4. selective hydrogenation

which are crucial in promoting efficient synthesis of complex molecules as the products of these reactions often serve as key intermediates or building blocks in further transformations.

=== Material science ===
Organolanthanide complexes are commonly used as electroluminescent materials due to their ability to facilitate energy transitions within the visible light spectrum. Their high color purity and near-unity quantum yields make them essential in photonic and display technologies, including advanced lighting, defense systems, magnets, bio-markers, and electronics. Organolanthanide complexes are gaining attention for their energy efficiency, cost-effectiveness, and growing role in analyte detection, emphasizing their increasing importance in modern, high-performance systems.

== Current challenges ==
While organolanthanide complexes have shown considerable promise in fields like catalysis and luminescence, several significant challenges limit their widespread application. One of the primary issues is their sensitivity to air and moisture. The lanthanide ions in these complexes can readily react with oxygen and water, leading to oxidation or hydrolysis, which damages the material’s structure and reduces its efficiency. This makes handling and storage difficult, requiring protective environments like sealed containers or inert gas atmospheres.

Another major concern is thermal stability. Organolanthanide complexes tend to degrade or lose their functionality at elevated temperatures. This is especially problematic in applications where temperature fluctuations or high temperatures are common, such as in industrial processes or certain lighting technologies. The stability of the complex at different temperatures is crucial for its practical use.

Furthermore, while these complexes are efficient light emitters, their radiative properties need further improvement. Radiative properties refer to the efficiency with which the complex emits light after absorbing energy. The quantum yield and lifetime of emission are critical factors in determining the brightness and overall performance of luminescent materials. To enhance their use in energy-efficient technologies, improving these characteristics is essential. Achieving a higher emission-to-absorption ratio would increase their brightness and make them more competitive for applications in displays, lighting, and sensing technologies.

Addressing these challenges would unlock the full potential of organolanthanide complexes, making them more effective and versatile in real-world applications.

== See also ==
- Organocerium chemistry
