= Copper hydride =

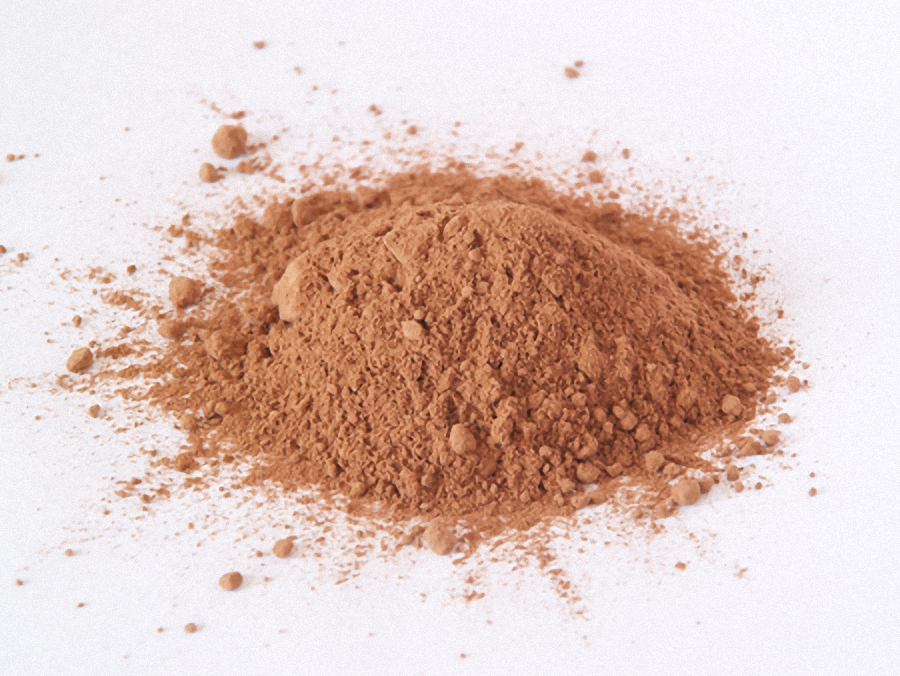

Names
- IUPAC name Copper hydride
- Other names: Copper(I) hydride; Cuprous hydride; Hydridocopper(I); Cuprane; poly[cuprane(1)]

Identifiers
CAS Number	13517-00-5
3D model (JSmol)	Interactive image
ChemSpider	2582262
ECHA InfoCard	100.229.864
EC Number	803-023-1
PubChem CID	3335333
CompTox Dashboard (EPA)	DTXSID50391571
- InChI: InChI=1S/Cu.H Key: JJFLDSOAQUJVBF-UHFFFAOYSA-N
- SMILES: [CuH]

Properties
Chemical formula	CuH
Molar mass	64.554 g·mol^{−1}
Melting point	100 °C (212 °F; 373 K)

Hazards
- GHS labelling
Pictograms	(GHS02: Flammable) (GHS07: Exclamation mark)
Signal word	Danger
Hazard statements	H228, H315, H319, H335
Precautionary statements	P210, P240, P241, P261, P264, P264+P265, P271, P280, P302+P352, P304+P340, P305+P351+P338, P319, P321, P332+P317, P337+P317, P362+P364, P370+P378, P403+P233, P405, P501
- NIOSH (US health exposure limits)
PEL (Permissible)	1 mg/m^{3} (TWA as Cu)
REL (Recommended)	1 mg/m^{3} (TWA as Cu)
IDLH (Immediate danger)	100 mg/m^{3} (TWA as Cu)
- Except where otherwise noted, data are given for materials in their standard state (at 25 °C [77 °F], 100 kPa). Infobox references

Copper hydride is an inorganic compound with the chemical formula CuH_{n} where n ≈ 0.95. It is a red solid, rarely isolated as a pure composition, that decomposes to the elements.

== Structure ==
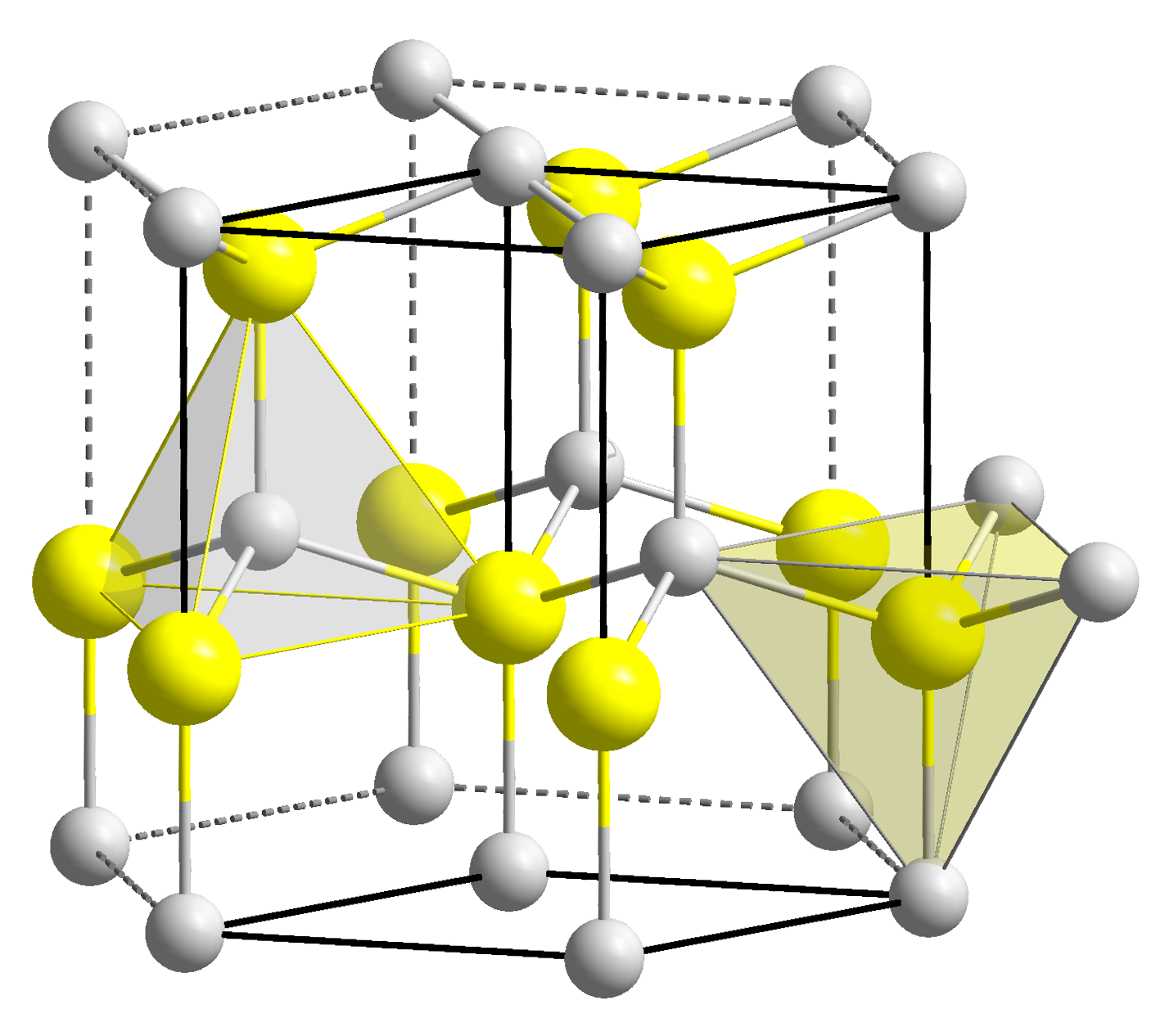
Wurtzite structure

In copper hydride, elements adopt the Wurtzite crystal structure (polymeric), being connected by covalent bonds.

== Production ==
Copper does not react with hydrogen even on heating, thus copper hydrides are made indirectly from copper(I) and copper(II) precursors.

CuH can be produced by many methods, although the detailed nature of the product varies somewhat. These differences are ascribed to particle size and surface structure, namely, bonded hydroxyls for the aqueous routes and a coordinated donor for the nonaqueous routes.Treating aqueous copper sulfate with sodium borohydride give a hydrated form CuH. The water can be exchanged by ethanol.

CuH is also produced by the reduction of copper(II) sulfate with sodium hypophosphite in the presence of sulfuric acid, or more simply with just hypophosphorous acid. Other reducing agents, including classical aluminium hydrides can be used.

4 Cu^{2+} + 6 H_{3}PO_{2} + 6 H_{2}O → 4 CuH + 6 H_{3}PO_{3} + 8 H^{+}

The reactions produce a red-colored precipitate of approximate composition CuH, which slowly decomposes to liberate hydrogen, even at 0 °C (32 °F).

2 CuH → 2 Cu + H_{2}

The material is pyrophoric if dried.

High purity CuH nanoparticles can be obtained from basic copper carbonate, CuCO_{3}·Cu(OH)_{2}. This method is reportedly faster and produces a higher yield than the synthesis from copper sulfate. The obtained CuH can be converted to conducting thin films of Cu by spraying the CuH nanoparticles in their synthesis medium into some insulating support. After drying, conducting Cu films protected by a layer of mixed copper oxides are formed.

=== Reductive sonication ===
Copper hydride is also produced by reductive sonication. In this process, hexaaquacopper(II) and hydrogen(•) react to produce copper hydride and oxonium according to the proposed equation:

[Cu(H_{2}O)_{6}]^{2+} + 3 H^{•} → 1/n(CuH)n + 2 [H_{3}O]^{+} + 4 H_{2}O

Hydrogen(•) is obtained in situ from the homolysis of water.

== Applications in organic synthesis ==
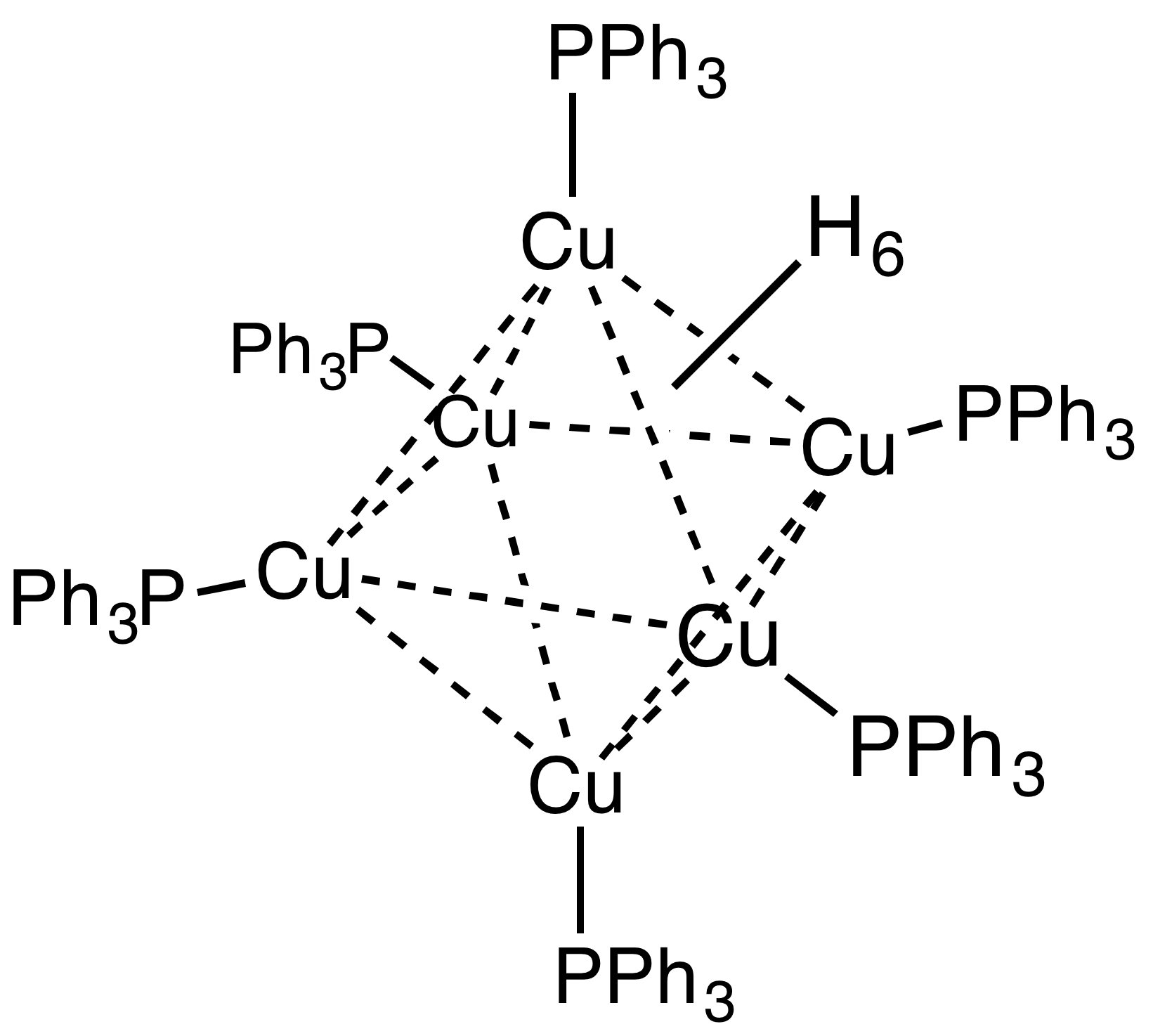
Structure of [(Ph_{3}P)CuH]_{6}.

Phosphine- and NHC-copper hydride species have been developed as reagents in organic synthesis, albeit of limited use. Most widely used is [(Ph3P)CuH]6 (Stryker's reagent) for the reduction of α,β-unsaturated carbonyl compounds. H_{2} (at least 80 psi (550 kPa)) and hydrosilanes can be used as the terminal reductant, allowing a catalytic amount of [(Ph_{3}P)CuH]_{6} to be used for conjugate reduction reactions.

Chiral phosphine-copper complexes catalyze hydrosilation of ketones and esters with low enantioselectivities. An enantioselective (80 to 92% ee) reduction of prochiral α,β-unsaturated esters uses Tol-BINAP complexes of copper in the presence of PMHS as the reductant.Subsequently, conditions have been developed for the CuH-catalyzed hydrosilylation of ketones and imines proceeding with excellent levels of chemo- and enantioselectivity.

The reactivity of L_{n}CuH species with weakly activated (e.g. styrenes, dienes) and unactivated alkenes (e.g. α-olefins) and alkynes has been recognized and has served as the basis for several copper-catalyzed formal hydrofunctionalization reactions.

== Reactions ==
CuH generally behaves as a source of H^{−}. For instance, in the double displacement reaction of CuH with hydrochloric acid:

CuH + HCl → CuCl + H_{2}

When not cooled below −5 °C (23 °F), copper hydride decomposes, to produce hydrogen gas and a mixture containing elemental copper:

2 CuH → xCu·(2-x)CuH +x/2H_{2}; (0 < x < 2)

Solid copper hydride is the irreversible autopolymerisation product of the molecular form, and the molecular form cannot be isolated in concentration.

== History ==
In 1844, the French chemist Adolphe Wurtz synthesised copper hydride for the first time. He reduced an aqueous solution of copper(II) sulfate with hypophosphorous acid (H_{3}PO_{2}). In 2011, Panitat Hasin and Yiying Wu were the first to synthesise a metal hydride (copper hydride) using the technique of sonication. In 2013, it was established by Donnerer et al. that, at least up to fifty gigapascals, copper hydride cannot be synthesised by pressure alone. However, they were successful in synthesising several copper-hydrogen alloys under pressure.

== Related compounds ==
A binary dihydride (CuH_{2}) also exists, in the form of an unstable reactive intermediate in the reduction of copper hydride by atomic hydrogen. Ligated copper hydrides (Cu(I)H) can participate in hydrocupration reactions.

== "Hydridocopper" ==
The diatomic species CuH is a gas that has attracted the attention of spectroscopists. It polymerises upon being condensed. A well-known oligomer is octahedro-hexacuprane(6), occurring in Stryker's reagent. Hydridocopper has acidic behavior for the same reason as normal copper hydride. However, it does not form stable aqueous solutions, due in part to its autopolymerisation, and its tendency to be oxidised by water. Copper hydride reversibly precipitates from pyridine solution, as an amorphous solid. However, repeated dissolution affords the regular crystalline form, which is insoluble. Under standard conditions, molecular copper hydride autopolymerises to form the crystalline form, including under aqueous conditions, hence the aqueous production method devised by Wurtz.

=== Production ===
Molecular copper hydride can be formed by reducing copper iodide with lithium aluminium hydride in ether and pyridine:

4 CuI + LiAlH_{4} → 4 CuH + LiI + AlI_{3}

This was discovered by E Wiberg and W Henle in 1952. The solution of this CuH in the pyridine is typically dark red to dark orange. A precipitate is formed if ether is added to this solution. This will redissolve in pyridine. Impurities of the reaction products remain in the product. In this study, it was found that the solidified diatomic substance is distinct from the Wurtzite structure. The Wurtzite substance was insoluble and was decomposed by lithium iodide, but not the solidified diatomic species. Moreover, while the Wurtzite substance's decomposition is strongly base catalysed, the solidified diatomic species is not strongly affected at all. Dilts distinguishes between the two copper hydrides as the 'insoluble-' and 'soluble copper hydrides'. The soluble hydride is susceptible to pyrolysis under vacuum and proceeds to completion under 100 °C (212 °F).

Amorphous copper hydride is also produced by anhydrous reduction. In this process copper(I) and tetrahydroaluminate react to produce molecular copper hydride and triiodoaluminium adducts. The molecular copper hydride is precipitated into amorphous copper hydride with the addition of diethyl ether. Amorphous copper hydride is converted into the Wurtz phase by annealing, accompanied by some decomposition.

=== History ===
Hydridocopper was discovered in the vibration-rotation emission of a hollow-cathode lamp in 2000 by Bernath who first detected it as a contaminant while attempting to generate NeH^{+}. Molecular copper hydride has the distinction of being the first metal hydride to be detected in this way. (1,0) (2,0) and (2,1) vibrational bands were observed along with line splitting due to the presence of two copper isotopes, ^{63}Cu and ^{65}Cu.

The A^{1}Σ^{+}-X^{1}Σ^{+} absorption lines from CuH have been claimed to have been observed in sunspots and in the star 19 Piscium.

In vapour experiments, it was found that copper hydride is produced from the elements upon exposure to 310 nm radiation.

Cu + H_{2} ⇌ CuH + H^{•}

However, this proved to be unviable as a production method as the reaction is difficult to control. The activation barrier for the reverse reaction is virtually non-existent, which allows it to readily proceed even at 20 K (−253.2 °C; −423.7 °F).
