= Metal-hydride hydrogen atom transfer =

Metal-hydride hydrogen atom transfer (MHAT) is an elementary step in which a metal hydride (M–H) transfers a hydrogen atom (H•) to an alkene, forming a carbon-centered radical and a reduced metal. The carbon radical can then undergo diverse transformations.

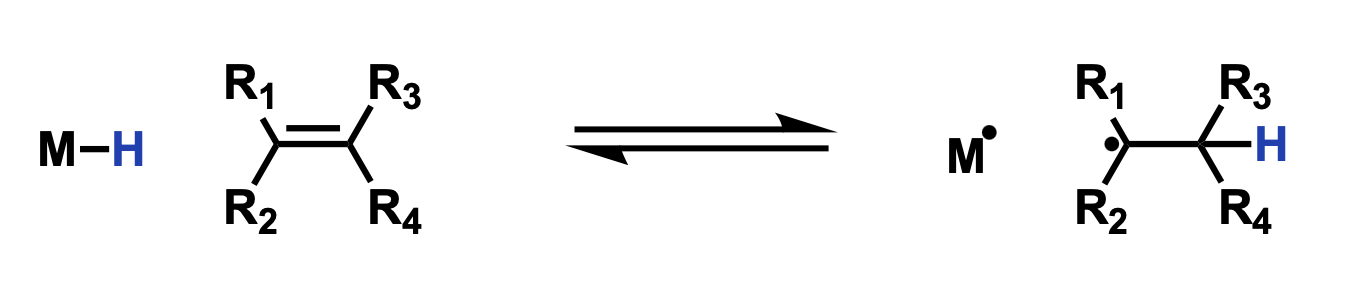

== History ==
Pioneering work by Iguchi, Winfield, Kwiatek, and Jackman demonstrated the potential for cyanocobaltate complexes to absorb hydrogen and reduce conjugated alkenes, which constituted early and noteworthy examples of catalytic homogeneous hydrogenation systems. Jackman suggested that all available data were consistent with the formation of a metal hydride that underwent bimolecular reaction with the alkene to transfer a hydrogen atom, but inconsistent with proton transfer (H+), hydride transfer (H–) or alkene coordination. Halpern showed that carbonyl metal hydrides may react similarly: H/D exchange and reduction rates of extended arenes and HCo(CO)_{4} could be predicted by radical localization energies, and α-methylstyrene reduction by HMn(CO)_{5} exhibited CIDNP effects. Together, these studies suggested that certain metal hydrides undergo outer-sphere reaction with activated olefins through a mechanism distinct from metal insertion, hydride addition, or protonation. Norton has adapted this reactivity paradigm to a series of reductions and isomerizations mediated by stable or meta-stable metal hydrides at high pressures of hydrogen. These early studies relied on medium-strength M–H bonds (>50 kcal/mol) and therefore were restricted to conjugated alkene substrates that stabilized the incipient carbon-centered radical.

MHAT has attracted increasing attention in recent years due to a proposal that a series of common reactions first reported by Drago and Mukaiyama likely involves MHAT. In contrast to the early reducing systems of Kwiatek, these recent variants likely involve very unstable (low BDE) metal hydrides supported by weak field ligands and subject to a competitive and irreversible hydrogen evolution reaction (HER). A benefit to this instabiltiy, however, is the capacity to react with polysubstituted and stable alkenes, even in very hindered environments to deliver hydrofunctionalized products chemoselectively following Markovnikov's rule. Because of its outer-sphere mechanism, MHAT tends not to be inhibited by strong Lewis bases or steric crowding, leading to widespread use in synthesis of complex molecules like natural products.

== Mechanism ==
Metal hydrides involved in Mukaiyama-like MHAT reactions are typically generated in situ from electrophilic transition metal precursors upon treatment with silanes or borohydrides as stoichiometric reductants (see Figure below adapted from Ref.). The thermodynamic driving force to form a very weak M–H bond likely arises from the formation of strong Si–O or B–O bonds, particularly under protic conditions that promote solvolysis to reactive monoalkoxysilanes. Alcoholic solvents are thus often essential for efficient activation and turnover. In this context, Ph(i‑PrO)SiH_{2} has been identified as a particularly effective silane, offering operational stability and reliable hydride delivery. Alternatively, the older systems of MHAT (see above) formed more stable metal hydrides by hydrogen gas (H_{2} splitting), disproportionation in water (water splitting) or electrochemical reduction/ protonation. Although the weak metal hydrides that react unconjugated alkenes are too unstable to be isolated, several studies on relative rates, off-cycle organometallic species and isotope labeling have led to growing consensus in the validity of the MHAT model. Contemporaneous to these studies, however, some literature still invoked free H• or non-HAT mechanisms, suggesting ongoing distrust of the MHAT proposal.

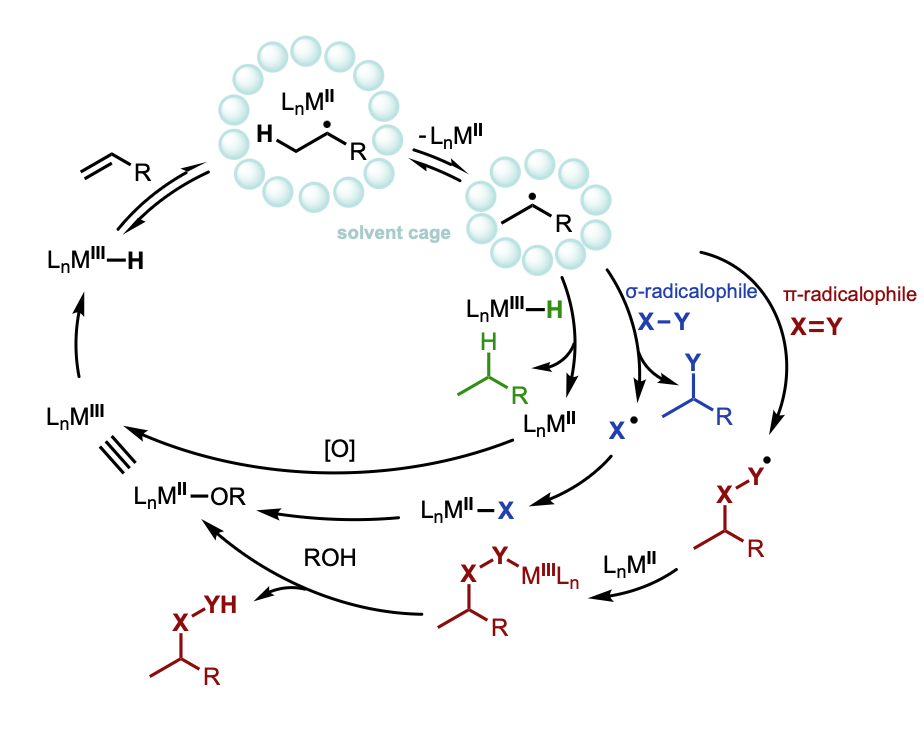

The hypothetical metal–hydride species—typically based on first-row transition metals such as Fe, Co, Mn—exhibit redox flexibility, low bond strengths, and multiple accessible spin states. These features enable hydrogen atom transfer to π-systems, generating carbon-centered radicals and transiently reduced metal species. The radical pair initially exists in a solvent cage, where it may revert, recombine, or escape to engage in productive downstream reactivity. The use of weak-field ligands promotes high-spin configurations that enhance the radical character of the M–H bond and facilitate efficient MHAT. These mechanistic features collectively distinguish MHAT from conventional hydride or proton transfer pathways, supporting its use in mild and chemoselective olefin functionalization.

== C–O bond formation ==
The MHAT mechanism can be applied retrospectively to the Mukaiyama hydration, although the original inventors did not consider this mechanistic pathway. In Shenvi's revised mechanism, the carbon radical formed after MHAT to an alkene captures triplet O_{2} or a metal superoxide; recent variants include nitroarenes as O_{2} surrogates. If the carbon radical resulting from MHAT is tertiary, the corresponding reduced metal is unlikely to capture it, whereas a secondary radical likely forms an organometallic, as in Jackman's early work. The secondary organometallic can reform a radical by reaction with O_{2}, light or heat. These radical-based processes encompass hydration, hydroalkoxylation, and hydroperoxidation, all of which occur via Markovnikov-selective addition across unactivated alkenes. Such transformations offer high chemoselectivity under mild conditions and have been increasingly applied in complex molecule synthesis.

=== Mukaiyama Hydration ===
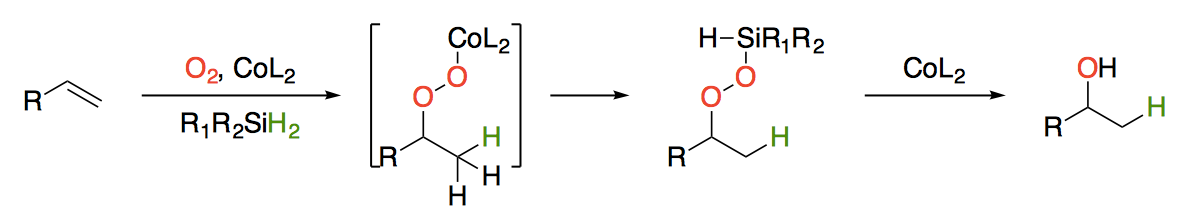

=== Mukaiyama Hydroperoxidation ===
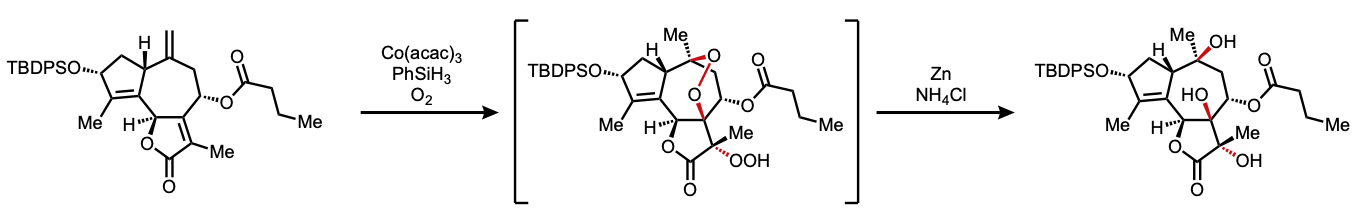

Mukaiyama hydration conditions and its variations can cause hydroperoxidation of alkenes. Maimone and co-workers reported the oxygen-stitching strategy using hydroperoxidation to efficiently construct nortrilobolide using Co(acac)_{2}. In this strategy, Mukaiyama hydroperoxidation of olefins followed by reductive workup can produce triols. In contrast to cobalt, the analogous iron and manganese catalysts were almost unreactive.

== C–N bond formation ==
MHAT-mediated C–N bond formation was also first reported by Mukaiyama using n-butyl nitrite (n-BuONO) and either Co(eobe) or Fe(acac)_{3} catalysts. However, these reactions were expanded dramatically by Carreira in seminal work that showed the broad generality of Mukaiyama's reactivity. These reactions include hydrohydrazination and hydroazidation, as well as the first examples of C–C bond formation using MHAT (see below).

=== Hydrohydrazination ===
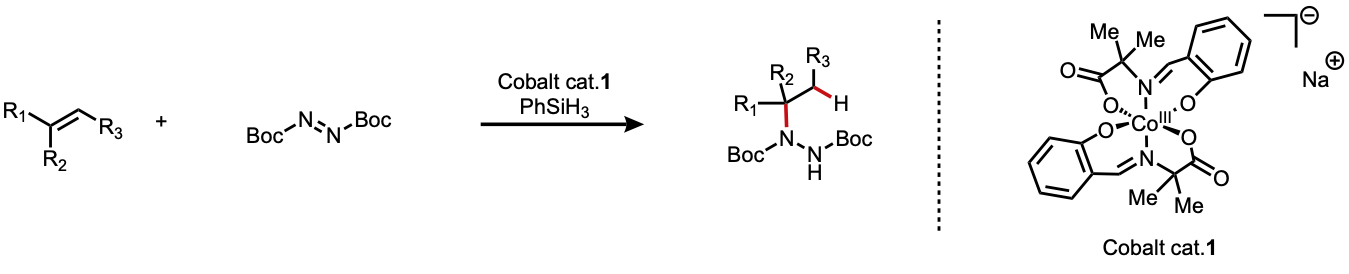

Orthogonal to the Mukaiyama system, Boger and co-workers developed an Fe(III)/NaBH_{4}-mediated hydroazidation of unactivated alkenes using NaN_{3} as the azide source. These reactions were described as distinct from the reactivity of hydridometal carbonyl complexes and with little precedent to draw upon, in contrast to the MHAT proposal. The reaction was proposed to proceed via a radical pathway, exhibits exclusive Markovnikov selectivity, and tolerates a broad range of functional groups. This method enables direct alkene azidation, facilitating access to previously inaccessible C20′-vinblastine analogues.

=== Hydroazidation ===
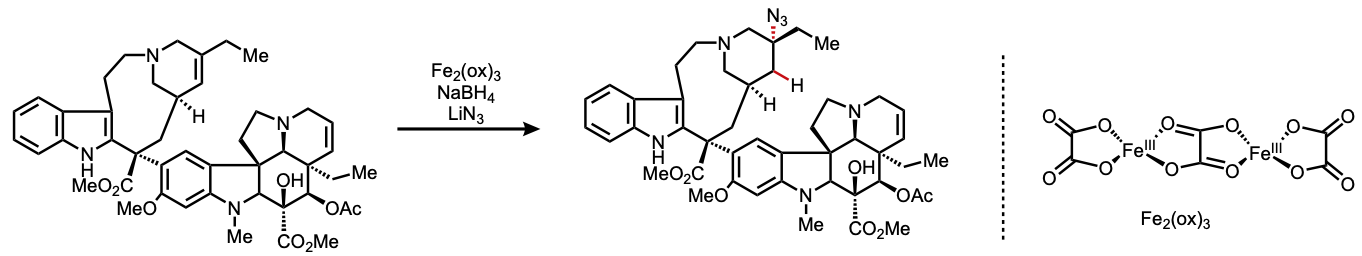

== C–X bond formation ==
MHAT-mediated C–X bond formation proceeds via radical interception of alkenes with electrophilic halogen or chalcogen sources. In addition to C–F bond formation, MHAT enables hydrohalogenation and hydrochalcogenation under mild, chemoselective conditions, as demonstrated with Cl, Br, I, and S-based reagents.

=== Hydrofluorination ===
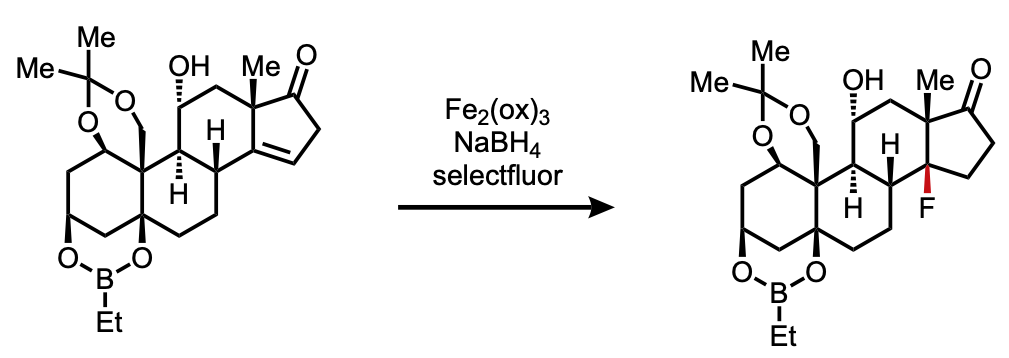

Boger and co-workers further expanded Fe(III)/NaBH_{4} system to free radical hydrofluorination of unactivated alkenes using Selectfluor reagent as a source of fluorine and resulting in exclusive Markovnikov addition. Baran and co-workers applied this reaction to introduce a fluorine atom to an unactivated alkene in a steroid derivative.

== C–C bond formation ==
MHAT-mediated C–C bond formation involves the capture carbon-centered radicals by cyanation, oximation, or conjugate addition (Giese addition), which adapt Mukaiyama-type reactions to classic radical traps, including radical-olefin cyclization. Alternatively, MHAT catalytic cycles operate in concert with nickel catalytic cycles, changing the normal linear selectivity of coordinative cross-couplings to the branched selectivity of MHAT, yielding Markovnikov-selective hydroarylations and hydroalkylations. These dual catalyst reactions can be replaced with single catalysts that mediate multiple different elementary steps, for example, a single iron catalyst that effects MHAT, S_{H}2 and SET, leading to alkene hydrobenzylation, for example.

=== Conjugate addition ===
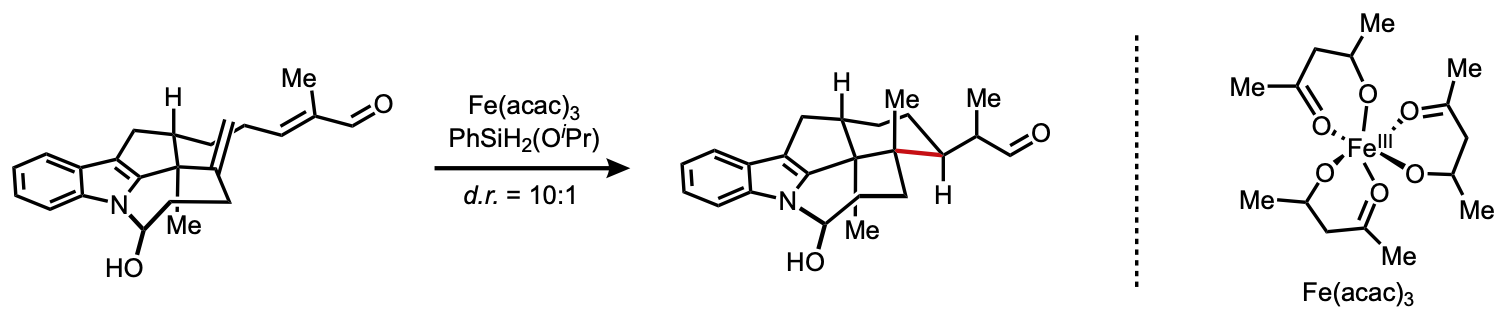

MHAT reactions are used widely in complex synthesis, especially natural products synthesis. Pronin and co-workers were early adapters of MHAT in annulation reactions, applying RubenSilane and iron catalysis to synthesize (±)-emindole SB.

=== Hydroarylation ===
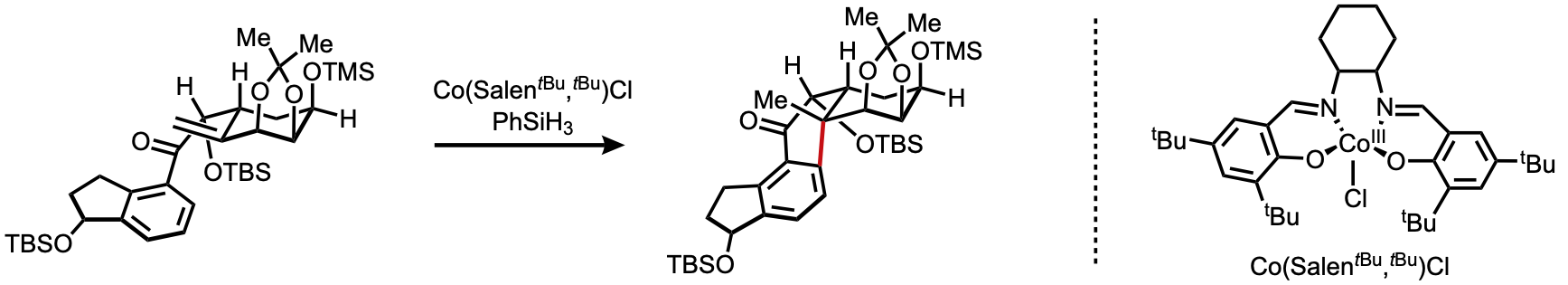

In 2019, Gao and co-workers applied Shenvi isomerization to the construction of the tetracyclic core of viridin-type aromatic steroids, highly oxygenated furanosteroids that function as potent PI3K inhibitors, demonstrating the method's utility in assembling biologically active, densely functionalized polycyclic frameworks.

=== Reductive coupling ===
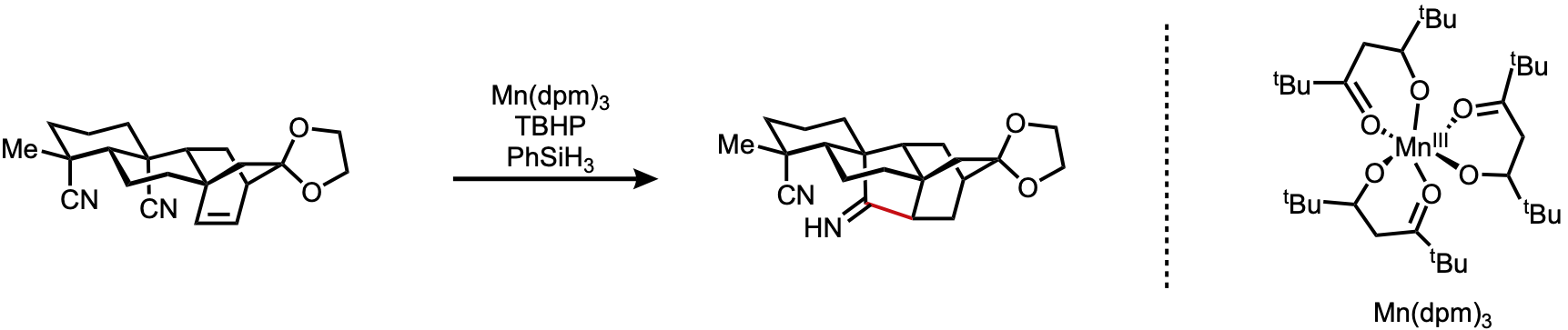

Analogy can be drawn between non-coordinative MHAT reactions and the alternative, coordinative reactions of Krische and co-workers, insofar as both categories of reactions result in net reduction of the substrate(s). In 2018, Ma and co-workers expanded the scope of reductive coupling in the synthesis of navirine C, which features a surprisingly regioselective MHAT reaction, followed by radical addition to the proximal nitrile.

== Hydrogenation ==
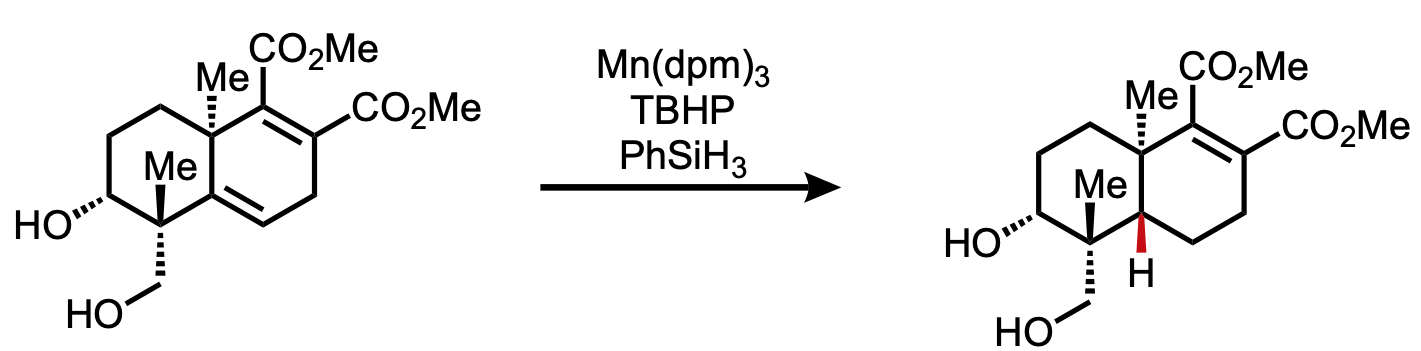

MHAT-based hydrogenation represents a mechanistically distinct alternative to classical hydrogenation via metal dihydrides. Krische was an early adaptor of MHAT hydrogenation for the synthesis of oridamycin A, triptoquinone B and C and isoiresin. Key features of MHAT hydrogenation (also called Shenvi hydrogenation) include 1) frequent preference for a thermodynamically preferred diastereomer due to intermediate radical pyramidalization, 2) tolerance for hindered, unactivated alkenes, and 3) the ability to reduce haloalkenes to haloalkanes.

== Isomerization ==
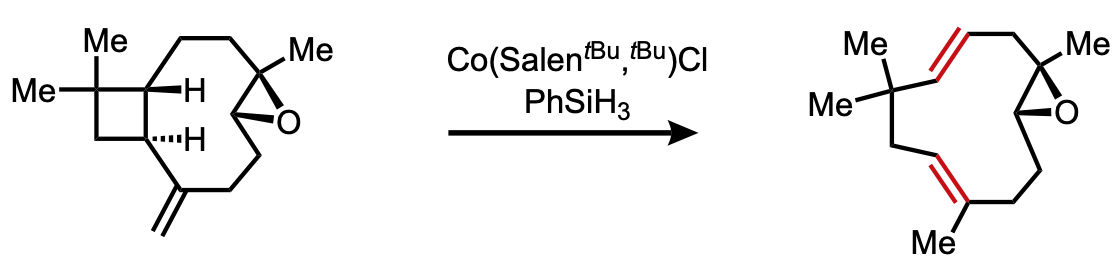

MHAT-based isomerization complements the many coordinative methods for alkene isomerization but benefits from its outer-sphere mechanism so that strong Lewis bases like tertiary amines do not affect catalysis. Cobalt catalyzed MHAT isomerization has been employed to isomerize terminal alkenes to internal ones, for example, in the synthesis of (−)-humulene oxide II.

== See also ==
- Markovnikov's rule
- Hydrogen atom abstraction
- Mukaiyama hydration
- Hydrogenation
