= Hydrocupration =

Chemical reaction

A hydrocupration is a chemical reaction whereby a ligated copper hydride species (Cu(I)H), reacts with a carbon-carbon or carbon-oxygen pi-system; this insertion is typically thought to occur via a four-membered ring transition state, producing a new copper-carbon or copper-oxygen sigma-bond and a stable (generally) carbon-hydrogen sigma-bond. In the latter instance (copper-oxygen), protonation (protodemetalation) is typical – the former (copper-carbon) has broad utility. The generated copper-carbon bond (organocuprate) has been employed in various nucleophilic additions to polar conjugated and non-conjugated systems and has also been used to forge (by way of reductive elimination or transmetalation) new carbon-heteroatom bonds (Nitrogen, Boron, etc.).

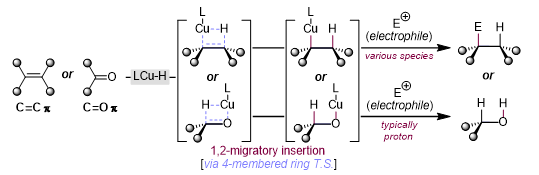

== History ==
While copper (I) hydride was the earliest known binary metal hydride (1800s), synthetic organic chemist’s interest in the reactivity of copper hydride complexes did not arise until nearly a century later; this interest came in the form of the now broadly utilized Stryker’s reagent (PPh3-modified CuH Hexamer) to affect hydrocuprations of unsaturated ketones – resulting in either 1,4 or 1,2 reduction (see Copper hydride, Stryker's reagent). While the discussed reactivity is still heavily utilized, hydrocupration has recently (early 21st century) been popularized in olefin functionalizations.

== Synthetic applications ==
=== General catalytic utility ===
Many reactions utilizing ligated copper (I) hydride to functionalize olefins have been rendered catalytic and/or enantioselective. The scheme below details, in a generic sense, the catalytic cycle for popularized reactions in this realm – and, how they’ve been hypothesized to proceed. As it pertains to copper hydride-mediated hydroboration, after 1,2-migratory insertion (M.I.), a transmetalation can take place with pinacolborane (HBPin) to produce the hydroborated product and regenerate ligated copper (I) hydride.

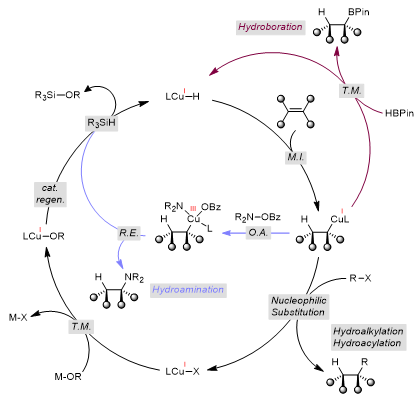

For hydroalkylations (and hydroacylations), the generated organocuprate (after initial migratory insertion) can perform nucleophilic substitution chemistry (SN2) with alkyl halides, carbonyls, and various other classical electrophiles; in this instance (and in the case of reactivity with an alkyl halide) a copper (I) halide salt is produced, which upon transmetalation with a metalated alkoxide additive produces a more thermodynamically stable metal halide salt and a copper (I) alkoxide. The latter species can undergo a final transmetalation with an alkyl hydrosilane (stoichiometric) to regenerate the active ligated copper (I) hydride catalyst and a thermodynamically stable silanol.

For hydroaminations, ligated copper (I) hydride undergoes a 1,2 migratory insertion; the resulting organocuprate can be reacted with an appropriate electrophilic amine source (such as the O-benzoylated hydroxylamine shown) to produce a highly energetic copper (III) intermediate. Reductive elimination between the carbon and nitrogen (forming C-N) produces the hydroaminated product along with a copper (I) alkoxide – which, similarly to the case of hydroalkylations/acylations, can undergo further transmetalation with an alkyl hydrosilane to regenerate the active ligated copper (I) hydride species. Alternative hypotheses to the amination step involve direct displacement or transmetalation, versus an oxidative addition to the polarized hydroxylamine.

=== Enantio- and regioselective CuH-catalyzed hydroamination of alkenes ===
In 2013, the Buchwald group reported a copper-catalyzed hydroamination method for synthesizing chiral tertiary amines; similar work was disclosed by the Miura group (Osaka University) in the same year. For about a decade, the group had published numerous papers employing ligated copper (I) hydride in 1,4-reductions of polar, conjugated systems – they postulated that their experience in performing this chemistry served as a platform for the hydroamination of alkenes shown.

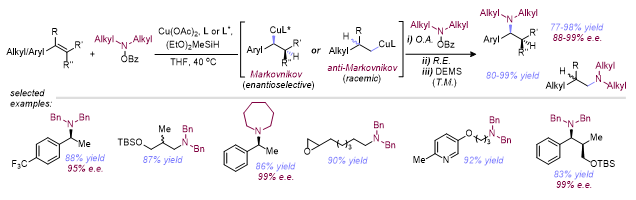

In the case of activated olefins (styrenyl-), the group observed markovnikov selectivity (presumably due to the stronger carbon-hydrogen bond formed simultaneously) and were able to render the reaction enantioselective through the utility of a chiral ligand (DTBM-SEGPHOS). For unactivated (aliphatic alkenes), the group observed anti-markovnikov selectivity exclusively – which, they theorize to be the result of a hydride migration from the copper catalyst to form the less sterically crowded terminal copper intermediate, where there is no electronic advantage as for styrenes to form the secondary alkyl-Cu intermediate; these reactions, at least in this initial publication, were not able to be rendered enantioselective. Notably, in subsequent publications the group has further diversified and improved this chemistry – where they’ve been able to render the aliphatic alkene reactions enantioselective, vary the electrophilic amine source, and broaden the substrate scope even further.

=== Enantioselective synthesis of carbo- and heterocycles through a CuH-catalyzed hydroalkylation approach ===
In 2015, the Buchwald group reported a copper-catalyzed enantioselective hydroalkylation of bromide tethered styrenyl-type olefins. The synthesis of a variety of 4-, 5-, and 6-membered rings are reported – some of which are featured prominently in biologically active natural products and pharmaceuticals (substituted cyclobutanes, cyclopentanes, indanes, and saturated heterocycles). Notably, competitive reduction of the alkyl halide by copper hydride was not observed under the optimized conditions – being a remarkable display of ligated copper (I) hydride’s chemoselectivity.

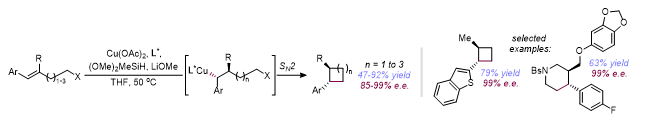

=== Synthesis of pyrroles through the coupling of enynes and nitriles ===
In 2020, the Buchwald group developed a copper-catalyzed enyne-nitrile coupling reaction – which, utilizes readily available building blocks to synthesize polysubstituted pyrroles. Notably, this discovery stemmed from the group’s pursuit of performing intermolecular hydroacylations with hydrocuprated materials – the first examples being with ketones and aldehydes; employing nitriles resulted in pyrrole formation. While there is a pre-existing array of literature pertaining to polysubstituted pyrrole synthesis, the reported methodology allows for unique and modular retrosynthetic disconnections which differ from traditional condensation or substitution approaches to similar molecules.

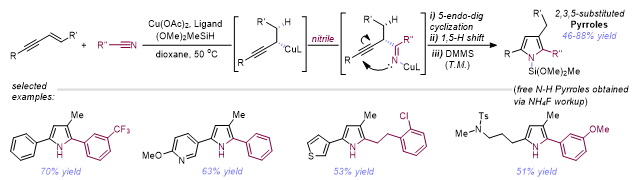
