= MHAT =

MHAT may refer to:

- Moscow Art Theatre, also known as Moskovskiy Hudojestvenny Akademicheskiy Teatr (MHAT)
- Metal-hydride hydrogen atom transfer
