= Lanthanocene =

Class of chemical compounds

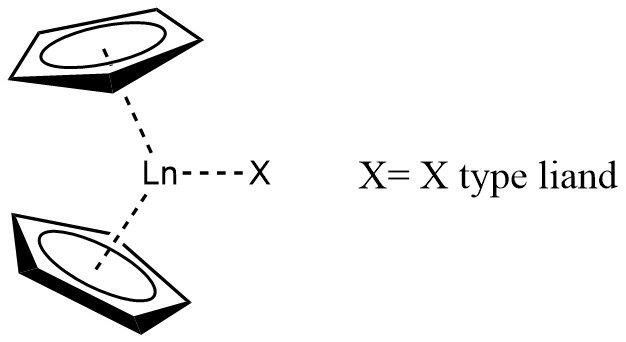
General chemical structure of a lanthanocene

A lanthanocene is a type of metallocene compound that contains an element from the lanthanide series. The most common lanthanocene complexes contain two cyclopentadienyl anions and an X type ligand, usually hydride or alkyl ligand.

== History ==
In 1954, Wilkinson and Birmingham described the tris(cyclopentadienyl)lanthanide complex, Ln(C_{5}H_{5})_{3} (Ln = La, Ce, Pr, Nd, Sm). However, due to the highly moisture and oxygen sensitive character of organolanthanide compounds, as well as the incapability of the separation of simple alkyl and aryl derivatives of the type LnR_{3}, this area of organometallic chemistry experienced a period of relative stagnation for two decades before lanthanocene complexes were prepared for some of the later lanthanides (Ln = Gd, Er, Yb, Lu).

== Synthesis ==
The synthesis part will focus on lanthanide(III) metallocene complexes that contain Ln-C bonds, which are widely prepared from the corresponding Ln-Cl precursors as shown.

(C_{5}H_{5})_{2}LnCl(THF) + LiR → (C_{5}H_{5})_{2}LnR(THF) + LiCl

Ln = Y, Nd, Sm, Dy, Er, Tm, Yb, Lu
R = Me, Et, iPr, nBu, tBu, CH2tBu, CH_{2}SiMe_{3}, CH_{2}Ph, Ph, C_{6}H_{4}Me^{−}p

The synthetic route leading to lanthanocene chlorides are summarized:

LnCl_{3} + 2 MC_{5}H_{5} → (C_{5}H_{5})_{2}LnCl + 2 MCl

M = Na, Ti

Ln(C_{5}H_{5})_{3} + NH_{4}Cl → (C_{5}H_{5})_{2}LnCl + C_{5}H_{6} + NH_{3}
Ln(C_{5}H_{5})_{3} + HCl → (C_{5}H_{5})_{2}LnCl + C_{5}H_{6}

== Reactions ==
With the large 4f orbitals, lanthanide elements display properties significantly different from the common d-block transition metals. The large ionic radii limits the extent to which 4f orbitals can overlap with ligands, but at the same time allows the organolanthanide complexes to attain higher coordination numbers. As such, cyclopentadienyl anions (abbreviated Cp) are typically used to occupy the unsaturated site as well as stabilize the metal complex. Some of the alkyl and hydride lanthanocene complexes exhibit unique activities towards C-H bond activation, alkene functionalization, and carbonyl activation.

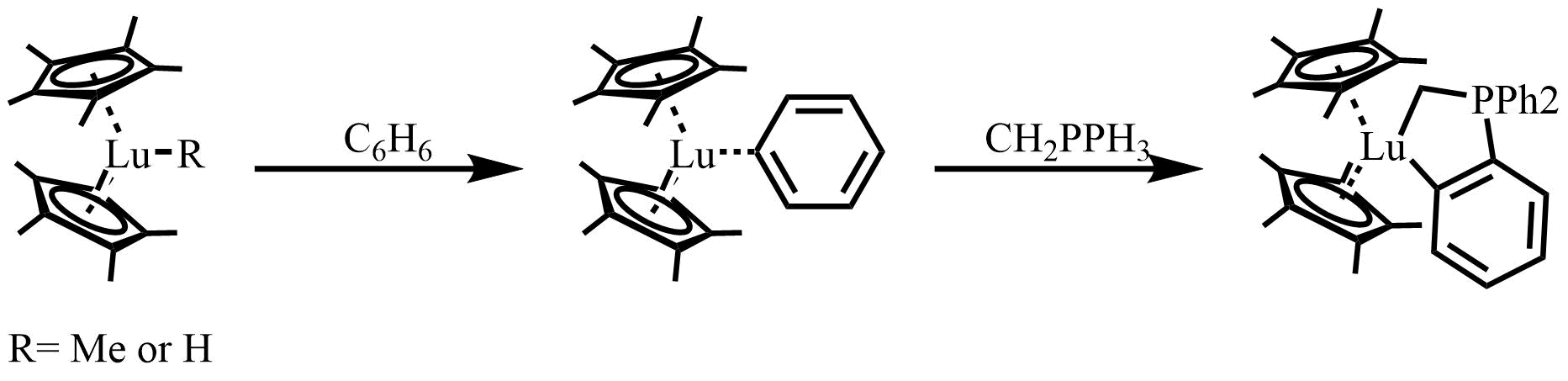

In 1983, Watson reported one of the first lanthanocene catalyzed C-H bond activation reactions. The active catalysts are lutetium-methyl or lutetium-hydride complexes, which react at room temperature in hydrocarbon solvents with benzene, pyridine, and the ylide CH_{2}PPh_{3} to give stable, isolatable products.

Studies have shown that organolanthanides are extraordinary catalysts for hydrofunctionalization reactions including hydrogenation, hydrosilylation, hydroboration, hydroamination, etc. Examples for each type have shown below.

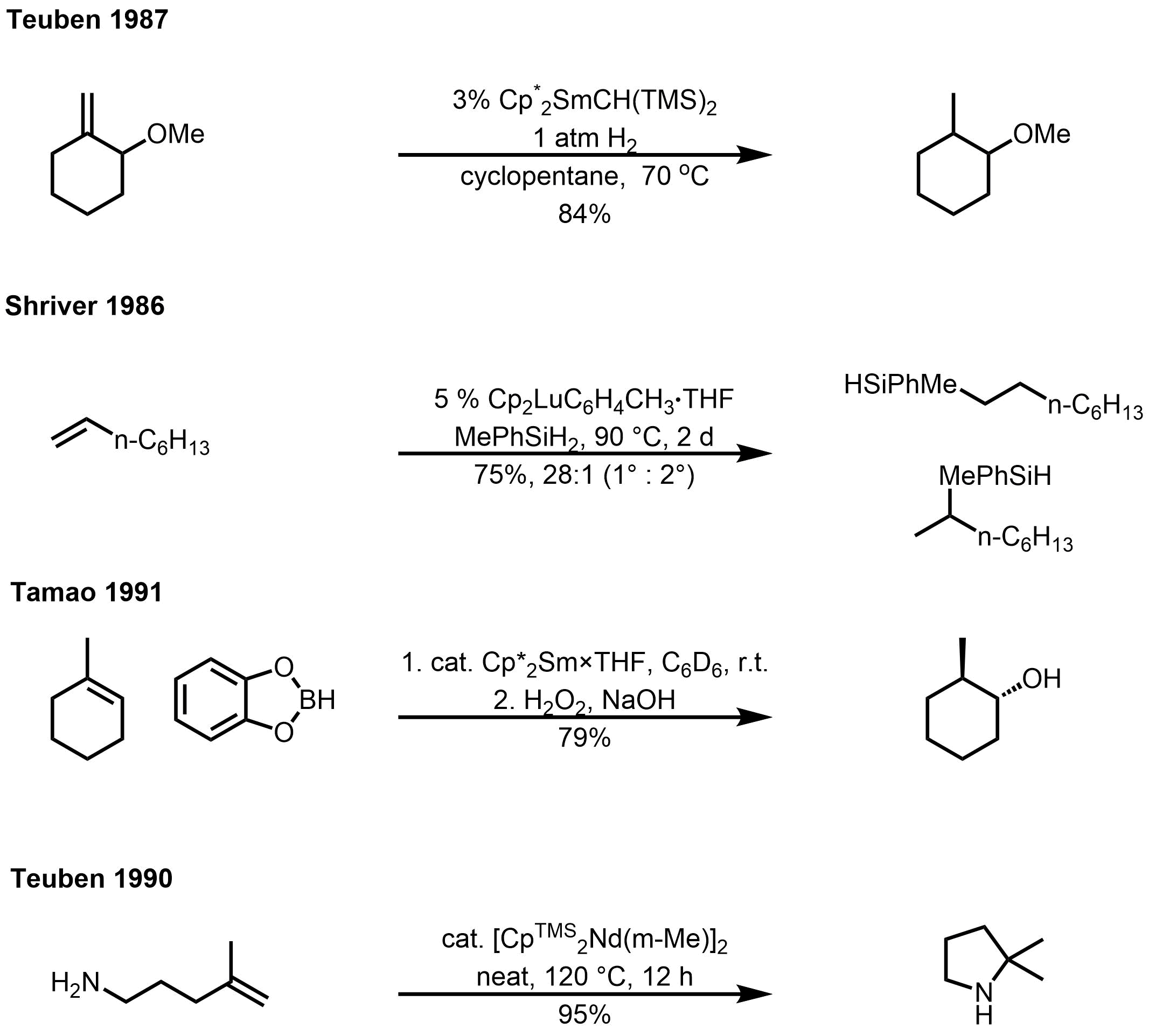

Mechanism for hydrogenation is shown below, where the active catalyst is generated by sigma-bond metathesis, followed by olefin insertion and another sigma-bond metathesis to regenerate the catalyst. This is also the mechanism for other hydrofunctionalization.

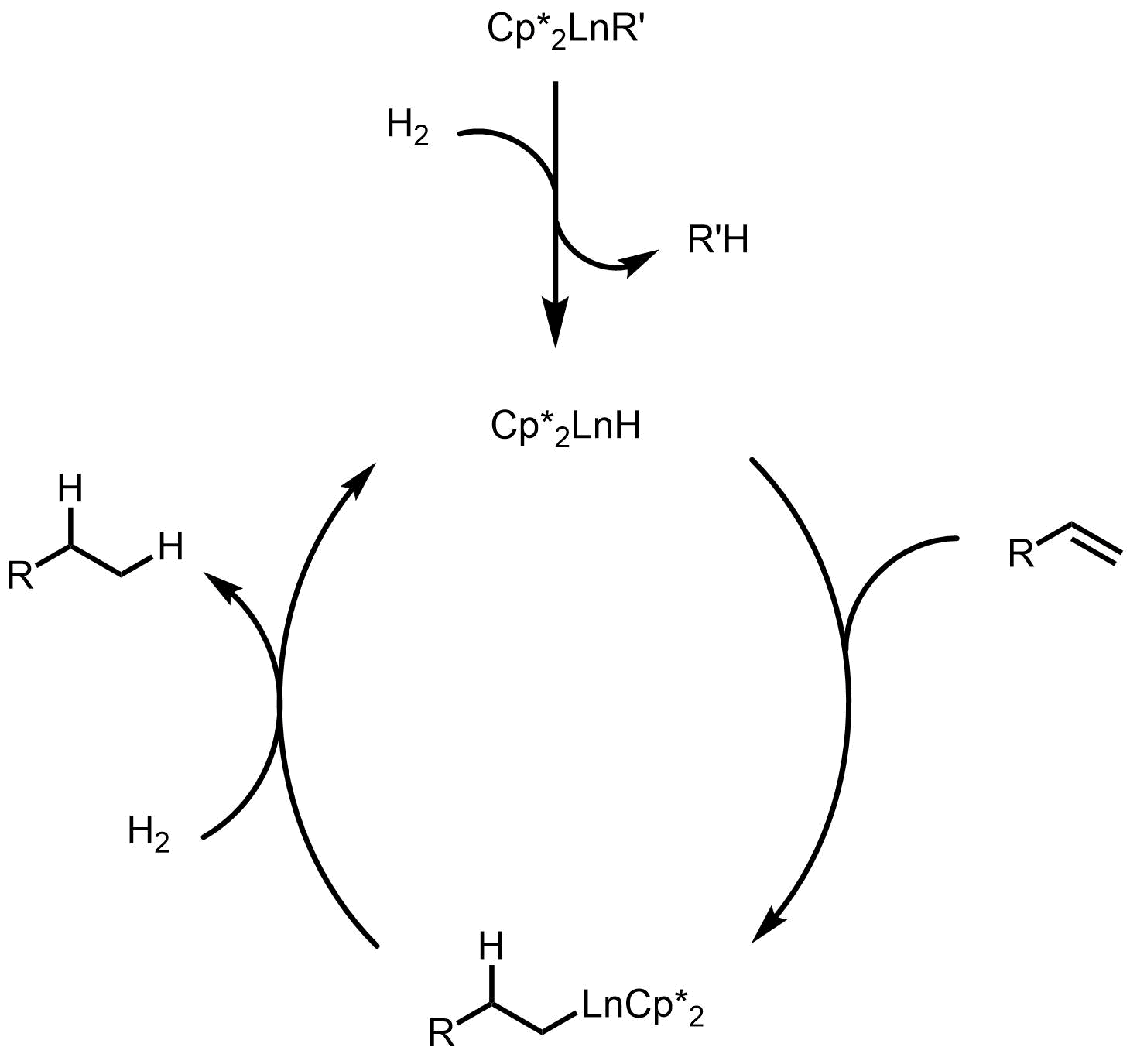

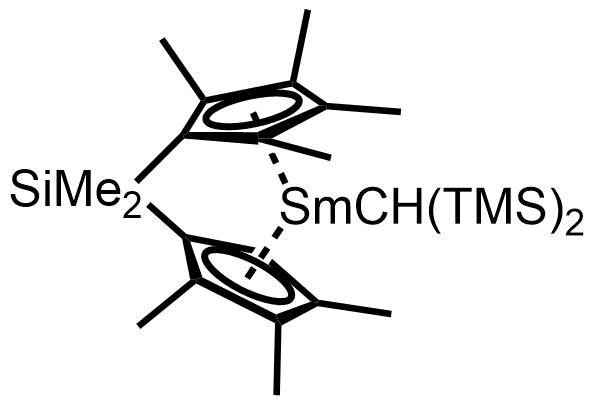

Yet, as the large cyclopentadienyl ligand hinders the metal center, reactions with substituted alkenes are inhibited. Two general methods are used to overcome this difficulty. One is to increase the size of metal by incorporating lanthanides with larger ionic radii. Due to the lanthanide contraction, this means replacing the late lanthanides with the early lanthanides. Another method is to decrease the size of the ligand by manipulating the geometry of ligands and substitutions on ligands. For example, a hinged or ansa-bridged cyclopentadienyl ligand could be used to pull ligands closer to each other, and hence creating more open access to the metal center as shown on the right.

== See also ==
- Actinocene
