= Mukaiyama hydration =

Chemical reaction

The Mukaiyama hydration is an organic reaction involving formal addition of an equivalent of water across an olefin by the action of catalytic bis(acetylacetonato)cobalt(II) complex, phenylsilane and atmospheric oxygen to produce an alcohol with Markovnikov selectivity:

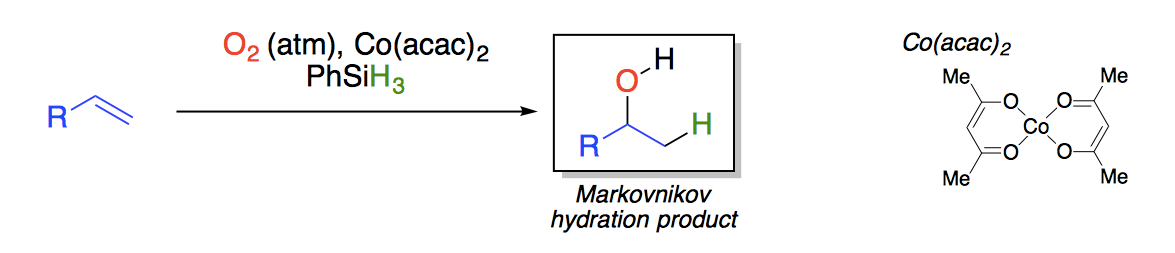
General scheme of Mukaiyama hydration

The reaction was developed by Teruaki Mukaiyama at Mitsui Petrochemical Industries, Ltd. The discovery was based on previous work on the selective hydrations of olefins catalyzed by cobalt complexes with Schiff base and porphyrin ligands.

Due to its chemoselectivity (tolerant of other functional groups) and mild reactions conditions (run under air at room temperature), the Mukaiyama hydration has become a valuable tool in chemical synthesis. Variations include the use of other radical oxidants or other metal centers (e.g., Mn, Fe).

== Mechanism ==
In his original publication, Mukaiyama proposed that the reaction proceeded through the intermediacy of a cobalt peroxide adduct. A metal exchange reaction between a hydrosilane and the cobalt peroxide adduct leads to a silyl peroxide, which is converted to the alcohol upon reduction, presumably via action of the cobalt catalyst.

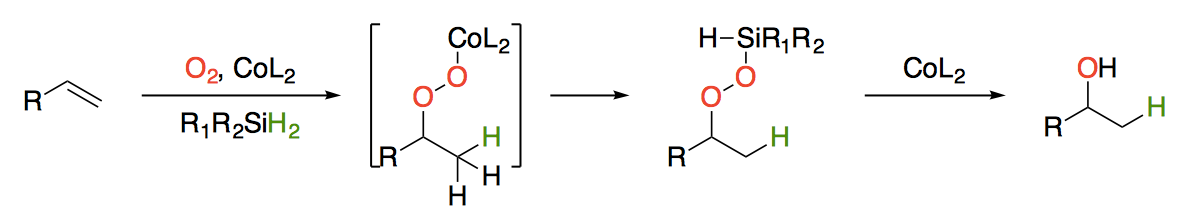
mukaiyama scheme

Studies investigating the mechanism of cobalt-catalyzed peroxidation of alkenes by Nojima and coworkers, support the intermediacy of a metal hydride that reacts with the alkene directly to form a transient cobalt-alkyl bond. Homolysis generates a carbon centered radical that reacts directly with oxygen and is subsequently trapped by a cobalt(II) species to form the same cobalt-peroxide adduct as suggested by Mukaiyama. Metal exchange with the hydrosilane produces a silyl peroxide product and further reduction (via homolysis of the oxygen-oxygen bond) leads to the product alcohol. The use of a silane reductant allows for this reaction to be carried out without heat. The authors also note, in accordance with previous studies, that the addition of t-butylhydroperoxide can increase the rate of slower-reacting substrates. This rate increase is likely due to oxidation of cobalt(II) to alkylperoxo-cobalt(III) complex, which subsequently participates in a rapid metal exchange with the hydrosilane to generate the active cobalt(III)-hydride.

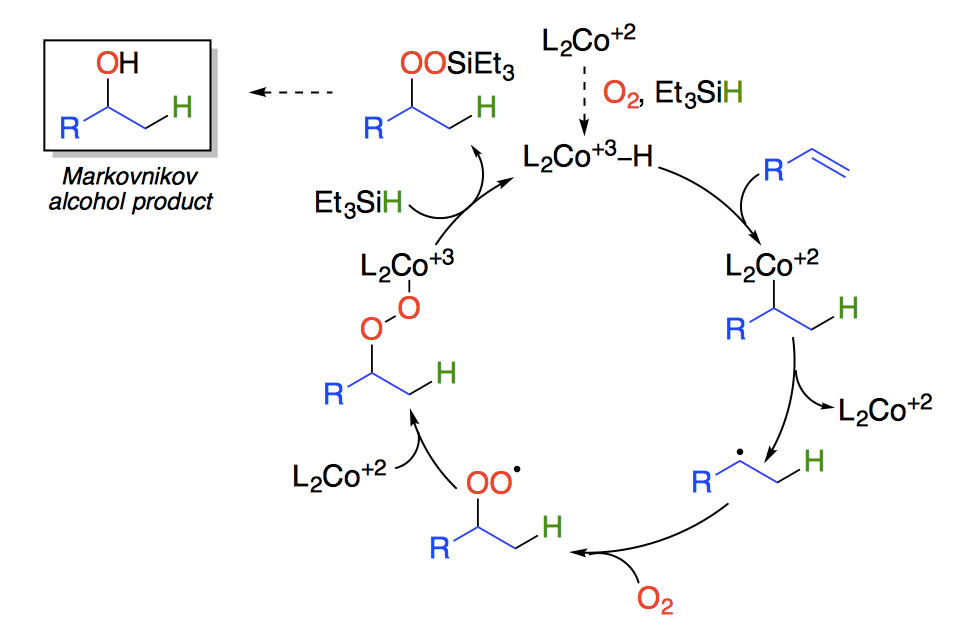
Proposed catalytic cycle based on work by Nojima

The mechanism laid out above is in marked contrast to previous mechanistic proposals, which suggest that a cobalt-peroxy complex inserts directly into alkenes. The aforementioned study by Nojima and coworkers disagrees with this proposal due to three observations: 1) the intermediacy of a cobalt-hydride observed via ^{1}H NMR 2) the propensity of alkenes to undergo autooxidation to the α, β-unsaturated ketones or allylic alcohols when the same reaction is run in the absence of a hydrosilane 3) the predominant mode of decomposition of alkylperoxo-cobalt(III) species to an alkoxy or alkylperoxy radical via the Haber–Weiss mechanism.

A recent review by Shenvi and coworkers, proposed that the Mukaiyama hydration operates via the same principles as metal hydride hydrogen atom transfer (MH HAT), elucidated by Jack Halpern and Jack R. Norton in their studies on hydrogenation of anthracenes by syngas and Co_{2}(CO)_{8} and the chemistry of vitamin B_{12} mimics, respectively.

== Variations ==
=== Carbon-oxygen bond formation ===
Yamada explored the effect of different solvents and cobalt beta-diketonate ligands on the yield and product distribution of the reaction.

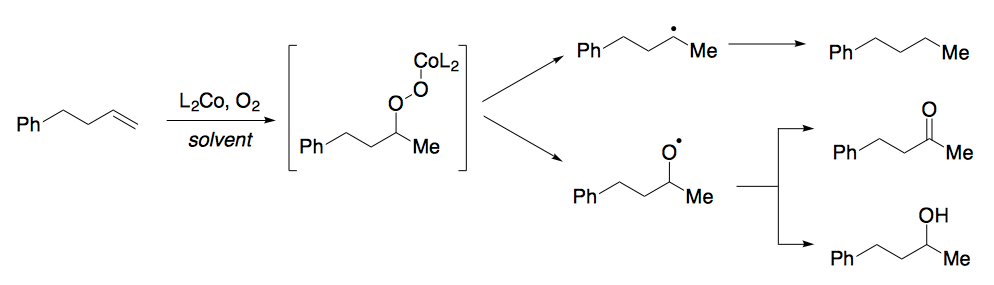
yamada-stuff

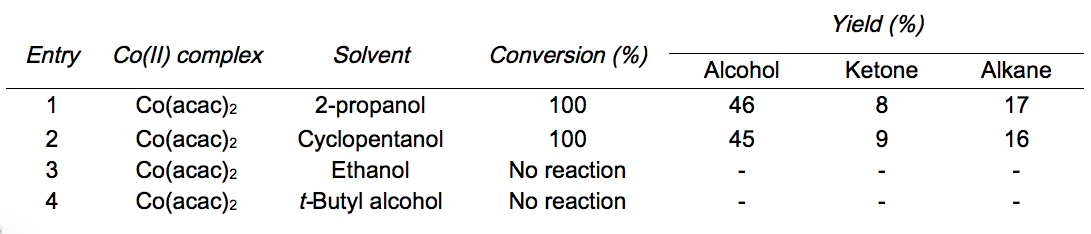
table of solvents

Mukaiyama and Isayama developed conditions to isolate the intermediate silylperoxide. Treatment of the intermediate silylperoxide with 1 drop of concentrated HCl in methanol leads to the hydroperoxide product.

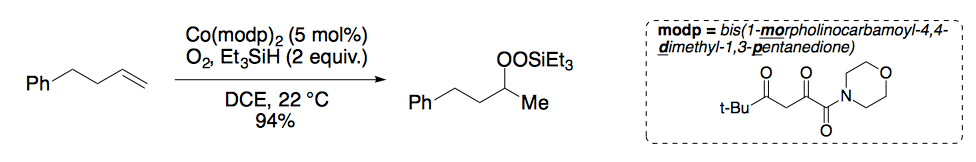
Isayama's work with modp ligand detailed

Both Mukaiyama and Magnus describe conditions for an α-enone hydroxylation reaction using Mn(dpm)_{x} in the presence of oxygen and phenylsilane. An asymmetric variant was described by Yamada and coworkers.

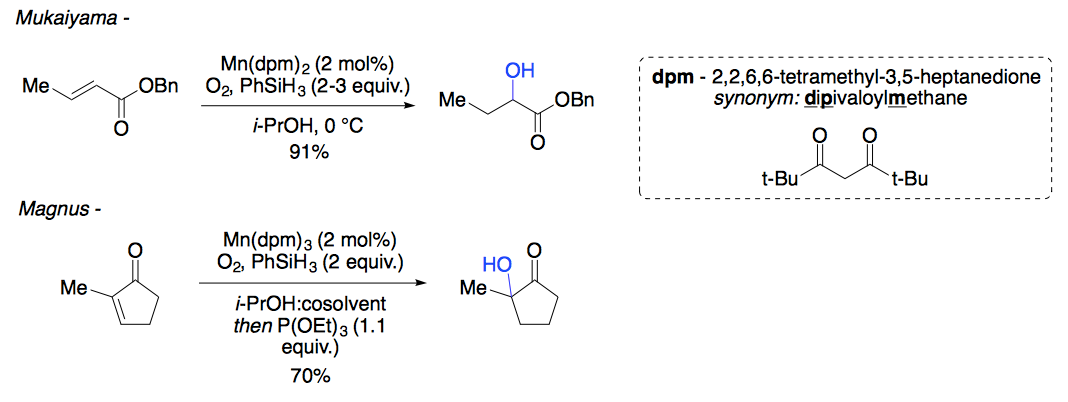
Mukaiyama and magnus alpha hydroxylation

Dale Boger and coworkers used a variant of the Mukaiyama hydration, utilizing an iron oxalate catalyst (Fe_{2}ox_{3}•6H_{2}O) in the presence of air, for the total synthesis of vinblastine and related analogs.

=== Carbon-nitrogen bond formation ===
Erick Carreira’s group has developed both cobalt and manganese-catalyzed methods for the hydrohydrazination of olefins.

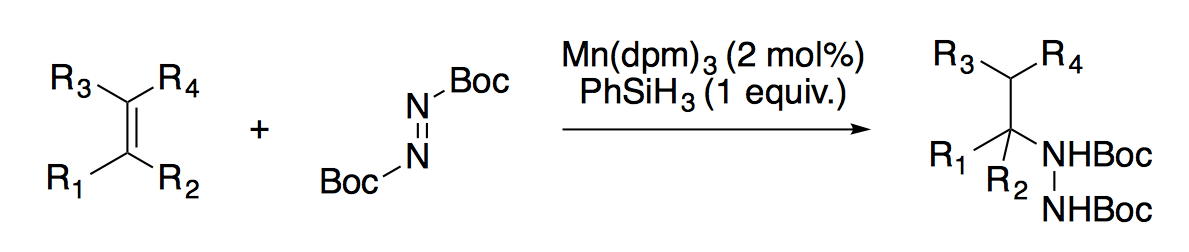
Carreira's manganese-catalyzed hydrohydrazination reaction

Both Carreira and Boger have developed hydroazidation reactions.

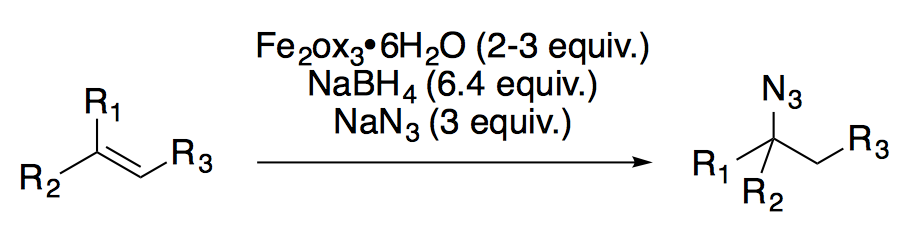
The iron-catalyzed hydroazidation of substituted alkene published by Boger

== Applications ==
=== In total synthesis ===
The Mukaiyama hydration or variants thereof have been featured in the syntheses of (±)-garsubellin A, stigmalone, vinblastine, (±)-cortistatin A, (±)-lahadinine B, ouabagenin, pectenotoxin-2, (±)-indoxamycin B, trichodermatide A, (+)-omphadiol and many more natural products.

In the following diagram, an application of the Mukaiyama hydration in the total synthesis of (±)-garsubellin A is illustrated:

Application of mukaiyama hydration in the total synthesis of (±)-Garsubellin A

The hydration reaction is catalyzed by Co(acac)2 (acac = 2,4-pentanedionato, better known as acetylacetonato) and carried out in the presence of air oxygen & phenylsilane. With isopropanol used as solvent, yields of 73 % are obtained.

== See also ==
- Hydration reaction
- Oxymercuration-reduction
- Hydroboration-oxidation reaction
