= Hydroalkoxylation =

Type of organic chemical reaction

Hydroalkoxylation is a chemical reaction that combines alcohols with alkenes or alkynes. The process affords ethers.

The reaction converts alkenes to dialkyl or aryl-alkyl ethers:

R'OH + RCH=CH_{2} → R'OCH(R)-CH_{3}

Similarly, alkynes are converted to vinyl ethers:

R'OH + RC≡CH → R'OC(R)=CH_{2}

As shown, the reaction follows the Markovnikov rule. The process exhibits good atom-economy in the sense that no byproducts are produced. The reaction is catalyzed by bases and also by transition metal complexes. Usually symmetrical ethers are prepared by dehydration of alcohols and unsymmetrical ethers by the Williamson ether synthesis from alkyl halides and alkali metal alkoxides.

== See also ==
- Hydroamination
- Hydrofunctionalization
