= Hydrofunctionalization =

A hydrofunctionalization reaction is the addition of hydrogen and another univalent fragment (X) across a carbon-carbon or carbon-heteroatom multiple bond. Often, the term hydrofunctionalization without modifier refers specifically to the use of the covalent hydride (H-X) as the source of hydrogen and X for this transformation. If other reagents are used to achieve the net addition of hydrogen and X across a multiple bond, the process may be referred to as a formal hydrofunctionalization.

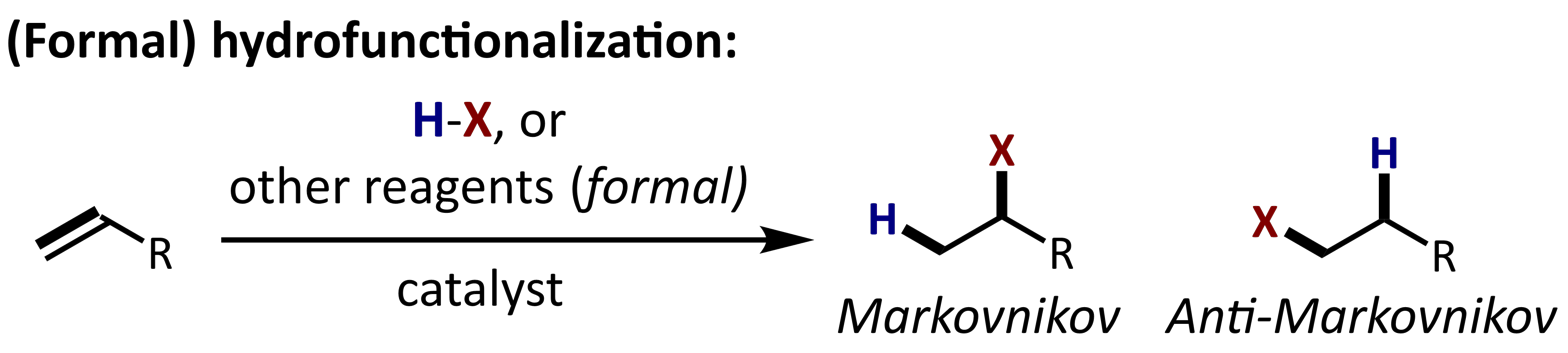
Generic hydrofunctionalization reaction.

For terminal olefins (or acetylenes), the regioselectivity of the process can be described as Markovnikov (addition of X at the substituted end) or anti-Markovnikov (addition of X at the unsubstituted end). Catalysts are frequently employed to control the chemo-, regio-, and stereoselectivity of hydrofunctionalization reactions.

== Examples ==
Some of the better known classes of hydrofunctionalization reactions include the following:

- Hydroboration
- Hydrosilylation
- Hydrometalation (including both transition or main group metal hydrides)
- Hydroamination
- (Olefin) hydration (addition of H_{2}O across a double bond)
- Hydroalkoxylation (also known as hydroetherification)
- Hydrohalogenation
- Hydrovinylation (including hydroarylation and olefin dimerization and others)
- Hydroacylation
- Hydroformylation (refers specifically to the addition of CHO and H using H_{2} and CO as reagents, also known as the oxo process)
