= Jack R. Norton =

American organometallic chemist

Jack Richard Norton
- Born: Dallas, Texas
- Education: Harvard (B.A.), Stanford (Ph.D.)
- Known for: Transition-metal hydrides
- Awards: ACS Award in Organometallic Chemistry (2005); Cope Scholar Award (2012)
- Scientific career
- Fields: Chemistry (catalysis, mechanistic organometallic chemistry, physical organic chemistry, chemical kinetics)
- Workplaces: Columbia University
- Doctoral advisor: James P. Collman (chemist)

Jack Richard Norton (born May 5, 1945) is an American organometallic chemist and Professor at Columbia University. His research has focused on the studying the reactivity and properties of transition metal hydrides. He coauthored the textbook "Principles and Applications of Organotransition Metal Chemistry."

== Education and career ==
Norton was born in Dallas, Texas in 1945. He received his B.A. from Harvard University in 1967 and was awarded his Ph.D. at Stanford in 1972 under the mentorship of James P. Collman. After a postdoctoral appointment with Jack Lewis, he was appointed assistant professor at Princeton University. He moved to Colorado State University in 1979, and again to Columbia University in 1997, where he remains Professor of Chemistry. From 1992-2003 he was an associate editor of Journal of the American Chemical Society

His laboratory demonstrated the possibility of dinuclear reductive elimination from transition metal alkyls and hydrides by comparing the mechanisms of reductive elimination from (H)_{2}Os(CO)_{4}, (H)(CH_{3})Os(CO)_{4}, and (CH_{3})_{2}Os(CO)_{4}. His group later reported some of the first detailed pK_{a} measurements of metal hydrides and demonstrated that the rates of protonation at transition metals can be quite slow. His group has also reported on the use of metal-hydride bonds as radical initiators of cyclization reactions.

In 2005 he received the ACS Award for Organometallic Chemistry and in 2013 the Cope Scholar Award
