= Dale L. Boger =

American organic chemist

Dale Lester Boger
- Born: August 22, 1953 (age 73); Hutchinson, Kansas
- Education: University of Kansas, Harvard University
- Scientific career
- Workplaces: The Scripps Research Institute
- Doctoral advisor: E. J. Corey

Dale Lester Boger is an American medicinal and organic chemist and former chair of the Department of Chemistry at The Scripps Research Institute in La Jolla, CA.

Dale Boger was born on August 22, 1953, in Hutchinson, Kansas. He studied chemistry at the University of Kansas (B.S., 1975), and received his Ph.D. from Harvard University in 1980 under Professor E. J. Corey. Following graduate school, he joined the faculty at the University of Kansas where he became assistant/associate professor of medicinal chemistry (1979–1985).

In 1985, he started at Purdue University, where he was professor of chemistry (1985–1991). He is Richard and Alice Cramer Professor of Chemistry and member of the Skaggs Institute for Chemical Biology at The Scripps Research Institute.

Boger is active in the field of organic chemistry with research interests including natural product synthesis, synthetic methodology, medicinal chemistry, and combinatorial chemistry. He is also the author of a popular book on synthetic organic chemistry: Modern Organic Synthesis Lecture Notes (TSRI Press, 1999).

Total Synthesis of streptonigrin (1983), juncusol (1984), rufescine and imelutine (1984), colchicine (1985), lavendamycin (1985), PDE-I and PDE-II (1987), prodigiosin and prodigiosene (1988), trikentrin A (1991), combretastatin (1991), (–)-pyrimidoblamic acid (1993), streptonigrone (1993), isochrysohermidin (1993), (+)-P-3A (1994), fredericamycin (1995), grandirubrine and imerubrine (1985), nothapodytine B and (–)-mappicine (1998), ningalin A, lamellarin O, lukianol A, and storniamide A (1999), phomazarin (1999), ningalin B (2000), distamycin (2000), hippadine (2000), rubrulone (2000), fostriecin (2001), (–)-roseophilin (2001), (+)-camptothecin (2002), anhydrolycorinone (2002), minovine (2005), piericidin A1 and B1 (2005), ningalin D (2005), (–)-vindorosine (2006), (–)-vindoline (2006), N-methylaspidospermidine (2006), cytostatin (2006), phostriecin (2010), (+)-fendleridine and (+)-acetylaspidoalbidine (2010), (–)-vindorosine (2010), lycogarubin C and lycogalic acid (2010), (–)-aspidospermine (2012), (+)-spegazzinine (2012), kopsinine (2013), asymmetric synthesis of (+)-P-3A and (–)-pyrimidoblamic acid (2014), (–)-kopsifoline D (2014), (–)-deoxoapodine (2014), (–)-kopsinine (2015), dihydrolysergol and dihydrolysergic acid (2015), meth-oxatin (2016), streptide (2019), meayamycin (2020), (–)-pseudocopsinine (2020), (–)-minovincinine (2020), (–)-strempeliopine (2021), and (+)-paucidactine D (2025).

== Biologically Active Cyclic Peptides: Glycopeptide Antibiotics ==
Total syntheses of DNA bis-intercalating cyclic peptide antitumor agents (sandramycin, luzopeptins A through C, thiocoraline, triostin A) and protein synthesis inhibitors (bouvardin, RA-VII), along with p53/MDM2 binding inhibitors like chlorofusin.

The most developed line here is the glycopeptide antibiotics: total syntheses of vancomycin (2014) and its aglycon (1999), teicoplanin aglycon (2000), ristocetin A aglycon (2005), ramoplanin aglycons (2003), and chloropeptins I/II (2009). The mechanistic centerpiece is the rational redesign of vancomycin's binding pocket: altering a single atom to enable dual binding to both D-Ala-D-Ala (the target in vancomycin sensitive bacteria) and D-Ala-D-Lac (the altered target in resistant strains like VRSA/VRE). The group quantified the energetic basis of resistance, roughly 100-fold destabilization from a repulsive lone pair/lone pair interaction and 10-fold from a lost hydrogen bond, which guided the design of [Ψ[CH2NH]Tpg4]vancomycin (2015) and [Ψ[C(=NH)NH]Tpg4]vancomycin (2014). Adding chlorobiphenyl peripheral modifications on top of the binding pocket redesign produced analogs with up to three independent, synergistic mechanisms of action (only one dependent on D-Ala-D-Ala binding), broad spectrum activity against MRSA, VanA, VanB, and VRE, and MICs as low as 0.005 to 0.01 μg/mL.

== DNA-Agent Interactions ==
Studies of DNA-alkylating and DNA-cleaving antitumor natural products, including CC-1065, duocarmycin A and SA, and yatakemycin. This work defined their DNA alkylation selectivity (including behavior of the unnatural enantiomers), reaction rates and reversibility, stereoelectronic control of regioselectivity, and isolation of their adenine N3 adducts. The group identified the catalytic mechanism as a DNA binding induced conformational change that disrupts a stabilizing vinylogous amide conjugation ("shape dependent catalysis"), obtained high resolution NMR structures of the agents bound to DNA, and established a predictive parabolic relationship between chemical reactivity and biological potency across more than 2,000 synthesized analogs (135+ publications).

Parallel work on bleomycin (30 publications, about 100 analogs) traced DNA cleavage selectivity to G-triplex-like hydrogen bonding in the minor groove and produced an NMR structure of DNA bound deglycobleomycin A2. The lab also built a library of more than 9,000 distamycin analogs, characterized the DNA cross-linking chemistry of isochrysohermidin, and solved the DNA binding behavior of naturally occurring bis-intercalators (sandramycin, luzopeptins, quinoxapeptins, thiocoraline). A methodological byproduct of this work is the fluorescent intercalator displacement (FID) assay, now a standard tool for measuring DNA binding affinity and selectivity.

== Oleamide, FAAH, and Endocannabinoid Signaling ==
Originating from the 1995 discovery of oleamide as an endogenous sleep inducing signaling lipid, the first identified member of a class of fatty acid primary amide signaling molecules (46+ publications since). This led to characterizing the enzymes controlling its release (PAM) and degradation, notably fatty acid amide hydrolase (FAAH), identified in 1996. The group developed orally active, long acting alpha-ketoheterocycle inhibitors of FAAH and related serine hydrolases, introduced a proteome wide activity based protein profiling (ABPP) selectivity screen for these inhibitors (2003), solved X-ray structures of inhibitor bound FAAH, and validated FAAH as a therapeutic target in vivo. The pharmacological logic: inhibiting FAAH extends the action of the endogenous cannabinoid anandamide at its own receptors (CB1/CB2), giving temporally and spatially controlled pain and inflammation relief without the blunt agonism of directly dosing a cannabinoid receptor agonist.

== Signal Transduction ==
Investigations into receptor activation via homo- and heterodimerization/oligomerization, focused on the erythropoietin receptor (EPOr) and toll-like receptors (TLRs).

== Solution-Phase Combinatorial Chemistry ==
The lab pioneered solution-phase library synthesis techniques, including being first to use liquid-liquid and liquid-solid (ion exchange) extraction for compound purification, across both divergent and convergent library strategies. Libraries built include an 8,000-member alpha-helix/beta-turn mimetic set (targeting protein-protein interactions), a 9,000-member DNA binding library, and a comprehensive serine hydrolase inhibitor library. Discoveries from this work include the first small molecule to inhibit an enzyme by blocking its localization (MMP2, blocking angiogenesis and tumor growth in vivo, 2001), the first small molecule inhibitor of a transcription factor dimerization (Myc/Max, blocking Myc driven transformation, 2002), small molecule EPO mimetics acting as receptor dimerization agonists (2002), an ATIC enzyme inhibitor acting via blocked dimerization (2005), inhibitors of LEF-1/β-catenin protein-DNA interaction blocking aberrant transcription (2009), and small molecule TLR agonists, neoseptin (TLR4, 2016) and diprovocim (TLR1/TLR2, 2017), that promote receptor dimerization and activation, relevant to vaccine adjuvant design.

== GAR and AICAR Transformylase Inhibitors ==
Using X-ray crystal structures of the apo enzymes and their complexes with substrates and folate cofactors, the group is pursuing de novo design of inhibitors of these enzymes as antineoplastic agents.

== Awards ==
Dale Boger has received numerous awards and honors including:

- NSF Predoctoral Fellowship, 1975–78
- Searle Scholar Award, 1981–84
- NIH Research Career Development Award, 1983–88
- Alfred P. Sloan Fellow, 1985–89
- ACS Arthur C. Cope Scholar Award, 1988
- American Cyanamid Academic Award, 1988
- Japan Promotion of Science Fellow, 1993
- ISHC Katritzky Award in Heterocyclic Chemistry, 1997
- Honorary Member, The Lund Chemical Society (Sweden), 1998
- ACS Aldrich Award for Creativity in Organic Synthesis, 1999
- A. R. Day Award, POCC 1999
- Honorary Ph.D. Degree: Laurea Honors Causa, Univ. of Ferrara, 2000
- Smissman Lecturer, Univ. of Kansas, 2000
- Yamanouchi USA Faculty Award, 2000
- Myron L. Bender & Muriel S. Bender Distinguished Summer Lectureship, Northwestern University, 2001
- Paul Janssen Prize for Creativity in Organic Synthesis, 2002
- Ross Lecturer, Dartmouth College, 2002
- Fellow, American Association for the Advancement of Science, 2003
- Adrien Albert Medal, Royal Society of Chemistry, 2003
- ISI Highly Cited (top 100 chemists)
- Alder Lecturer, University of Köln, 2005
- Member, American Academy of Arts and Sciences, 2006
- ACS Guenther Award in Natural Products, 2007
- Editor-in-Chief, Bioorganic & Medicinal Chemistry Letters, 1990–present
- Executive Editorial Board Member, Tetrahedron Publications, 1990–present
- ACS Medicinal Chemistry Division
- Long Range Planning Committee, 1981–1983
- Awards Committee, 1984–1986
- Councilor, 1996–1999
- Tetrahedron Prize for Creativity in Organic Chemistry, 2020
- ISHC E.C. Taylor Award in Heterocyclic Chemistry, 2019
- AIC Chemical Pioneer Award, 2025

== Sources ==
- https://web.archive.org/web/20070926225751/http://www.scripps.edu/chem/boger/db.html
- https://web.archive.org/web/20060911020926/https://www.chemistry.msu.edu/Lectureships/lectures.asp?series=DK&Year=1997
- Boger, Dale L. (1999). Modern Organic Synthesis. TSRI Press.
