= Stryker's reagent =

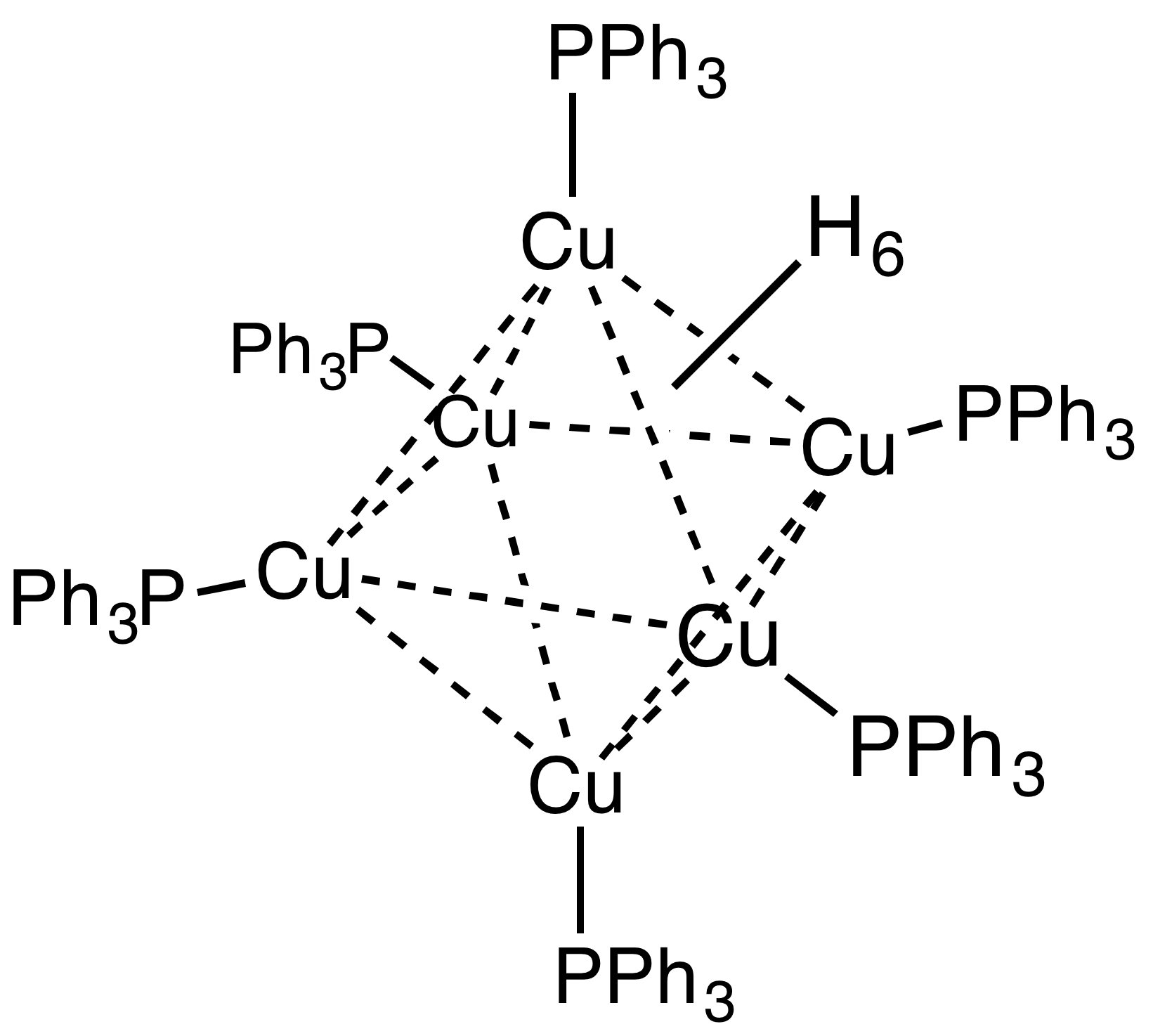

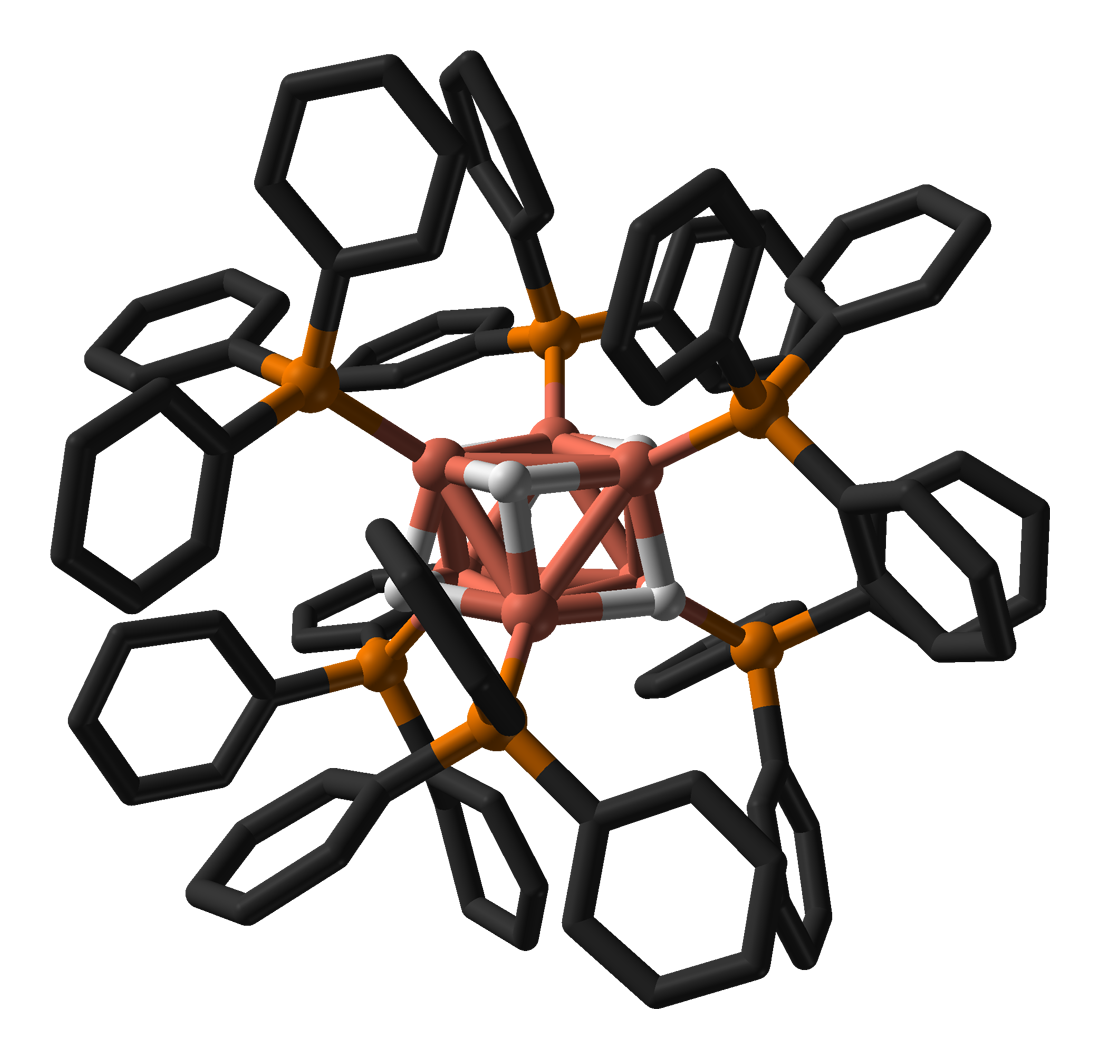

Identifiers
CAS Number	33636-93-0
ChemSpider	21169449
ECHA InfoCard	100.156.010
EC Number	627-669-7
PubChem CID	12181933
UNII	8X3R32M7XU
CompTox Dashboard (EPA)	DTXSID40475132
- InChI: InChI=1S/6C18H15P.6Cu.6H/c6*1-4-10-16(11-5-1)19(17-12-6-2-7-13-17)18-14-8-3-9-15-18;;;;;;;;;;;;/h6*1-15H;;;;;;;;;;;; Key: PYHLOCIDGQNZFY-UHFFFAOYSA-N SMILES=C1=CC=C(C=C1)P(C2=CC=CC=C2)C3=CC=CC=C3.C1=CC=C(C=C1)P(C2=CC=CC=C2)C3=CC=CC=C3.C1=CC=C(C=C1)P(C2=CC=CC=C2)C3=CC=CC=C3.C1=CC=C(C=C1)P(C2=CC=CC=C2)C3=CC=CC=C3.C1=CC=C(C=C1)P(C2=CC=CC=C2)C3=CC=CC=C3.C1=CC=C(C=C1)P(C2=CC=CC=C2)C3=CC=CC=C3.[CuH].[CuH].[CuH].[CuH].[CuH].[CuH]

Properties
Chemical formula	C_{108}H_{96}Cu_{6}P_{6}
Molar mass	1961.04
- Except where otherwise noted, data are given for materials in their standard state (at 25 °C [77 °F], 100 kPa). verify (what is ?) Infobox references

Stryker's reagent ([(PPh_{3})CuH]_{6}), also known as the Osborn complex, is a hexameric copper hydride ligated with triphenylphosphine. It is a brick red, air-sensitive solid. Stryker's reagent is a mildly hydridic reagent, used in homogeneous catalysis of conjugate reduction reactions of enones, enoates, and related substrates.

== Preparation and structure ==
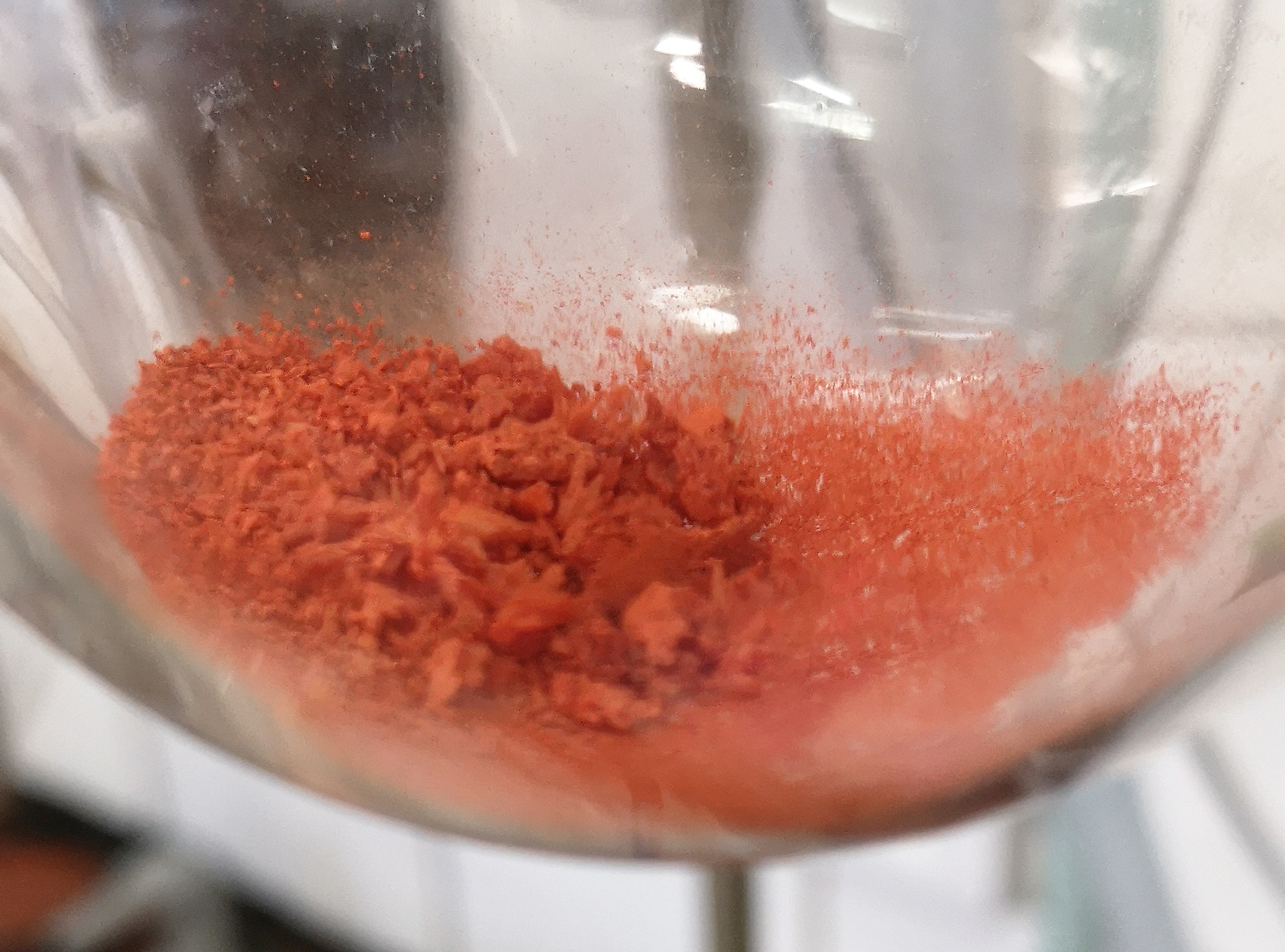
Stryker's Reagent [PPh_{3}-CuH]_{6} under nitrogen atmosphere

The compound is prepared by adding sodium trimethoxyborohydride to a solution of [PPh_{3}CuCl]_{4} in DMF, after which it precipitates out as a DMF complex ([HCu(PPh_{3})]_{6}•DMF). Other more convenient methods have been developed since its discovery.

In terms of its structure, the compound is an octahedral cluster of Cu(PPh_{3}) centres that are bonded by Cu---Cu and Cu---H interactions. Originally six of the eight faces were thought to be capped by hydride ligands. This structural assignment was revised in 2014; the hydrides are now best described as edge bridging rather than face bridging.

== Applications in organic synthesis ==
The compound can effect regioselective conjugate reductions of various carbonyl derivatives including unsaturated aldehydes, ketones, and esters. This reagent was assigned as the "Reagent of the year" in 1991 for its functional group tolerance, high overall efficiency, and mild reaction conditions in the reduction reactions. Stryker's reagent is used in a catalytic amount where it is regenerated in the reaction in situ using a stoichiometric hydride source, often being molecular hydrogen or silanes. If stored under an inert atmosphere (e.g., argon, nitrogen) it has indefinite shelf life. Brief exposure to oxygen does not destroy its activity significantly, although solvents used with Stryker's reagent should be rigorously degassed.

== Modifications to Stryker's reagent ==
Ligand-modified versions of Stryker's reagent have been reported. By changing the ligand to, e.g., P(O-iPr)_{3} the selectivity can be improved significantly. In addition, Lipshutz et al., have shown that the addition of a bidentate, achiral bis-phosphine ligand on the Cu center can lead to substrate-to-ligand ratios typically on the order of 1000−10000:1 can be used to afford products in high yields.
