= Hydroamination =

Addition of an N–H group across a C=C or C≡C bond

In organic chemistry, hydroamination is the formal addition of an N−H bond of an amine across a carbon-carbon multiple bond of an alkene, alkyne, diene, or allene. In the ideal case, hydroamination is atom economical and green; and the products could see extensive use in fine-chemical, pharmaceutical, and agricultural industries. Hydroamination reactions occur spontaneously only for electrophilic alkenes and some dienes, but these are known by other names (e.g. Michael addition reaction); "hydroamination" is generally reserved for situations where the reaction requires a catalyst. Hydroamination is however of little value industrially.

Hydroamination can be used intramolecularly to create heterocycles or intermolecularly with a separate amine and unsaturated compound.

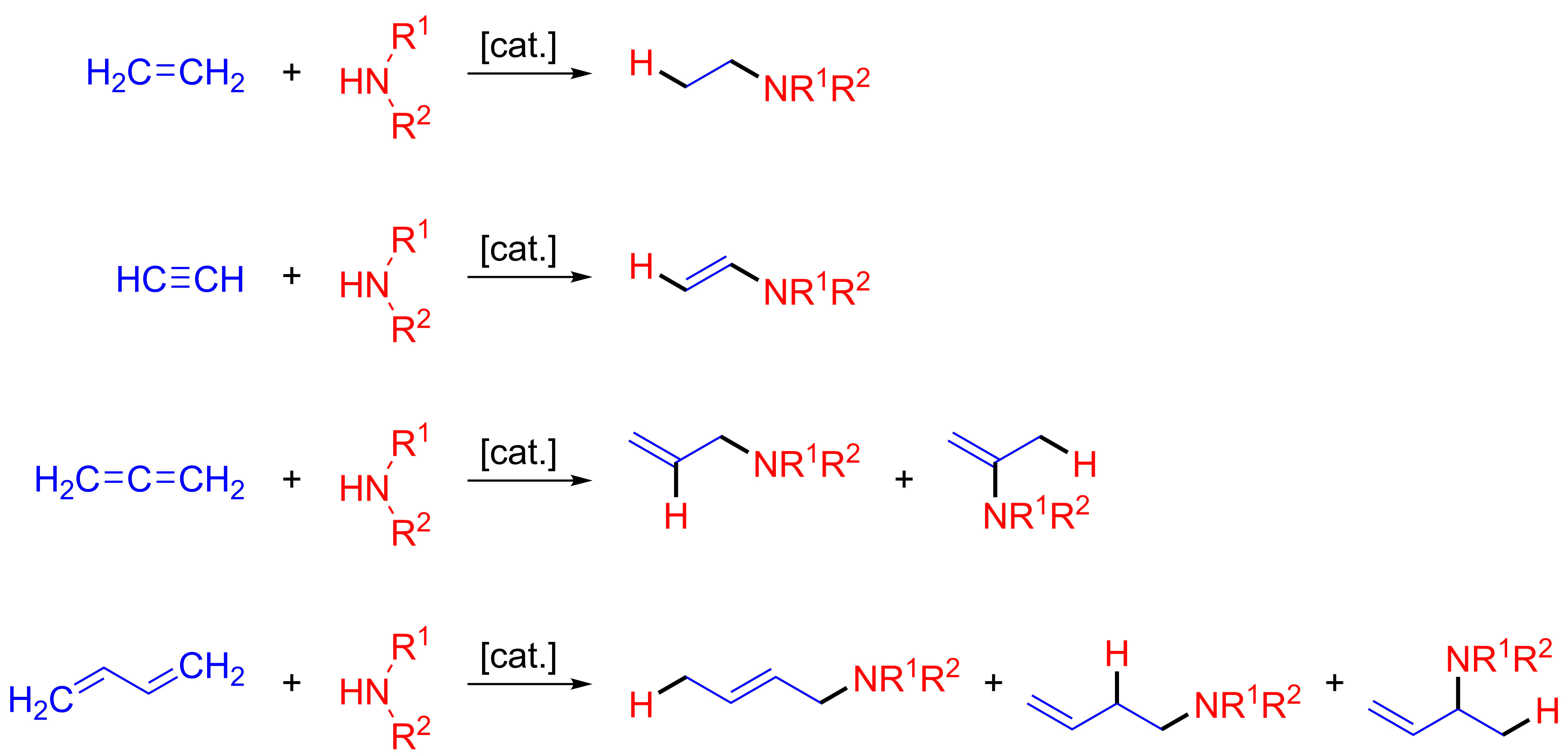
Prototypical intermolecular hydroamination reactions.

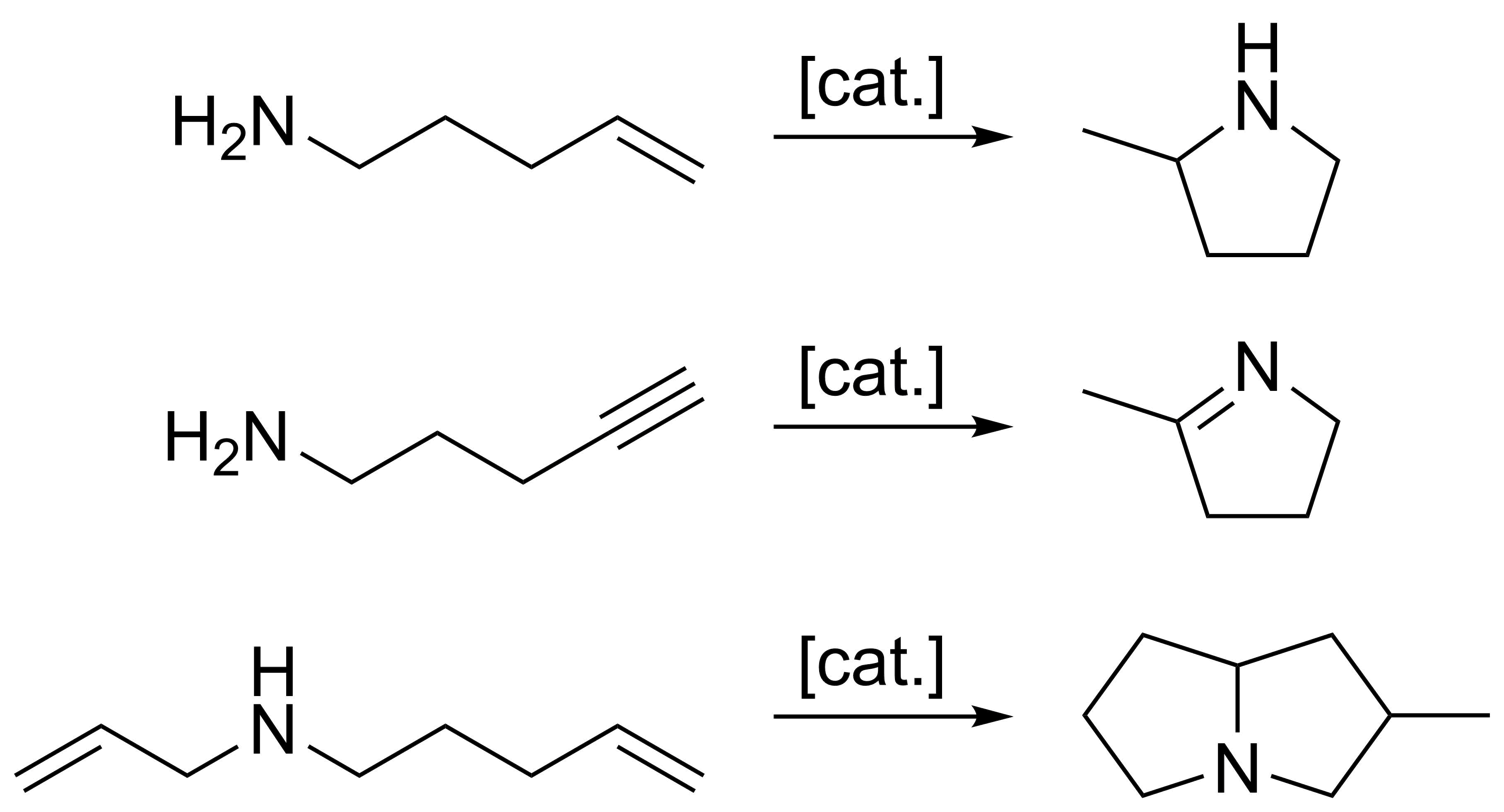
Examples of intramolecular hydroamination.

== Formal hydroamination ==
The addition of hydrogen and an amino group (NR_{2}) using reagents other than the amine HNR_{2} is known as a "formal hydroamination" reaction. Although the advantages of atom economy and/or ready available of the nitrogen source are diminished as a result, the greater thermodynamic driving force, as well as ability to tune the aminating reagent are potentially useful. In place of the amine, hydroxylamine esters and nitroarenes have been reported as nitrogen sources.

== History ==
Hydroamination was first developed for generating fragrances from myrcene. In this conversion, diethylamine adds across the diene substituent, the reaction being catalyzed by lithium diethylamide. Intramolecular hydroaminations were reported by Tobin J. Marks in 1989 using metallocene derived from rare-earth metals such as lanthanum, lutetium, and samarium. Catalytic rates correlated inversely with the ionic radius of the metal, perhaps as a consequence of steric interference from the ligands. In 1992, Marks developed the first chiral hydroamination catalysts by using a chiral auxiliary, which were the first hydroamination catalysts to favor only one specific stereoisomer. Chiral auxiliaries on the metallocene ligands were used to dictate the stereochemistry of the product. The first non-metallocene chiral catalysts were reported in 2003, and used bisarylamido and aminophenolate ligands to give higher enantioselectivity.

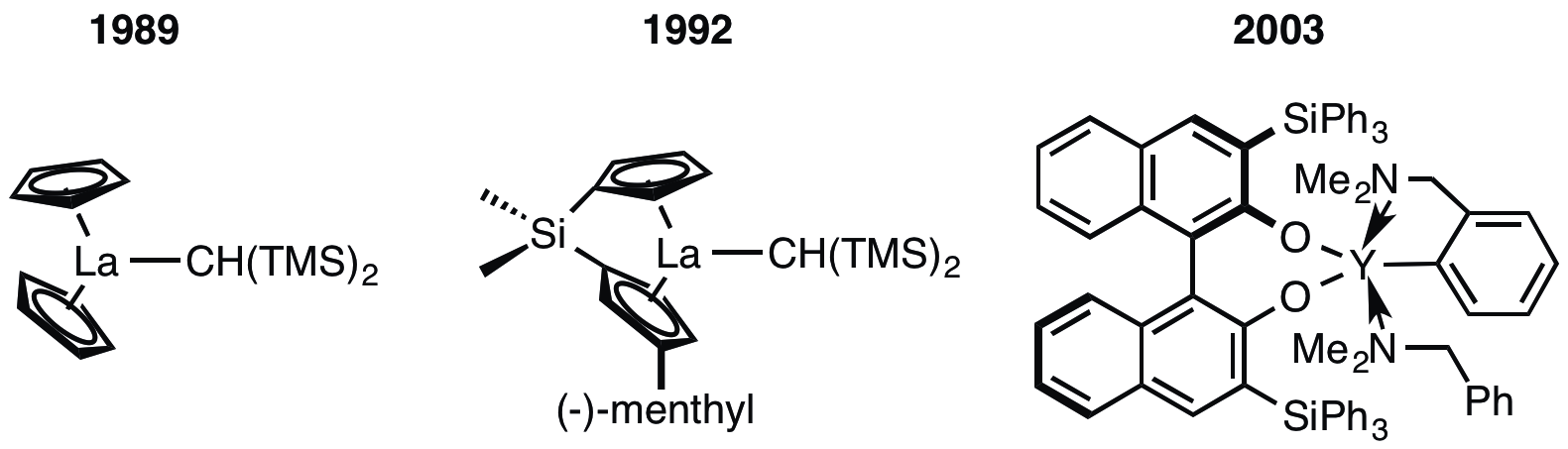
Notable hydroamination catalysts by year of publication

== Reaction scope ==
Hydroamination does not occur spontaneously, but requires catalysis. It is, however, approximately thermochemically neutral. The reaction has a large barrier: the nitrogen atom lone pair and the electron-rich carbon-carbon multiple bond repel each other, and (except in the intramolecular case) addition reactions are inherently entropically disfavoured. Radical amination is not a chain reaction, because hydrogen abstraction from the amine to a carbon atom is thermodynamically disfavored.

Hydroamination reactions have seen extensive academic research, because they are atom-efficient and use common, cheap starting materials. Also, direct hydroamination strategies can in principle substantially shorten many synthesis protocols. As a result, many different situations now admit hydroamination with the appropriate catalyst. Amines that have been investigated include primary, secondary, cyclic, acyclic, and anilinic amines with diverse steric and electronic substituents. Unsaturated substrates include alkenes, dienes, alkynes, and allenes. Reactions occur both intra- and intermolecularly. Markovnikov addition is generally favored, but some tools exist to control the regioselectivity of the addition.

== Catalysts ==
Many metal-ligand combinations have been reported to catalyze hydroamination, and can be roughly divided into three categories.

=== pH extremes ===
In the simplest case, strong Brønsted acids and bases catalyze hydroamination. One example is the ethylation of piperidine using ethene:

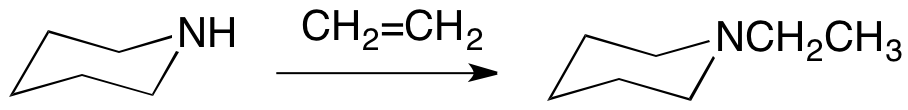
Hydroamination of ethene with piperidine proceeds with no transition metal catalyst, but requires a strong base (sodium piperidinide), high temperature, and high ethylene partial pressure

Such pH-extremal reactions proceed well with ethene but higher alkenes are less reactive.

=== Weakly-coordinating metals ===
Alternatively, weakly-coordinating Lewis acids also catalyze the reaction. These include salts of the alkali, alkaline-earth, rare-earth, and low-valent early transition metals (e.g. titanium and zirconium), as well as bismuth and probably certain actinide complexes. Zeolites have also shown utility in hydroamination.

The mechanism of these hydroaminations has been well studied. First, the catalyst is activated by amide exchange, generating the active catalyst (i). Next, the alkene inserts into the Ln-N bond (ii). Finally, protonolysis occurs generating the cyclized product while also regenerating the active catalyst (iii).

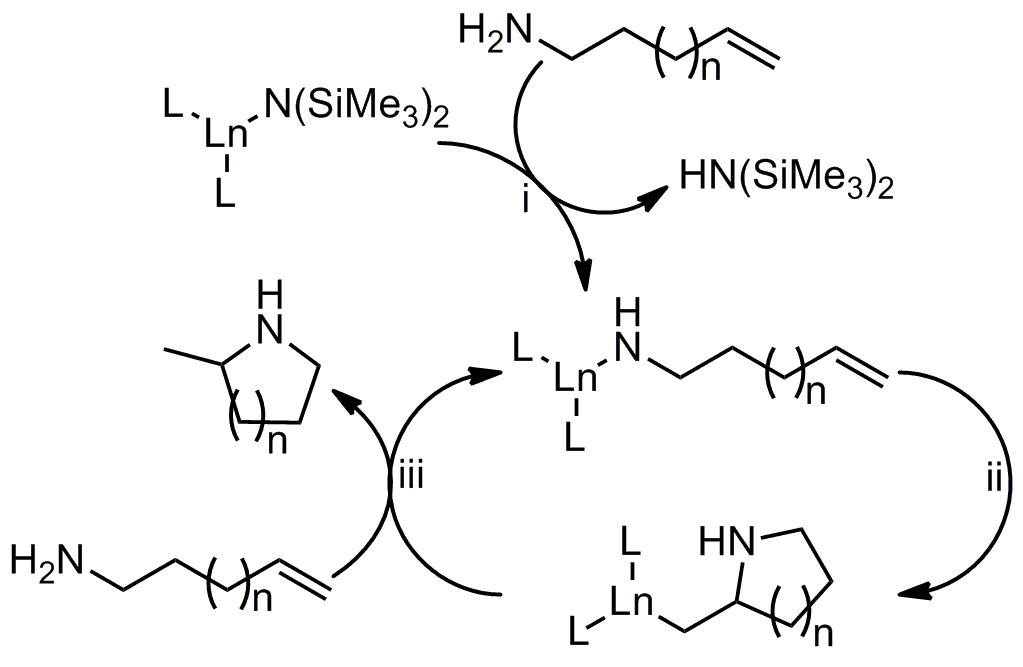

=== Late transition-metal complexes ===
The complexes of late transition metals (e.g. ruthenium and palladium) and group 13 metals such as aluminum and indium offer a great deal of control over the regio- and stereoselectivity of the reaction. For example, a rare and more synthetically valuable kinetic allylamine product was reported when hydroaminating an allene. One system utilized temperatures of 80 °C with a rhodium catalyst and aniline derivatives as the amine. The other reported system utilized a palladium catalyst at room temperature with a wide range of primary and secondary cyclic and acyclic amines. Both systems produced the desired allyl amines in high yield:

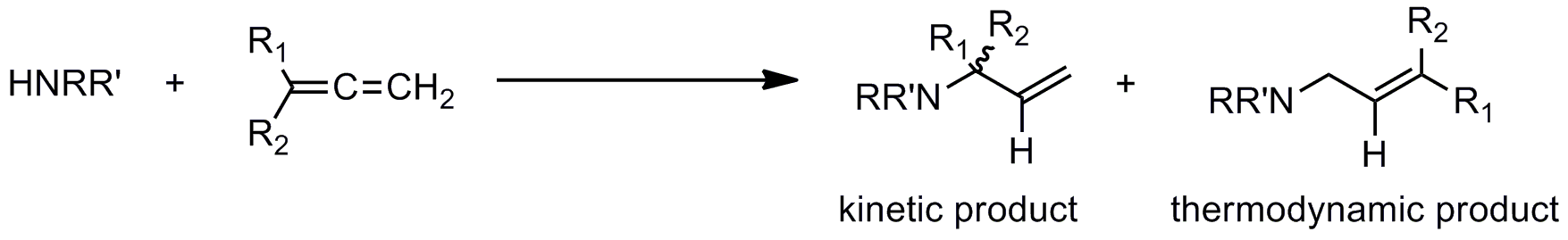

In general, hydroamination with late transition-metal complexes has multiple pathways depending on the regioselective determining step. The four main categories are (1) nucleophilic attack on an alkene alkyne, or allyl ligand and (2) insertion of the alkene into the metal-amide bond. Generic catalytic cycles appear below.

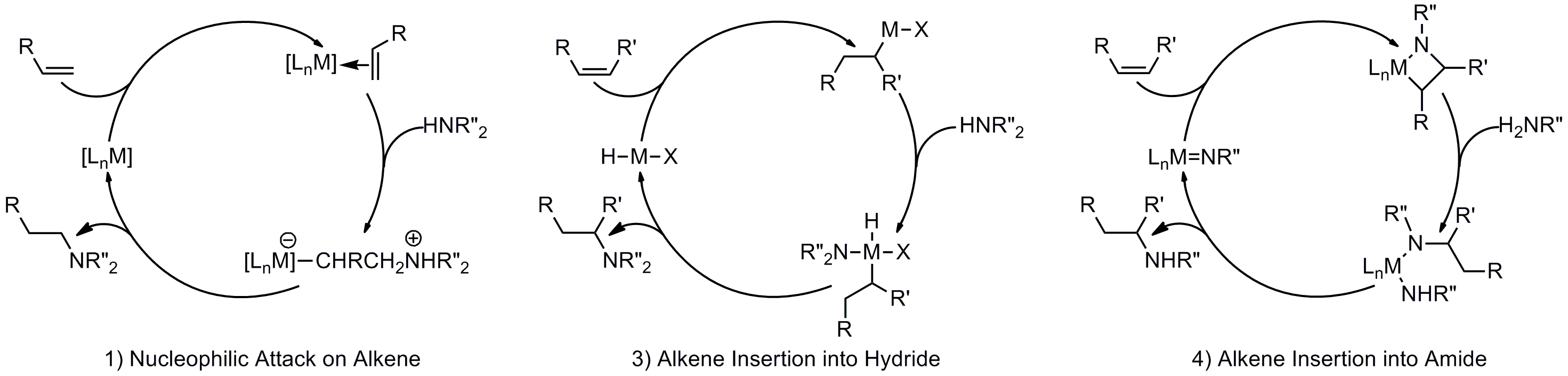

== Applications ==
No industrial applications of hydroamination are known, but hydroamination syntheses of industrial products have been performed in academia.

Hydroamination has been utilized to synthesize the anti-nausea medication cinnarizine in quantitative yield.

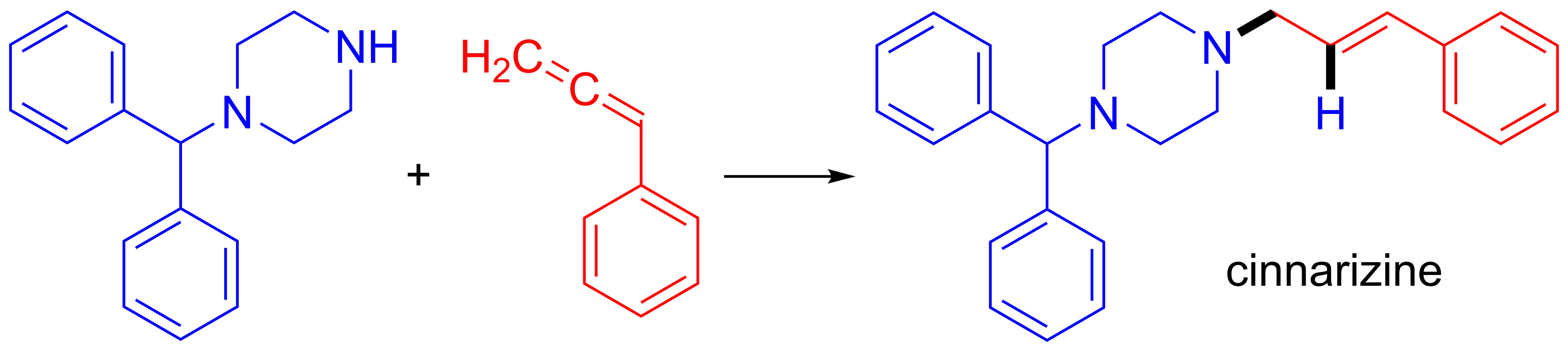
Synthesis of cinnarizine via hydroamination.

Hydroamination is also promising for the synthesis of alkaloids as, in the total synthesis of (-)-epimyrtine.

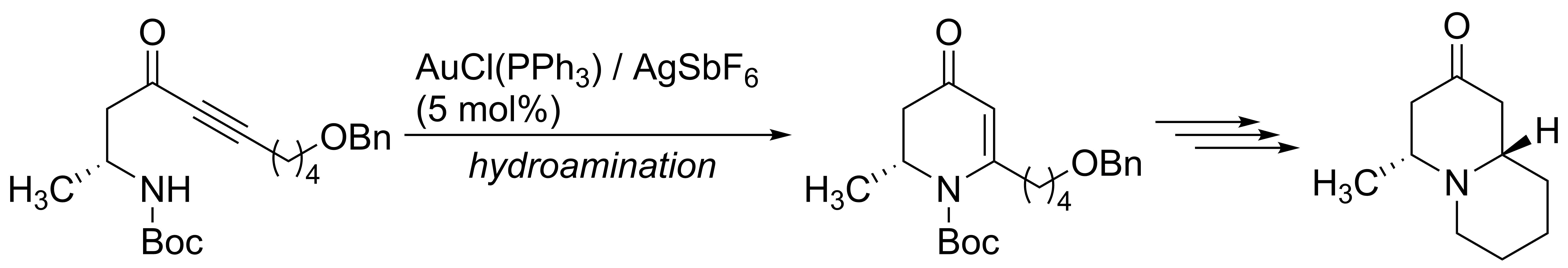
Gold-catalyzed hydroamination used for the total synthesis of (-)-epimyrtine.

== See also ==
- Ammoxidation - reaction of ammonia with alkenes to give nitriles
- Electrophilic amination — polarity-reversed reaction
- Hydroboration
- Hydrosilylation
- (Olefin) Hydration
- Hydrofunctionalization
