= Transition metal silyl complexes =

In chemistry, transition metal silyl complexes describe coordination complexes in which a transition metal is bonded to an anionic silyl ligand, forming a metal-silicon sigma bond. This class of complexes are numerous and some are technologically significant as intermediates in hydrosilylation. These complexes are a subset of organosilicon compounds.

== Synthesis ==
Silyl halides and hydrides easily add oxidatively to "low-valent, electron-rich complexes". Other reagents for oxidative additions are rare, and typically require a strained bond for the metal to insert into.

Electron-poor complexes form when a silanide displaces an X-type ligand, and often form oligomeric ring clusters. The complexes are extremely reactive with oxygen, and must be investigated air-free. If they also bear organyl ligands, the complex may rearrange to an organosilane and a hydride ligand.

=== From silyl halides ===
The first silyl complexes were prepared by treatment of sodium cyclopentadienyliron dicarbonyl with trimethylsilyl chloride:

(C_{5}H_{5})Fe(CO)_{2}Na + Me_{3}SiCl → (C_{5}H_{5})Fe(CO)_{2}SiMe_{3} + NaCl

Although metal carbonyl anions are convenient reaction substrates, polar solvents promote nucleophilic attack on the carbonyl oxygen instead. In such cases, the result is instead a Fischer carbene that usually decomposes to a siloxane.

=== From hydrosilanes ===
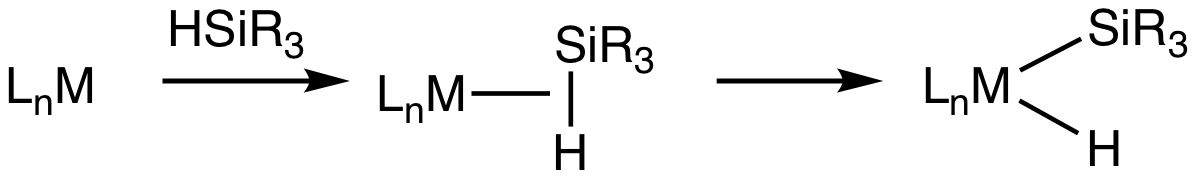
Hydrosilane oxidative addition

Hydrosilanes oxidatively add to low-valent metal complexes to give silyl metal hydrides. Such species are assumed intermediates in hydrosilylation catalysis.

Compact, electronegative substituents on the silicon favor the addition; hence a H–Si–I moiety will add across H–Si before Si–I. The process begins when the intact hydrosilane associates to the unsaturated metal center, affording an agostic σ-silane complex (see § Silane complexes).

Alternatively, the hydrosilane may reduce another ligand. Diphenylsilylating the Petasis reagent eliminates methane (Me = CH_{3}, Ph = C_{6}H_{5}):

2 (C_{5}H_{5})_{2}TiMe_{2} + 2 Ph_{2}SiH_{2} → [(C_{5}H_{5})_{2}TiSiPh_{2}]_{2} + 4 MeH

Likewise, certain early transition metal hydrides react with hydrosilanes at high temperature, eliminating H_{2}.

=== From disilanes ===
Low valent metals insert into the Si-Si bond of disilanes. The main limitation of this reaction is the paucity of disilanes as reagents. Bis(silyl)mercury reagents behave similarly.

=== Acid-base metathesis ===
Acidic metal hydrides can condense with silazanes, but the reverse-polarity reaction between a silane and an amino complex is not possible.

== Silyl complexes with Si–Si bonds ==
Beyond simple ligands like SiR_{3}–, silyl ligands with Si-Si bonds are known. (C_{5}H_{5})Fe(CO)_{2}-SiMe_{2}SiPh_{3} is one example (Me = CH_{3}, Ph = C_{6}H_{5}). Another example is the metalacycle derived from titanocene dichloride, (C_{5}H_{5})_{2}Ti(SiPh_{2})_{5}.

== Silene and disilene complexes ==
Compounds containing a 3-membered metal-silicon-carbon ring are formally η^{2} complexes of silenes, although they are not prepared from such unstable precursors. Instead, silenes are produced from Grignard or Barbier reagents, e.g.:

Cp*(PMe_{3})IrClMe + ClMgCH_{2}SiPh_{2}H → Cp*(PMe_{3})Ir(η^{2}-SiR′_{2}CH_{2}) + MgCl_{2} + CH_{4}
Cp_{2}W(Cl)(CH_{2}SiMe_{2}Cl) + Mg → Cp_{2}W(η^{2}-SiR′_{2}CH_{2}) + MgCl_{2}

Disilene complexes are typically produced by dehydrogenation of the corresponding hydrodisilanes.

== Reactions ==
Electron-rich metal complexes undergo nucleophilic attack at silicon, and Brønsted acids usually convert silyl complexes to hydride complexes. The product may eliminate with retention or inversion of stereochemistry at silicon, or may form a 3-membered ring in which silicon is hypercoordinate.

Geminal dihalides react with silylmetal anions to give a halide anion, a silyl halide, and a metal carbene complex.

Insertions between the metal and silicon are hindered by the partial π bond formed through negative hyperconjugation. The process proceeds with alkenes and alkynes, possibly through [2+2] addition to form a metallasilacyclobutane intermediate.

Ketones and aldehydes react extensively with metal silanes, producing either M–C–O–Si or Si–C–O–M, depending on the reagents.

== Silane complexes ==
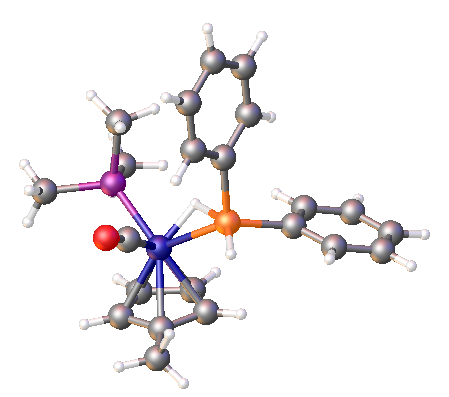
Structure of (MeC_{5}H_{4})Mn(CO)(PMe_{3})(η^{2}-H_{2}SiPh_{2}), a diphenylsilane σ complex. Selected distances: Si-Mn = 325, H-Fe = 149, Si-H(Mn) = 177, Si-H_{terminal} = 135 picometer.

Transition metal silane complexes are coordination compounds containing hydrosilane ligands. An early example is (MeC_{5}H_{4})Mn(CO)_{2}(η^{2}-HSiPh_{3}) (Ph = C_{6}H_{5}).

The bonding in silane sigma complexes is similar to that invoked in agostic interactions. The metal center engages the Si-H entity via a 3-center, 2-electron bond. It is widely assumed that these sigma complexes are intermediates in the oxidative addition of hydrosilanes to give metal silyl hydrides. This transformation is invoked in hydrosilylation catalysis.

Evidence for sigma-silane complexes is provided by proton NMR spectroscopy. For (MeC_{5}H_{4})Mn(CO)_{2}(η^{2}-HSiPh_{3}), J(^{29}Si,^{1}H) = 65 Hz compared to 180 Hz in free diphenylsilane. In silyl hydride complexes, the coupling in about 6 Hz. Neutron diffraction studies reveal a Si-H distance of 1.802(5) Å in the corresponding η^{2}-HSiFPh_{2} complex vs 1.48 Å in free HSiFPh_{2}. Elongated Si-H bonds are characteristic of these sigma complexes.
