= Silanes =

Class of organosilicon compounds with the formula SiR4

In organosilicon chemistry, silanes are a diverse class of charge-neutral organic compounds with the general formula SiR_{4}. The R substituents can be any combination of organic or inorganic groups. Most silanes contain Si-C bonds, and are discussed under organosilicon compounds. Some contain Si-H bonds and are discussed under hydrosilanes.

== Examples ==
- Silane SiH_{4}, the parent.
- Binary silicon-hydrogen compounds (which are sometimes called silanes also) includes silane itself but also compounds with Si-Si bonds including disilane and longer chains.
- Silanes with one, two, three, or four Si-H bonds are called hydrosilanes. Silane is again the parent member. Examples: triethylsilane (HSi(C_{2}H_{5})_{3}) and triethoxysilane (HSi(OC_{2}H_{5})_{3}).
- Polysilanes are organosilicon compounds with the formula (R_{2}Si)_{n}. They feature Si-Si bonds. Attracting more interest are the organic derivatives such as polydimethylsilane ((CH_{3})_{2}Si)_{n}. Dodecamethylcyclohexasilane ((CH_{3})_{2}Si)_{6} is an oligomer of such materials. Formally speaking, polysilanes also include compounds of the type (SiH_{2})n, but these less studied.
- Carbosilanes are polymeric silanes with alternating Si-C bonds.
- Chlorosilanes have Si-Cl bonds. The dominant examples come from the Direct process, i.e., (CH_{3})_{4-x}SiCl_{x}. Another important member is trichlorosilane (SiHCl_{3}).
- Organosilanes are a class of charge-neutral organosilicon compounds. Example: tetramethylsilane (Si(CH_{3})_{4})

By tradition, compounds with Si-O-Si bonds are usually not referred to as silanes. Instead, they are called siloxanes. One example is hexamethyldisiloxane, ((CH_{3})_{3}Si)_{2}O.

== Applications ==
Compound-specific applications are:

- Polysilicone production
- PEX crosslinking agent
- Textile finishing industry
- Dentistry
- Integrated in battery materials to longevity
- Construction materials (Acryloxy Silane)

== See also ==
- Silane quats
- Silanide – Anionic molecule derived from silane
- Silenes – Silicon compounds with an Si=Si bond
