= Nucleophilic abstraction =

Type of organometallic reaction

Nucleophilic abstraction is a type of an organometallic reaction which can be defined as a nucleophilic attack on a ligand which causes part or all of the original ligand to be removed from the metal along with the nucleophile.

== Alkyl abstraction ==
While nucleophilic abstraction of an alkyl group is relatively uncommon, there are examples of this type of reaction. In order for this reaction to be favorable, the metal must first be oxidized because reduced metals are often poor leaving groups. The oxidation of the metal causes the M-C bond to weaken, which allows for the nucleophilic abstraction to occur. G.M. Whitesides and D.J. Boschetto use the halogens Br_{2} and I_{2} as M-C cleaving agents in the following example of nucleophilic abstraction.

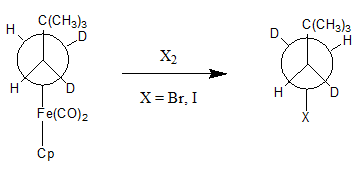

The product of this reaction is inverted with respect to the stereochemical center attached to the metal. There are several possibilities for the mechanism of this reaction which are shown in the following schematic.

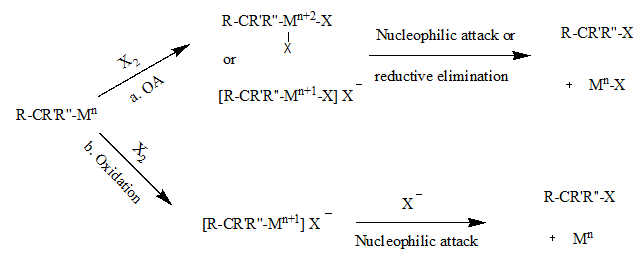

In path a, the first step proceeds with the oxidative addition of the halogen to the metal complex. This step results in the oxidized metal center that is needed to weaken the M-C bond. The second step can proceed with either the nucleophilic attack of the halide ion on the α-carbon of the alkyl group or reductive elimination, both of which result in the inversion of stereochemistry. In path b, the metal is first oxidized without the addition of the halide. The second step occurs with a nucleophilic attack of the α-carbon which again results in the inversion of stereochemistry.

== Carbonyl abstraction ==
Trimethylamine N-oxide (Me_{3}NO) can be used in the nucleophilic abstraction of carbonyl. There is an nucleophilic attack of Me_{3}NO on the carbon of the carbonyl group which pushes electrons on the metal. The reaction then proceeds to kick out CO_{2} and NMe_{3}.

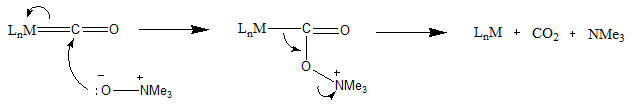

An article from the Bulletin of Korean Chemical Society journal showed interesting results where one iridium complex undergoes carbonyl abstraction while a very similar iridium complex undergoes hydride extraction.

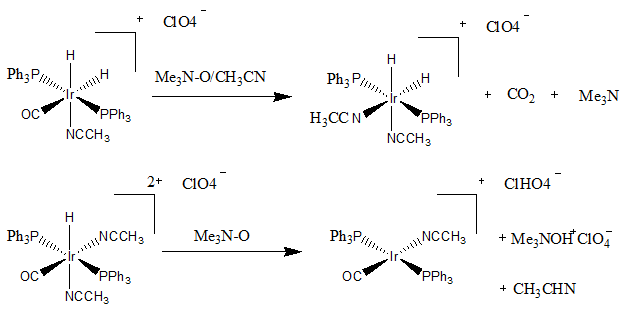

== Hydrogen abstraction ==
Nucleophilic abstraction can occur on a ligand of a metal if the conditions are right. For instance the following example shows the nucleophilic abstraction of H^{+} from an arene ligand attached to chromium. The electron withdrawing nature of the chromium allows for the reaction to occur as a facile reaction.

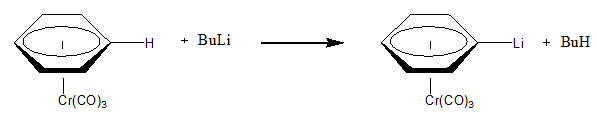

== Methyl abstraction ==
A Fischer carbene can undergo nucleophilic abstraction where a methyl group is removed. With the addition of a small abstracting agent, the abstracting agent would normally add to the carbene carbon. In this case however, the steric bulk of the abstracting agent that is added causes the abstraction of the methyl group. If the methyl group is replaced with ethyl, the reaction proceeds 70 times slower which is to be expected with a S_{N}2 displacement mechanism.

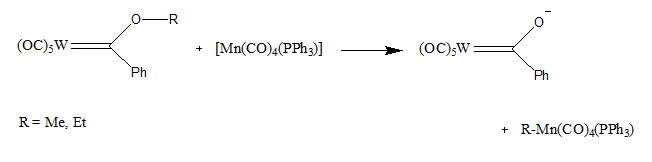

== Silylium abstraction ==
A silylium ion is a silicon cation with only three bonds and a positive charge. The abstraction of the silylium ion is seen from the ruthenium complex shown below.

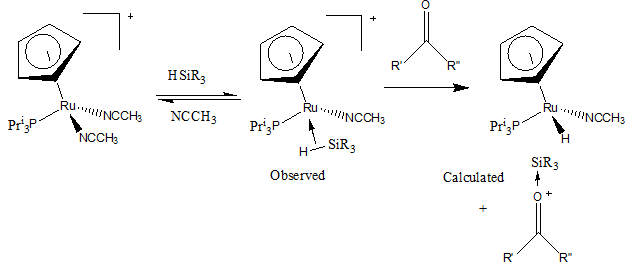

In the first step of this mechanism one of the acetonitrile groups is replaced by a silicon molecule where the bond between the silicon and the hydrogen is coordinating to the ruthenium. In the second step a ketone is added for the nucleophilic abstraction of the silylium ion and the hydrogen is left on the metal.

== α-Acyl abstraction ==
One example of nucleophilic abstraction of an α-acyl group is seen when MeOH is added to the following palladium complex. The mechanism follows a tetrahedral intermediate which results in the methyl ester and the reduced palladium complex shown.

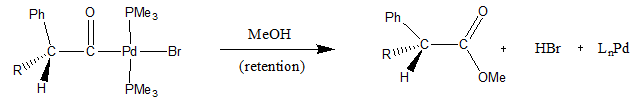

The following year a similar mechanism was proposed where oxidative addition of an aryl halide followed by migratory CO insertion and is followed by nucleophilic abstraction of the α-acyl by MeOH. One of the advantages of this intermolecular nucleophilic abstraction is the production of linear acyl derivatives. The intramolecular attack of these linear acyl derivatives gives rise to cyclic compounds such as lactones or lactams.

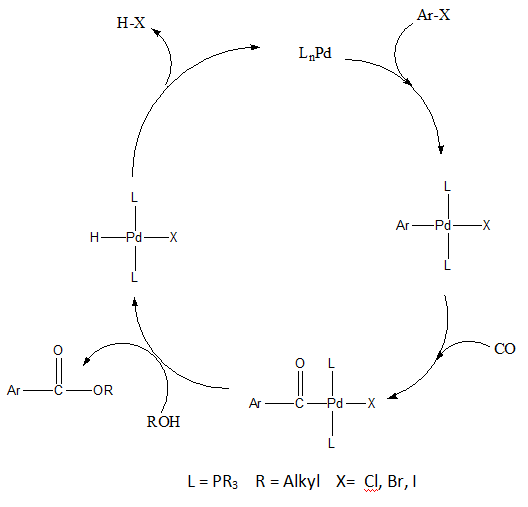

== See also ==
- Addition to pi ligands
