= Reductions with hydrosilanes =

Methods of hydrogenation and hydrogenolysis of organic compounds

Reductions with hydrosilanes are methods used for hydrogenation and hydrogenolysis of organic compounds. The approach is a subset of ionic hydrogenation. In this particular method, the substrate is treated with a hydrosilane and auxiliary reagent, often a strong acid, resulting in formal transfer of hydride from silicon to carbon. This style of reduction with hydrosilanes enjoys diverse if specialized applications.

== Scope ==
=== Deoxygenation of alcohols and halides ===
Some alcohols are reduced to alkanes when treated with hydrosilanes in the presence of a strong Lewis acid. Brønsted acids may also be used. Tertiary alcohols undergo facile reduction using boron trifluoride etherate as the Lewis acid. Primary alcohols require an excess of the silane, a stronger Lewis acid, and long reaction times.

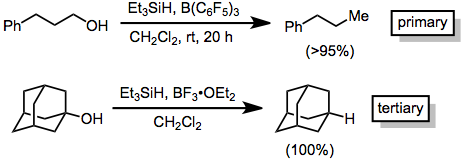

Skeletal rearrangements are sometimes induced. Another side reaction is nucleophilic attack of the conjugate base on the intermediate carbocation. In organosilane reductions of substrates bearing prostereogenic groups, diastereoselectivity is often high. Reduction of either diastereomer of 2-phenyl-2-norbornanol leads exclusively to the endo diastereomer of 2-phenylnorbornane. None of the exo diastereomer was observed.

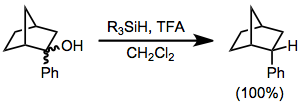

Allylic alcohols may be deoxygenated in the presence of tertiary alcohols when ethereal lithium perchlorate is employed as a source of Li^{+}.

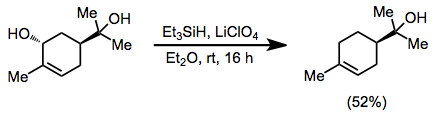

Reductions of alkyl halides and triflates gives poorer yields in general than reductions of alcohols. A Lewis or Bronsted acid is required.

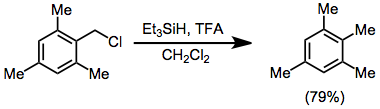

=== Reduction of carbonyls ===
Aldehydes and ketones

Polymeric hydrosilanes, such as polymethylhydrosiloxane (PHMS), may be employed to facilitate separation of the reduced products from silicon-containing byproducts.

Enantioselective reductions of ketones may be accomplished through the use of catalytic amounts of chiral transition metal complexes. In some cases, the transition metal simply serves as a Lewis acid that coordinates to the ketone oxygen; however, some metals (most notably copper) react with hydrosilanes to afford metal hydride intermediates, which act as the active reducing agent.

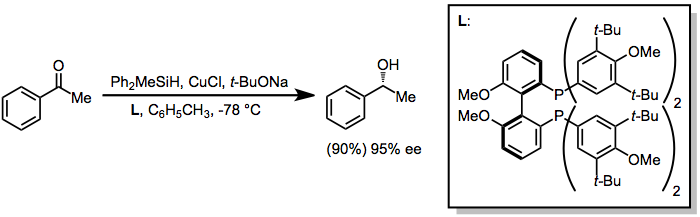

In the presence of rhodium catalyst 1 and rhodium trichloride, 2-phenylcyclohexanone is reduced with no diastereoselectivity but high enantioselectivity.

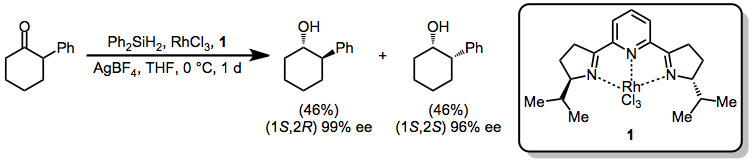

Esters

Esters may be reduced to alcohols under conditions of nucleophilic activation with caesium or potassium fluoride.

Aldehydes undergo hydrosilylation in the presence of hydrosilanes and fluoride. The resulting silyl ethers can be hydrolyzed with 1 M hydrochloric acid. Optimal yields of the hydrosilylation are obtained when the reaction is carried out in very polar solvents.

$\ce{\mathit{n}-C10H21CHO} + {\color{Blue}\ce{PhMe2Si}}\ce{H ->[\ce{TBAF}][\ce{rt}] \mathit{n}-C10H21CH2O}{\color{Blue}\ce{SiMe2Ph}}$	13

$$\begin{array}{lr}
\ce{Solvent} & \ce{Yield}(\%) \\
\hline
\ce{CH2Cl2} & 1\\
\ce{THF} & 9\\
\ce{Me2NCOH} & 56\\
\ce{DMPU} & 89\\
\ce{HMPA} & 91
\end{array}$$

=== Reduction of C=C bonds ===
Hydrosilanes can reduce 1,1-disubstituted double bonds that form stable tertiary carbocations upon protonation. Trisubstituted double bonds may be reduced selectively in the presence of 1,2-disubstituted or monosubstituted alkenes.

Aromatic compounds may be reduced with TFA and triethylsilane. Substituted furans are reduced to tetrahydrofuran derivatives in high yield.

A synthesis of (+)-estrone relies on selective hydrosilane reduction of a conjugated alkene as a key step. The ketone carbonyl and isolated double bond are unaffected under the conditions shown.

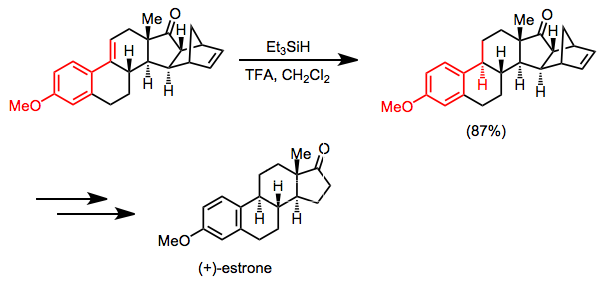

=== Ether cleavage ===
Acetals, ketals, and aminals are reduced in the presence of hydrosilanes and acid. Site-selective reduction of acetals and ketals whose oxygens are inequivalent have been reported—the example below is used in a synthesis of Tamiflu.

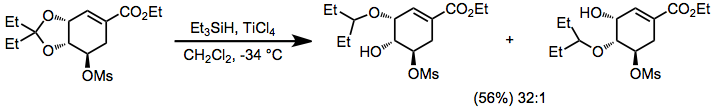

Other functional groups that have been reduced with hydrosilanes include amides, and α,β-unsaturated esters enamines, imines, and azides.

== Safety ==
Trifluoroacetic acid, often used in these reductions, is a strong, corrosive acid. Some hydrosilanes are pyrophoric.
