= Hydrosilanes =

Chemical compounds

Hydrosilanes are tetravalent silicon compounds containing one or more Si-H bond. The parent hydrosilane is silane (SiH_{4}). Commonly, hydrosilane refers to organosilicon derivatives. Examples include phenylsilane (PhSiH_{3}) and triethoxysilane ((C_{2}H_{5}O)_{3}SiH). Polymers and oligomers terminated with hydrosilanes are resins that are used to make useful materials like caulks.

== Synthesis ==
Trichlorosilane is produced commercially by the reaction of hydrogen chloride with silicon:

Si + 3 HCl → HSiCl_{3} + H_{2}

Many alkoxy hydrosilanes are generated by alcoholysis of trichlorosilane. One example is triethoxysilane:

HSiCl_{3} + 3 EtOH → HSi(OEt)_{3} + 3 HCl

Organohydrosilanes can be prepared by partial hydrosilation of silane itself:

SiH_{4} + 3 C_{2}H_{4} → HSi(C_{2}H_{5})_{3}

In the laboratory, hydrosilanes classically are prepared by treating chlorosilanes with hydride reagents, such as lithium aluminium hydride:

4 ClSi(C_{2}H_{5})_{3} + LiAlH_{4} → 4 HSi(C_{2}H_{5})_{3} + LiAlCl_{4}

== Structure ==
The silicon-to-hydrogen bond is longer than the C–H bond (148 compared to 105 pm). The Si-H bond is about 10% weaker compared to C-H bonds.

Bond dissociation energies
| Bond | D (kJ/mol, 298K) |
|---|---|
| H_{3}C-H | 441 |
| H_{3}Si-H | 384 |
| (CH_{3})_{3}C-H | 404 |
| (CH_{3})_{3}Si-H | 397 |
| ((CH_{3})_{3}Si)_{3}Si-H | 351 |

Hydrogen is more electronegative than silicon (hence the naming convention of silyl hydrides), which results in the polarization of the Si-H bond to be the reverse of that for the C-H bond. Generally silyl hydrides are colourless with physical properties (solubility, volatility) comparable to hydrocarbons. They can be pyrophoric, reflecting the great driving force for replacing Si-H bonds with Si-O bonds.

== Reactions and applications ==
Setting aside silane itself, for which is used mainly in the microelectronics industry as a source of Si, hydrosilanes participate in many reactions. Hydrosilanes are mainly used for diverse styles of reduction in both industrial and laboratory-scale reactions. These including deoxygenation, hydrosilylation, and ionic hydrogenation.

=== Hydrosilylation ===
In hydrosilylation, the Si-H bond adds across multiple bonds in alkenes, alkynes, imines, and carbonyls. The reaction of alkenes is commercially significant. Many organosilicon compounds and materials are prepared in this way. Illustrative is the crosslinking of vinyl-terminated siloxanes:

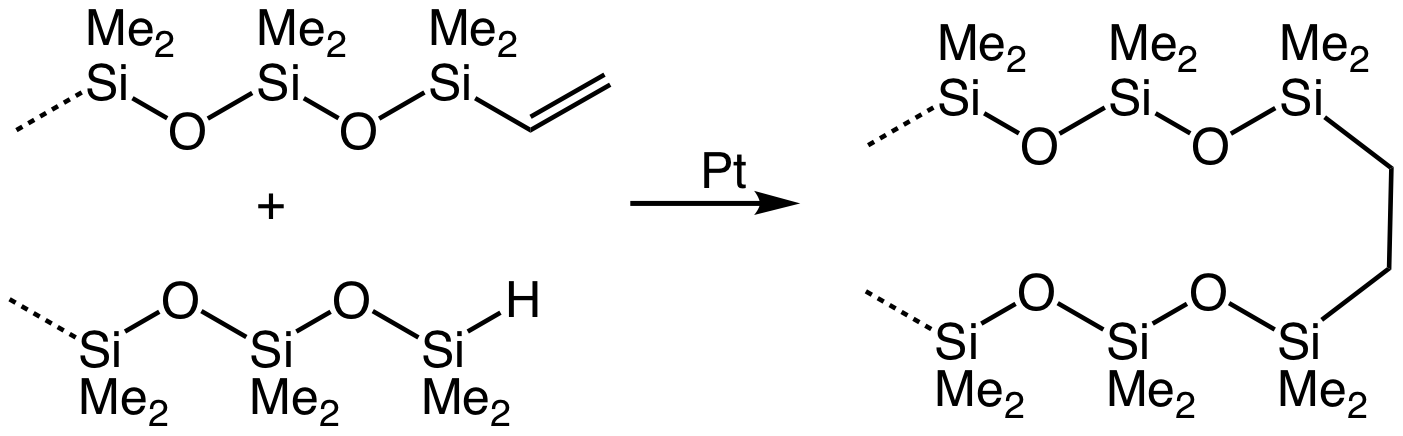
Pt-catalyzed vulcanization of a siloxane resin

=== Conversion to silanols ===
In the presence of platinum-based catalysts, hydrosilanes react with water to give silanols:

R_{3}SiH + H_{2}O → R_{3}SiOH + H_{2}

The same transformation can be effected with oxygen in the presence of catalysts.

=== Fluoride complexes ===
In the presence of fluoride ions, hydrosilanes reversibly form hypervalent fluorosilicates with the formula R_{3}Si(F)H^{−}). These species are reducing agents, akin to borohydride.

=== Ionic hydrogenation ===
Reductions with hydrosilanes are a subset of ionic hydrogenations. In this type of reaction, carbocations are generated by the action of strong Lewis or Brønsted acids in the presence of hydrosilanes, which then transfer hydride. A typical acid is trifluoroacetic acid (TFA).

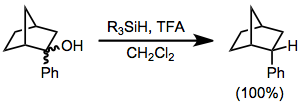

The reaction is stoichiometric.

=== Deoxygenation and ionic hydrogenation ===
Hydrosilanes are used for the deoxygenation of phosphine oxides and sulfoxides.

Hydrosilanes serve as hydride donors in some ionic hydrogenations.

=== Coordination the metals ===
Hydrosilanes form sigma complexes with unsaturated metals. The bonding is similar to that in dihydrogen complexes but stronger. One example is (CH3C5H4)Mn(CO)2(H2SiPh2). Such adducts represent models for and competitors with the oxidative addition of the Si-H bond.

=== Reduction of or addition to organic substrates ===
Akin to the hydrosilylation of alkenes, hydrosilanes add to a variety of unsaturated substrates.

In one example, PMHS. In one study triethylsilane is used in the conversion of a phenyl azide to an aniline:

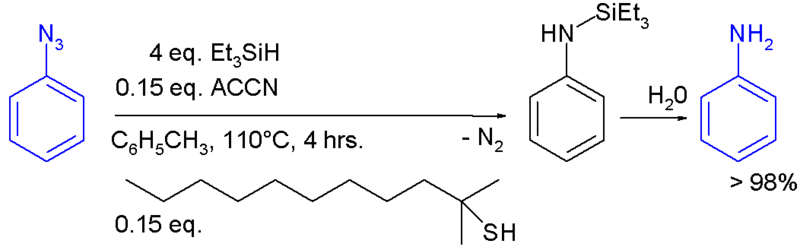

In this reaction ACCN is a radical initiator and an aliphatic thiol transfers radical character to the silylhydride. The triethylsilyl free radical then reacts with the azide with expulsion of nitrogen to a N-silylarylaminyl radical which grabs a proton from a thiol completing the catalytic cycle:

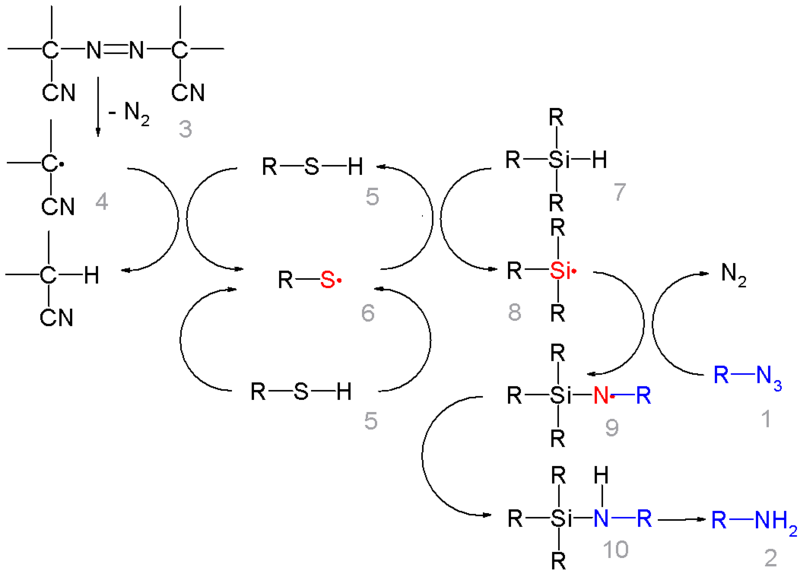

== Selective reading ==
- Ramírez-Oliva, Eulalia; Hernández, Alejandro; Martínez-Rosales, J. Merced; Aguilar-Elguezabal, Alfredo; Herrera-Pérez, Gabriel; Cervantesa, Jorge (2006). "Effect of the synthetic method of Pt/MgO in the hydrosilylation of phenylacetylene". Arkivoc: 126–136. ISSN 1424-6376 – via ResearchGate.
