= Silanization of silicon and mica =

Process

Silanization of silicon and mica is the coating of these materials with a thin layer of self assembling units.

== Biological applications of silanization ==
Nanoscale analysis of proteins using atomic force microscopy (AFM) requires surfaces with well-defined topologies and chemistries for many experimental techniques. Biomolecules, particularly proteins, can be immobilized simply on an unmodified substrate surface through hydrophobic or electrostatic interactions. However, several problems are associated with physical adsorption of proteins on surfaces. With metal surfaces, protein denaturation, unstable and reversible binding, nonspecific and random immobilization of protein have been reported.

One alternative involves the interaction of chemically modified surfaces with proteins under non-denaturing circumstances. Chemical modification of surfaces provides the potential to precisely control the chemistry of the surface, and with the correct chemical modifications, there are several advantages to this approach. First, the proteins adsorbed on the surface are more stable over a wide range of conditions. The proteins also adopt a more uniform orientation on the surface. Additionally, the higher density of protein deposition with greater reproducibility is possible.

Chemical modification of surfaces has been successfully applied in several instances to immobilize biomolecules in order to obtain valuable information. For instance, atomic force microscopy imaging of DNA has been performed using mica coated with 3-aminopropyltriethoxysilane (APTES). The negatively charged DNA backbone bound strongly to the positive charges on the amine functionality, leading to stable structures that could be imaged both in air and in buffer. In a recent study by Behrens et al., amine-terminated silicon surfaces were successfully used to immobilize bone morphogenetic protein 2 (BMP2) for medical purposes (cf. hydrogen-terminated silicon surface). Molecules with amine groups (especially APTES) are important for biological applications, because they allow for simple electrostatic interactions with biomolecules.

== Functionalization of surfaces using self-assembled monolayers ==
Self-assembled monolayers (SAM) are an extremely versatile approach that allows for precise control of surface characteristics. It was introduced in 1946 by Bigelow et al., but it was not until 1983 that it attracted widespread interest, when the formation of SAMs of alkanethiolates on gold was reported by Allara et al. Self-assembly of monolayers can be achieved using several systems. The basis for self-assembly is the formation of a covalent bond between the surface and the molecule forming the layer; and this requirement can be fulfilled using a variety of chemical groups such as organosilanes at hydroxylated materials (glass, silicon, aluminium oxide, mica) and organosulfur-based compounds species at noble metals . While the latter system has been well characterized, much less is known about the behavior of organosilane layers on surfaces and the underlying mechanisms that control monolayer organization and structure.

Although silanization of silicate surfaces was introduced more than 40 years ago, the process of formation of smooth layers on surfaces is still poorly understood. Probably the most important reason for this situation is that a number of studies that have involved silanization as part of the procedure have not been concerned with thoroughly characterizing the silane layer formed. The one result that unifies recent studies on the characterization of silane layers is centered on the extreme sensitivity of the reactions that lead to the formation of silane layers. Indeed, self-assembled layers of silanes on silicate surfaces have been reported to be dependent on various parameters such as humidity, temperature, impurities in the silane reagent and the type of silicate surface. In order to consistently and reproducibly make diverse functionalized surfaces with layers that are molecularly smooth, it is critical to understand the chemistry of the silicate surfaces and the ways in which various parameters affect the nature of the self-assembled layers.

== Surface structure of silicon and mica ==
=== Silicon ===
Oxidized silicon has been extensively studied as a substrate for the deposition of biomolecules. Piranha solution can be used to increase the surface density of reactive hydroxyl groups on the surface of silicon. The –OH groups can hydrolyze and subsequently form siloxane linkages (Si-O-Si) with organic silane molecules. Preparation of silicon surfaces for silanization involves the removal of surface contaminants. This can be achieved by using UV-ozone and piranha solution. Piranha solution in particular constitutes quite a harsh treatment that can potentially damage the integrity of the silicon surface. Finlayson-Pitts et al. investigated the effect of certain treatments on silicon and concluded that both the roughness (3-5 Å) and the presence of scattered large particles were preserved after 1 cycle of plasma-treatment. However, the silicon surface was significantly damaged after 30 cycles of treatment with piranha solution or plasma. In both cases, treatment introduced irregularities and large aggregates on the surface (aggregate size > 80 nm), with the effect being more pronounced when piranha was used. In either case, multiple treatments rendered the surface inadequate for deposition of small biomolecules.

=== Mica ===
Mica is another silicate that is widely used as substrate for the deposition of biomolecules. Mica bears a noticeable advantage over silicon because it is molecularly smooth and hence better suited for studies of small, flat molecules. It has a crystalline structure with generic formula K[Si3Al]O10Al2(OH)2 and contains sheets of octahedral hydroxyl-aluminum sandwiched between two silicon tetrahedral layers. In the silicon layer, one in four silicon atoms is replaced by an aluminum atom, generating a difference in charge that is offset by unbound K+ present in the region between neighboring silicon layers. Muscovite mica is most susceptible to cleavage along the plane located in the potassium layer. When a freshly cleaved mica surface is placed in contact with water, hydrated potassium ions can desorb from the mica surface, leading to a negative charge at the surface.

Similar to silicon, the surface of mica does not contain an appreciable density of silanol groups for covalent attachment by silanes. A recent study reported that freshly cleaved mica carries 11% silanol groups (i.e., approximately 1 in 10 silicon atoms bears a hydroxyl group). Although it is possible that silanization may be carried out using untreated mica, the increased density of surface silanol groups on activated mica can significantly improve covalent attachment of silane molecules to the surface. Mica can be activated by treatment with argon/water plasma, leading to a silanol surface density of 30%. Working with activated surfaces introduces another consideration about the stability of the silanol groups on the activated surfaces. Giasson et al. reported that the silanol groups on freshly cleaved mica that was not subjected to any treatment were found to be more stable under high vacuum compared to the plasma-activated mica: after 64 hrs, surface coverage of the silanol groups for freshly cleaved mica plasma was roughly the same, while surface coverage for activated mica decreased 3-fold to 10%.

== Adsorption of molecules onto silicate surfaces ==
Adsorption describes the process by which molecules or particles bind to surfaces and is distinguishable from absorption, whereby the particles spread in the bulk of the absorbing material. The adsorbed material is called the adsorbate, while the surface is called the adsorbent. It is common to distinguish between two types of adsorption, namely physical adsorption (which consists of intermolecular forces holding the adsorbed material to the surface) and chemical adsorption (which consists of covalent bonds tethering the adsorbed material to the surface). The nature of the layer of adsorbate formed depends on the interactions between the adsorbed material and the adsorbent. More specifically, the mechanisms involved in adsorption include ion exchange (replacement of counter ions adsorbed from the solution by similarly charged ions), ion pairing (adsorption of ions from solution phase onto sites on the substrates that carry the opposite charge), hydrophobic bonding (non-polar attraction between groups on the substrate surface and molecules in solution), polarization of p-electrons polar interactions between partially charged sites on the substrate surface and molecules carrying opposite partial charges in solution, and covalent bonds. The variety of ways for adsorption to occur provides an indication of the complexities associated with controlling the type of layer that is adsorbed.

The type of silane used can further compound the problem, as in the case of APTES. APTES is the classical molecule used for the immobilization of biomolecules and has historically been the most widely studied molecule in the field by far. Since APTES contains three ethoxy groups per molecule, it can polymerize in the presence of water, leading to lateral polymerization between APTES molecules in horizontal and vertical directions and the formation of oligomers and polymers which can attach to the surface.

Self-assembly can be approached using solution-phase reactions or vapor-phase reactions. In solution-phase experiments, the silane is dissolved in an anhydrous solvent and placed in contact with the surface; in vapor-phase experiments, only the vapor of the silane reaches the substrate surface.

== Solution-phase reactions ==
Solution-phase reaction has historically been the method that has been most studied, and a general consensus that has evolved with regards to the conditions required for the formation of smooth aminosilane films includes the following: (1) an anhydrous solvent such as toluene is required, with a rigidly controlled trace amount of water to regulate the degree of polymerization of aminosilanes at the surface and in solution; (2) formation of oligomers and polymers is favored at higher silane concentrations (>10%); (3) moderate temperatures (60–90 °C) can disrupt non-covalent interactions such as hydrogen bonds, leading to fewer silane molecules that are weakly tethered to the surface. Additionally, condition (3) favors desorption of water from the substrate into the toluene phase20; (4) Rinsing with solvents such as toluene, ethanol and water following the silanization reaction favors the removal of weakly bonded silane molecules and the hydrolysis of residual alkoxy linkages in the layer; (5) drying and curing at high temperature (110 °C) favors the formation of siloxane linkages and also converts ammonium ions to the neutral amine, which is more reactive.

== Vapor-phase reactions ==
Vapor-phase silanization has been approached as a way to circumvent the complexities of trace water in solution and silane purity. Since oligomers and polymers of silanes have negligible vapor pressure at the reaction temperatures commonly used, they do not reach the surface of the silicate during deposition. Since there is no solvent in the system, it is easier to control the amount of water in the reaction. Smooth monolayers have been reported for vapor-phase silanizations of several types of silanes, including aminosilanes, octadecyltrimethoxysilane and fluoalkyl silanes. However, the nature of the attachment of the silane molecules to the substrate is uncertain, although siloxane bond formation can be favored by soaking the substrate in water following deposition.

In a recent study by Chen et al., APTES monolayers were obtained consistently at different temperatures and deposition times. The thicknesses of the layers obtained were 5 Å and 6 Å at 70 °C and 90 °C respectively, which corresponds to the approximate length of an APTES molecule and indicates that monolayers formed on the substrates in each case.
