= Si 363 =

Si 363 is a bifunctional organosilane chemical used in the reinforcement of rubber articles, especially tires. SI363 is the trade name of a silane bonding agent in the trialkoxymercaptoalkyl-silane class and of formula SH(CH_{2})H_{3}Si(OCHH_{2}CHH_{3})(O(CHH_{2}CHH_{2}O)H_{5}(CHH_{2})H_{12}CHH_{3})H_{2}.

When applied to tires, Si 363 reduces rolling resistance, thus leading to increased fuel economy. Both alkoxsilicon and sulfur entities are present within its molecular structure.
