= Hydrogen-terminated silicon surface =

Hydrogen-terminated silicon surface is a chemically passivated silicon substrate where the surface Si atoms are bonded to hydrogen. The hydrogen-terminated surfaces are hydrophobic, luminescent, and amenable to chemical modification. Hydrogen-terminated silicon is an intermediate in the growth of bulk silicon from silane: This termination is significant in the semiconductor industry due to its role in preventing oxidation and contamination of silicon surfaces, which is crucial for various applications including microelectronics and nanotechnology.

SiH_{4} → Si + 2 H_{2}

== Preparation ==
Idealized view of Si surface before (top) and after (bottom) treatment with HF. Partially oxidized Si is shown in red, bulk Si in blue.

Silicon wafers are treated with solutions of electronic-grade hydrofluoric acid in water, buffered water, or alcohol. One of the relevant reactions is simply removal of silicon oxides:

SiO_{2} + 4 HF → SiF_{4} + 2 H_{2}O

The key reaction however is the formation of the hydrosilane functional group.

atomic force microscope (AFM) has been used to manipulate hydrogen-terminated silicon surfaces.

== Properties ==
Idealized structure of alkene addition to hydrogen-terminated silicon.

Hydrogen termination removes dangling bonds. All surface Si atoms are tetrahedral. Hydrogen termination confers stability in ambient environments. So again, the surface is both clean (of oxides) and relatively inert. These materials can be handled in air without special care for several minutes.

The Si-H bond in fact is stronger than the Si-Si bonds. Two kinds of Si-H centers are proposed, both featuring terminal Si-H bonds. One kind of site has one Si-H bond. The other kind of site features SiH_{2} centers.

Like organic hydrosilanes, the H-Si groups on the surface react with terminal alkenes and diazo groups. The reaction is called hydrosilylation. Many kinds of organic compounds with various functions can be introduced onto the silicon surface by the hydrosilylation of a hydrogen-terminated surface. The infrared spectrum of hydrogen-terminated silicon shows a band near 2090 cm^{−1}, not very different from νSi-H for organic hydrosilanes.

== Potential applications ==
One group proposed to use the material to create digital circuits made of quantum dots by removing hydrogen atoms from the silicon surface. The hydrogen-terminated silicon surface is widely used in the fabrication of semiconductor devices. It serves as a precursor for various surface functionalization techniques and is also essential in the formation of silicon-on-insulator (SOI) wafers.

== Stability & Reactivity ==
Despite its stability, hydrogen-terminated silicon can gradually oxidize when exposed to air, forming a thin oxide layer. This process can be monitored using techniques such as X-ray photoelectron spectroscopy (XPS) and atomic force microscopy (AFM).

== See also ==
- Silanization of silicon and mica
