= Hapalindole =

Chemical structure of hapalindole A

Hapalindoles are a family of indole alkaloids, representing a large chemical group of tetracyclic or tricyclic, heterocyclic, and highly substituted compounds that are secreted as metabolites in the phylum Cyanobacteria.

== Classification ==
=== Chemical structure ===
Hapalindoles were first described and isolated in 1984 by Richard E. Moore and co-workers. They cited a case where the alga Hapalosiphon intricatus inhibited the growth of another blue-green alga, Anabaena, representing a form of chemical defense. A identical phenomenon, although without structural elucidation at the time, had been described for Hapalosiphon fontinalis against Anabaena oscillarioides.

Numerous names exist for the variants of this chemical framework, which differ in the connectivity or arrangement of carboсycles within tetracyclic, tricyclic, or, less frequently, pentacyclic structures, as well as in the position or substitution of various functional groups. Ultimately, there are approximately 80 different metabolites classified as hapalindoles, fischerindoles, ambiguines, and welwitindolinones. Specifically, hapalindoles feature both tricyclic and tetracyclic skeletons, fischerindoles possess exclusively tetracyclic cores, ambiguines display tetra- and pentacyclic frameworks, and welwitindolinones exhibit a complex bridged core. The core fused ring system is derived from a cis-indole isonitrile fragment and a geranyl monoterpene unit. It shares common structural features, such as a substituted D-ring incorporating late-stage carbon-hydrogen bond functionalization and halogenation.

Hapalindoles are the most common group of compounds within this class of indole alkaloids, counting at least 31 compounds. Most hapalindoles have a three- or four-ring system, highlighting a fused four-ring core with a key bond between the C-4 and C-16 positions. Stereocenters at the C-10, C-11, C-12, and C-15 positions give these structures many possible stereoisomers. There is also a group of tricyclic hapalindoles that lack the carbon-carbon bond between C-4 and C-16, which keeps the structure from becoming tetracyclic. The presence of a halogen or a hydroxyl group in some compounds is also characteristic.

Fischerindoles, first described and isolated from the alga Fischerella muscicola in 1992 by Moore and co-workers, represent compounds related to hapalindoles. They largely share characteristics and properties typical of hapalindoles, such as a four-ring polycyclic system, stereocenters at the C-10, C-11, C-12, and C-15 positions, and the presence of a halogen or oxidation in some compounds. The difference is that the key bond is now formed between the C-2 and C-16 positions, rather than C-4 and C-16. Later, in 2012, Orjala's group discovered that certain fischerindoles contain a nitrile group instead of the isonitrile characteristic of many others, although a nitrile group had previously been observed only in ambiguines.

== See also ==
- Ergolines
