= (3-Mercaptopropyl)trimethoxysilane =

Names
- Preferred IUPAC name 3-(trimethoxysilyl)propane-1-thiol
- Other names 3-Trimethoxysilyl-1-propanethiol; 3-(trimethoxysilyl)propanethiol 3-(trimethoxysilyl)propane-1-thiol

Identifiers
CAS Number	4420-74-0
3D model (JSmol)	Interactive image
ChEMBL	ChEMBL3185147
ChemSpider	19280
ECHA InfoCard	100.022.354
EC Number	224-588-5
PubChem CID	20473
UNII	8CB1M08OIW
CompTox Dashboard (EPA)	DTXSID2044428
- InChI: InChI=1S/C6H16O3SSi/c1-7-11(8-2,9-3)6-4-5-10/h10H,4-6H2,1-3H3 Key: UUEWCQRISZBELL-UHFFFAOYSA-N
- SMILES: CO[Si](CCCS)(OC)OC

Properties
Chemical formula	C_{6}H_{16}O_{3}SSi
Molar mass	196.34 g·mol^{−1}
Appearance	Colorless liquid with a stench
Density	1.057 g/cm^{3}
Boiling point	213 °C (415 °F; 486 K)
Solubility in water	Insoluble but hydrolyzes/reacts over time
Solubility	Soluble in alcohols, ketones, aliphatic/aromatic hydrocarbons
Refractive index (n_{D})	1.44

Hazards
- Occupational safety and health (OHS/OSH)
Main hazards	skin sensitization severe eye irritation harmful if swallowed
- GHS labelling
Pictograms	(GHS07: Exclamation mark) (GHS09: Environmental hazard)
Signal word	Warning
Hazard statements	H302, H312, H317, H319, H411
Precautionary statements	P261, P264, P264+P265, P270, P272, P273, P280, P301+P317, P302+P352, P305+P351+P338, P317, P321, P330, P333+P317, P337+P317, P362+P364, P391, P501
- Except where otherwise noted, data are given for materials in their standard state (at 25 °C [77 °F], 100 kPa). Infobox references

In polymer chemistry, (3-mercaptopropyl)trimethoxysilane (MPTMS) is a hybrid organic compound used as a monomer in organosilicon reactions. It consists of a central silicon core atom surrounded by three methoxy groups [-OCH_{3}] and one mercaptopropyl [-C_{3}H_{6}SH] substituent groups. The center, silicon core allows for easy incorporation into organic and inorganic materials, and the thiol group allows for biocompatibility and excellent reactivity.

== Synthesis ==
At an industrial scale, MPTMS is commonly synthesized through the thiolation of (3-chloropropyl)trimethoxysilane (CPTMS) with either sodium hydrosulfide (NaSH) or thiourea through biomolecular nucleophilic substitution. The multistep synthesis usually takes place in methanol over a period of 5–24 hours resulting in the thionation of the CPTMS chlorine atom with a sulfur atom. One of the possible methods is shown below:

$$\ce{{NaSH} + {CPTMS} ->[{\mathrm{MeOH}}]} \ce{{MPTMS} + {NaCl}}$$

A faster avenue of synthesis, done in lab settings, involves adding CPTMS dropwise into dimethylformamide (DMF) solution containing NaSH and heating the solution at 110 °C for 45 minutes.

$$\ce{{NaSH} + {CPTMS} ->[{\mathrm{DMF}}]} \ce{{MPTMS} + {NaCl}}$$

Alternative synthesis routes include using phase transfer catalysts like benzyltributylammonium chloride (BTBAC) or using UV photoinitiators like 2,2-dimethoxy-2-phenylacetophenone (DMPA) to drive the conversion. All methods require purification of crude MPTMS with vacuum filtration and the addition of a polymerization inhibitor to the solution.

== Polymerization procedures ==
In polymerization chemistry, MPTMS monomers have two polymerization pathways to utilize. One pathway uses the core Si and the methoxy groups to react in sol-gel silanization creating a Si-O-Si siloxane backbone and allowing MPTMS to graft onto inorganic surfaces. These gel polymers may also link together creating partial silsesquioxane networks or full silsesquioxane cages.

The terminal sulfur on the mercaptopropyl group can be utilized as a bridge to other polymers, attach to surfaces, and can prepare nanocomposite materials via thiol-ene reactions. These polymerizations are often initiated with UV reactive photoinitiators that “click” the sulfur to a corresponding alkene. The terminal sulfur may also be left free to act as an anchor for nitric oxide or other medically relevant molecules.

=== Applications and uses ===
MPTMS is commonly used in biosensing applications as a surface functionalization reagent, a component of multilayer interfaces for immobilization of biomolecules, and permselective membrane material. It is so versatile due to the thiol group that provides a reactive handle for surface attachment and the trimethoxysilane group that allows the formation of a stable silane-based film on an oxide or metal-supported surface.

In the use of a permselective membrane, MPTMS was attached to platinum electrodes and compared to Nafion as a protective layer. MPTMS’s inclusion inhibited interference from common electroactive species like ascorbic acid and uric acid while allowing the target analyte to be detected. A study showed that MPTMS-based electrodes produced significantly lower interference than the Nafion based ones. This is important in electrochemical sensors where background species can obscure the response. This same study showed that MPTMS can support a glucose biosensor. A platinum electrode was prepared with glucose oxidase, immobilized with polyaniline and modified by MPTMS which acted as a selective layer that improved that electrochemical environment. It was found that the applied potential of 0.4V gave the best signal generation with minimal interference.

MPTMS can be used to produce thiol films that can be modified with aptamers or proteins. These films can help improve biosensing performance, which depends on the number of reacting groups, the stability of the coating, and how well the recognition elements are oriented for binding. With this, it can also serve as an anchor for coupling reactions. This is helpful when trying to measure proteins, antibodies, enzymes, and DNA which can be attached firmly to a surface using MPTMS as a link layer between the substrate and the biological recognition component.

MPTMS is also being used to treat mesoporous silica to produce a material capable of removing heavy metals from aqueous and non aqueous waste as a stable and regeneratable material. It is one of three components used in the process of forming thio-organosilica nanoparticles, and it can modify glass substrates to speed up the process of depositing CdS films through successive ionic layer adsorption and reaction (SILAR).
