= Agostic interaction =

Formation of a 3-center 2-electron bond between a transition metal and C–H bond

In organometallic chemistry, agostic interaction refers to the intramolecular interaction of a coordinatively-unsaturated transition metal with an appropriately situated C−H bond on one of its ligands. The interaction is the result of two electrons involved in the C−H bond interaction with an empty d-orbital of the transition metal, resulting in a three-center two-electron bond. It is a special case of a C–H sigma complex. Historically, agostic complexes were the first examples of C–H sigma complexes to be observed spectroscopically and crystallographically, due to intramolecular interactions being particularly favorable and more often leading to robust complexes. Many catalytic transformations involving oxidative addition and reductive elimination are proposed to proceed via intermediates featuring agostic interactions. Agostic interactions are observed throughout organometallic chemistry in alkyl, alkylidene, and polyenyl ligands.

== History ==
The term agostic, derived from the Ancient Greek word for "to hold close to oneself", was coined by Maurice Brookhart and Malcolm Green, on the suggestion of the classicist Jasper Griffin, to describe this and many other interactions between a transition metal and a C−H bond. Often such agostic interactions involve alkyl or aryl groups that are held close to the metal center through an additional σ-bond.

Short interactions between hydrocarbon substituents and coordinatively unsaturated metal complexes have been noted since the 1960s. For example, in tris(triphenylphosphine) ruthenium dichloride, a short interaction is observed between the ruthenium(II) center and a hydrogen atom on the ortho position of one of the nine phenyl rings. Complexes of borohydride are described as using the three-center two-electron bonding model.

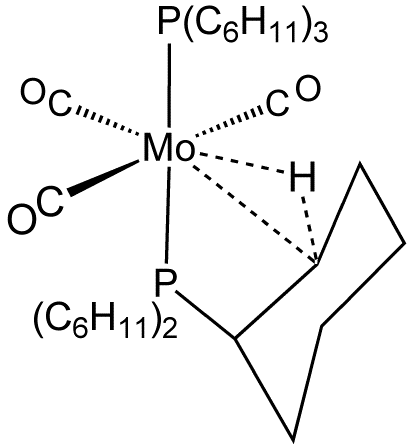
Mo(PCy_{3})_{2}(CO)_{3}, featuring an agostic interaction

The nature of the interaction was foreshadowed in main group chemistry in the structural chemistry of trimethylaluminium.

== Characteristics of agostic bonds ==
Agostic interactions are best demonstrated by crystallography. Neutron diffraction data have shown that C−H and M┄H bond distances are 5-20% longer than expected for isolated metal hydride and hydrocarbons. The distance between the metal and the hydrogen is typically 1.8–2.3 Å, and the M┄H−C angle is in the range of 90°–140°. The presence of a ^{1}H NMR signal that is shifted upfield from that of a normal aryl or alkane, often to the region normally assigned to hydride ligands. The coupling constant ^{1}J_{CH} is typically lowered to 70–100 Hz versus the 125 Hz expected for a normal sp^{3} carbon–hydrogen bond.

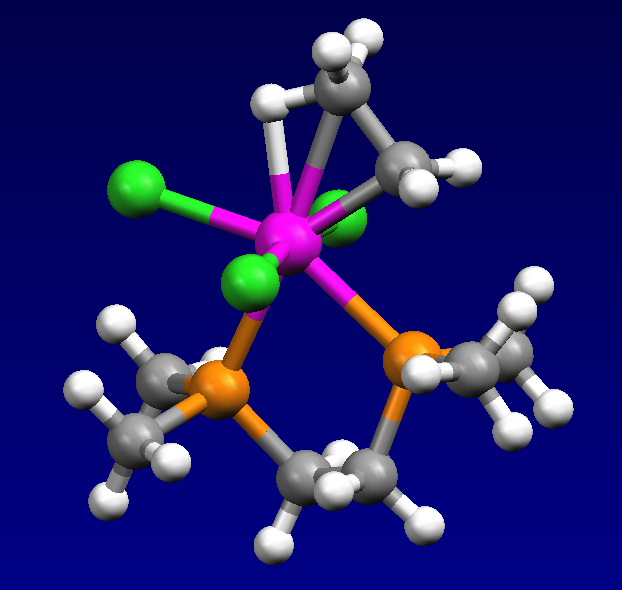
Structure of (C_{2}H_{5})TiCl_{3}(dmpe), highlighting an agostic interaction between the methyl group and the Ti(IV) center.

=== Strength of bond ===
On the basis of experimental and computational studies, the stabilization arising from an agostic interaction is estimated to be 10–15 kcal/mol. Recent calculations using compliance constants point to a weaker stabilisation (<10 kcal/mol). Thus, agostic interactions are stronger than most hydrogen bonds. Agostic bonds sometimes play a role in catalysis by increasing 'rigidity' in transition states. For instance, in Ziegler–Natta catalysis the highly electrophilic metal center has agostic interactions with the growing polymer chain. This increased rigidity influences the stereoselectivity of the polymerization process.

== Related bonding interactions ==
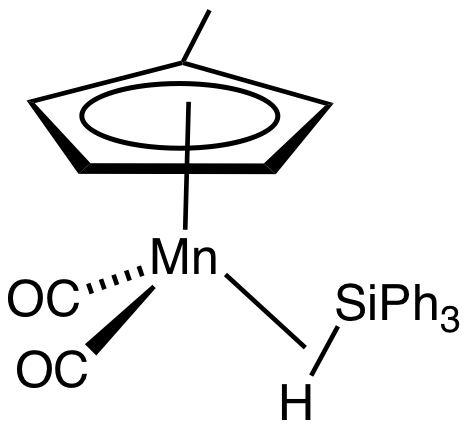
A sigma complex derived from (MeC_{5}H_{4})Mn(CO)_{3} and triphenylsilane.

The term agostic is reserved to describe two-electron, three-center bonding interactions between carbon, hydrogen, and a metal. Two-electron three-center bonding is clearly implicated in the complexation of H_{2}, e.g., in W(CO)_{3}(PCy_{3})_{2}H_{2}, which is closely related to the agostic complex shown in the figure. Silane binds to metal centers often via agostic-like, three-centered Si┄H−M interactions. Because these interactions do not include carbon, however, they are not classified as agostic.

=== Anagostic bonds ===
Certain M┄H−C interactions are not classified as agostic but are described by the term anagostic. Anagostic interactions are more electrostatic in character. In terms of structures of anagostic interactions, the M┄H distances and M┄H−C angles fall into the ranges 2.3–2.9 Å and 110°–170°, respectively.

== Function ==
Agostic interactions serve a key function in alkene polymerization and stereochemistry, as well as migratory insertion.
