= Bifunctionality =

Organic molecule with two different functional groups

In chemistry, bifunctionality or difunctionality is the presence of two functional groups in a molecule. A bifunctional species has the properties of each of the two types of functional groups, such as an alcohol (−OH), amide (−CONH_{2}), aldehyde (−CHO), nitrile (−CN) or carboxylic acid (−COOH). Many bifunctional species are used to produce complex materials. They participate in condensation polymerization like polyester and polyamide.

Polyfunctional species have more than two functional groups. Most biological compounds are polyfunctional.

== See also ==
- Functionality (chemistry)
