= Sigma complex =

This dihydrogen complex ([HFe(H_{2})(dppe)_{2}]^{+}) is an example of a sigma complex.

In chemistry, a sigma complex or σ-complex usually refers to a family of coordination complexes where one or more ligands interact with the metal using the bonding electrons in a sigma bond. Transition metal silane complexes are often especially stable sigma complexes. A particularly common subset of sigma complexes are those featuring an agostic interaction where a C–H σ-bond on one of its ligands 'leans' towards and interacts with the coordinatively unsaturated metal center to form a chelate. Transition metal alkane complexes (e.g., a methane complex) that bind solely through the C–H bond are also known but structurally characterized examples are rare, as C–H σ-bonds are generally poor electron donors, and, in many cases, the weakened C–H bond cleaves completely (C–H oxidative addition) to form a complex of type M(R)(H). In some cases, even C–C bonds function as sigma ligands.

== Significance ==
Sigma complexes are of great mechanistic significance, despite their frequent fragility. They represent an initial interaction between the metal center and a hydrocarbon substrate. As such, sigma complexes are generally assumed to be intermediates prior to full oxidative addition.

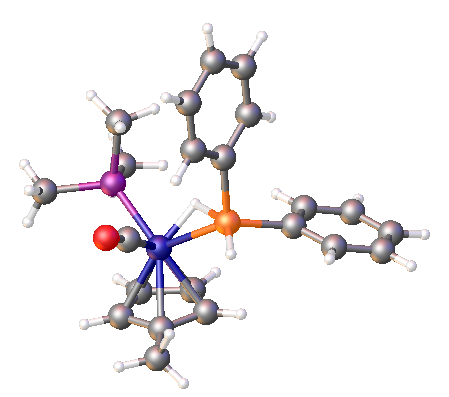
Structure of (MeC_{5}H_{4})Mn(CO)(PMe_{3})(η^{2}-H_{2}SiPh_{2}, a sigma complex of diphenylsilane. Selected distances: Si-Mn = 325, H-Fe = 149, Si-H(Mn) = 177, Si-H_{terminal} = 135 picometer.

== Types of sigma complexes ==
=== Wheland complex ===
The Wheland complex is an intermediate in the electrophilic substitution reaction on an aromatic compound.

==== Example - Halogenation of benzene ====
In the halogenation of benzene, the sigma complex comprises the six carbon atoms of the benzene ring, each bonded to a hydrogen atom. An additional halogen atom is bonded to one of the carbon atoms, which is sp^{3}-hybridized, while the other carbons remain sp^{2}-hybridized. In this state, the ring loses its aromaticity and acquires a positive charge, with the charge delocalized across the ring.

=== Sigma complexes with agostic interactions ===
Sigma complexes with agostic interactions represent a particularly common subgroup of sigma complexes. In these, a C-H-σ bond from one of the ligands interacts with the coordinatively unsaturated metal center, forming a chelate complex.

=== Transition metal-alkane complexes ===
Transition metal-alkane complexes bind exclusively through the C-H bond.

Structurally characterized examples are rare, as C-H σ-bonds generally act as weak electron donors. In many cases, the weakened C-H bond undergoes complete cleavage (oxidative C-H addition).
