= Compliance constants =

Elements of an inverted Hessian matrix

Compliance constants are the elements of an inverted Hessian matrix. The calculation of compliance constants provides an alternative description of chemical bonds in comparison with the widely used force constants explicitly ruling out the dependency on the coordinate system. They provide the unique description of the mechanical strength for covalent and non-covalent bonding. While force constants (as energy second derivatives) are usually given in aJ/Å^{2} or N/cm, compliance constants are given in Å^{2}/aJ or Å / mdyn.

== History ==
Hitherto, recent publications that broke the wall of putative chemical understanding and presented detection/isolation of novel compounds with intriguing bonding characters can still be provocative at times. The stir in such discoveries arose partly from the lack of a universally accepted bond descriptor. While bond dissociation energies (BDE) and rigid force constants have been generally regarded as primary tools for such interpretation, they are prone to flawed definition of chemical bonds in certain scenarios whether simple or controversial.

Such reasons prompted the necessity to seek an alternative approach to describe covalent and non-covalent interactions more rigorously. Jörg Grunenberg, a German chemist at the TU Braunschweig and his Ph.D. student at the time, Kai Brandhorst, developed a program COMPLIANCE (freely available to the public), which harnesses compliance constants for tackling the aforementioned tasks. The authors use an inverted matrix of force constants, i.e., inverted Hessian matrix, originally introduced by W. T. Taylor and K. S. Pitzer. The insight in choosing the inverted matrix is from the realization that not all elements in the Hessian matrix are necessary—and thus redundant—for describing covalent and non-covalent interactions. Such redundancy is common for many molecules, and more importantly, it ushers in the dependence of the elements of the Hessian matrix on the choice of coordinate system. Therefore, the author claimed that force constants albeit more widely used are not an appropriate bond descriptor whereas non-redundant and coordinate system-independent compliance constants are.

== Theory ==
=== Force constants ===
By Taylor series expansion, the potential energy, $V$, of any molecule can be expressed as:

$V = V_0 + G^TZ + {1 \over 2}Z^THZ + ...$ (eq. 1)

where $Z$ is a column vector of arbitrary and fully determined displacement coordinates, and $G$ and $H$ are the corresponding gradient (first derivative of $V$) and Hessian (second derivative of $V$), respectively. The point of interest is the stationary point on a potential energy surface (PES), so $G$ is treated as zero, and by considering the relative energy, $V_0$ as well becomes zero. By assuming harmonic potential and regarding the third derivative term and forth as negligible, the potential energy formula then simply becomes:

$V = {1 \over 2}Z^THZ$ (eq. 2)

Transitioning from cartesian coordinates $Z$ to internal coordinates $Q$, which are more commonly used for the description of molecular geometries, gives rise to equation 3:

$V = {1 \over 2}Q^TH_qQ$ (eq. 3)

where $H_q$ is the corresponding Hessian for internal coordinates (commonly referred to as force constants), and it is in principle determined by the frequencies of a sufficient set of isotopic molecules. Since the Hessian $H_q$ is the second derivative of the energy with respect to displacements and that is the same as the first derivative of the force, evaluation of this property as shown in equation 4 is often used to describe chemical bonds.

$H_q = \biggl({\partial^2V\over\partial Q_i\partial Q_j}\biggr)_0$ (eq. 4)

Nevertheless, there are several issues with this method as explained by Grunenberg, including the dependence of force constants on the choice of internal coordinates and the presence of the redundant Hessian which has no physical meaning and consequently engenders ill-defined description of bond strength.

=== Compliance constants ===
Rather than internal displacement coordinates, an alternative approach to write the potential energy of a molecule as explained by Decius is to write it as a quadratic form in terms of generalized displacement forces (negative gradient) $G_q$.

$V = {1 \over 2}{G_q}^TCG_q$ (eq. 5)

This gradient $G_q$ is the first derivative of the potential energy with respect to the displacement coordinates, which can be expressed as shown:

$G_q = H_qQ$ (eq. 6)

By substituting the expression of $G_q$ in eq. 5 into equation 5, equation 7 is obtained.

$V = {1 \over 2}Q^T{H_q}^TCH_qQ$ (eq. 7)

Thus, with the knowledge that $H_q$ is positive definite, the only possible value of $C$ which is the compliance matrix then must be:

$C = {H_q}^{-1}$ (eq. 8)

Equation 7 offers a surrogate formulation of the potential energy which proves to be significantly advantageous in defining chemical bonds. Specially, this method is independent on coordinate selection and also eliminates such issue with redundant Hessian that the common force constant calculation method suffers with. Intriguingly, compliance constants calculation can be employed regardless of the redundancy of the coordinates.

== Archetype of compliance constants calculation ==
=== Cyclobutane: force constants calculations ===
To illustrate how choices of coordinate systems for calculations of chemical bonds can immensely affect the results and consequently engender ill-defined descriptors of the bonds, sample calculations for n-butane and cyclobutane are shown in this section. Note that it is known that the all the four equivalent C-C bonds in cyclobutane are weaker than any of the two distinct C-C bonds in n-butane; therefore, juxtaposition and evaluation of the strength of the C-C bonds in this C4 system can exemplify how force constants fail and how compliance constants do not. The tables immediately below are results that are calculated at MP2/aug-cc-pvtz level of theory based on typical force constants calculation.

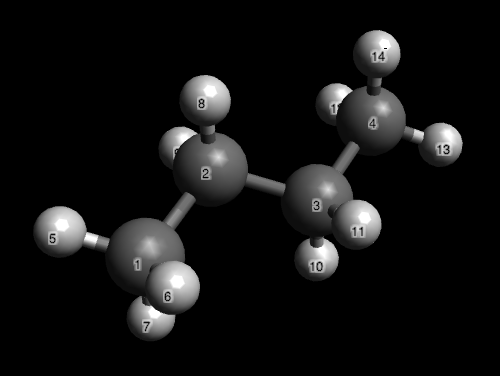
Table 1. Force constants (N/cm) of n-butane in natural internal coordinates and z-matrix coordinates n-butane
Natural Internal Coordinates				Z-matrix Coordinates			
	1-2	2-3	3-4		1-2	2-3	3-4
1-2	4.708			1-2	4.708		
2-3	0.124	4.679		2-3	0.124	4.679	
3-4	0.016	0.124	4.708	3-4	0.016	0.124	4.708

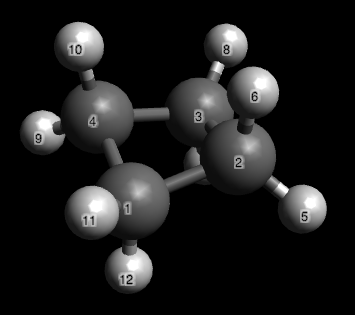
Table 2. Force constants (N/cm) of cyclobutane in natural internal coordinates and z-matrix coordinates cyclobutane
Natural Internal Coordinates					Z-matrix Coordinates				
	1-2	2-3	3-4	4-1		1-2	2-3	3-4	4-1
1-2	4.173				1-2	4.914			
2-3	0.051	4.173			2-3	-0.459	4.906		
3-4	0.155	0.051	4.173		3-4	-0.864	0.813	5.504	
4-1	0.051	0.155	0.051	4.173	4-1	0.786	-0.771	-0.976	5.340

Tables 1 and 2 display a force constant in N/cm between each pair of carbon atoms (diagonal) as well as the coupling (off-diagonal). Considering natural internal coordinates on the left, the results make chemical sense. Firstly, the C-C bonds are n-butane are generally stronger than those in cyclobutane, which is in line with what is expected. Secondly, the C-C bonds in cyclobutane are equivalent with the force constant values of 4.173 N/cm. Lastly, there is little coupling between the force constants as seen as the small compliance coupling constants in the off-diagonal terms.

However, when z-matrix coordinates are used, the results are different from those obtained from natural internal coordinates and become erroneous. The four C-C bonds all have distinct values in cyclobutane, and the coupling becomes much more pronounced. Significantly, the force constants of the C-C bonds in cyclobutane here are also larger than those of n-butane, which is in conflict with chemical intuition. Clearly for cyclobutane—and numerous other molecules, using force constants therefore gives rise to inaccurate bond descriptors due to its dependence on coordinate systems.

=== Cyclobutane: compliance constants calculations ===
A more accurate approach as claimed by Grunenberg is to exploit compliance constants as means for describing chemical bonds as shown below.

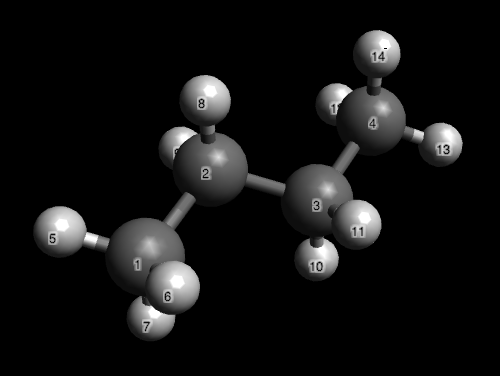
Table 3. Compliance constants (N^{−1}) of n-butane in natural internal coordinates and z-matrix coordinates n-butane
Natural Internal Coordinates				Z-matrix Coordinates			
	1-2	2-3	3-4		1-2	2-3	3-4
1-2	0.230			1-2	0.230		
2-3	-0.010	0.233		2-3	-0.010	0.233	
3-4	0.002	-0.010	0.230	3-4	0.002	-0.010	0.230

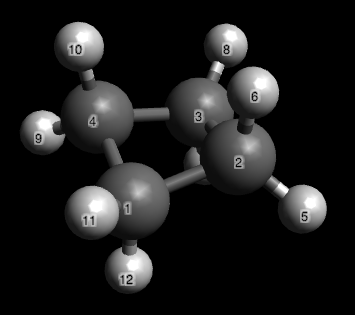
Table 4. Compliance constants (N^{−1}) of cyclobutane in natural internal coordinates and z-matrix coordinates cyclobutane
Natural Internal Coordinates					Z-matrix Coordinates				
	1-2	2-3	3-4	4-1		1-2	2-3	3-4	4-1
1-2	0.255				1-2	0.255			
2-3	-0.006	0.255			2-3	-0.006	0.255		
3-4	-0.010	-0.006	0.255		3-4	-0.010	-0.006	0.255	
4-1	-0.006	-0.010	-0.006	0.255	4-1	-0.006	-0.010	-0.006	0.255

All the calculated compliance constants above are given in N^{−1} unit. For both n-butane and cyclobutane, the results are the same regardless of the choice of the coordinate systems. One aspect of compliance constants that proves more powerful than force constants in cyclobutane is because of less coupling. This compliance coupling constants are the off-diagonal elements in the inverted Hessian matrix and altogether with the compliance constants, they physically describe the relaxed distortion of a molecule closely through a minimum energy path. Moreover, the values of the compliance constants yield the same results for all the C-C bonds and the values are less compared to those obtained for n-butane. Compliance constants, thus, give results that are in accordance to what are generally known about the ring strain of cyclobutane.

== Applications to main group compounds ==
=== Diboryne ===
Diboryne or a compound with boron-boron triple bond was first isolated as a N-heterocyclic carbene supported complex (NHC-BB-NHC) in the Braunschweig group, and its unique, peculiar bonding structure thereupon catalyzed new research to computationally assess the nature of this at that time controversial triple bond.

A few years later, Köppe and Schnöckel published an article arguing that the B-B bond should be defined as a 1.5 bond based on thermodynamic view and rigid force constant calculations. That same year, Grunenberg reassessed the B-B bond using generalized compliance constants of which he claimed better suited as a bond strength descriptor.

Relaxed force constant of B-B bonds supported by NHC ligands computed at BP86/dz level of theory
Compound	Relaxed Force Constant (mdyn / Å)	Bond
NHC-H_{2}BBH_{2}-NHC	1.5	single
NHC-HBBH-NHC	3.8	double
NHC-BB-NHC	6.5	triple

The calculated relaxed force constants show a clear trend as the bond order between the B-B bond increases, which advocates the existence of the triple bond in Braunschweig's compound.

=== Digallium bonds ===
Grunenberg and N. Goldberg probed the bond strength of a Ga-Ga triple bond by calculating the compliance constants of digallium complexes with a single bond, a double bond, or a triple bond. The results show that the Ga-Ga triple bond of a model Na_{2}[H-GaGa-H] compound in C_{2h} symmetry has a compliance constant value of 0.870 aJ/Å^{2} is in fact weaker than a Ga-Ga double bond (1.201 aJ/Å^{2}).

=== Watson-Crick base pairs ===
Besides chemical bonds, compliance constants are also useful for determining non-covalent bonds, such as H-bonds in Watson-Crick base pairs. Grunenberg calculated the compliance constant for each of the donor-H⋯acceptor linkages in AT and CG base pairs and found that the central N-H⋯N bond in CG base pair is the strongest one with the compliance constant value of 2.284 Å / mdyn. (Note that the unit is reported in a reverse unit.) In addition, one of the three hydrogen bonding interactions in a AT base pair shows an extremely large compliance value of >20 Å / mdyn indicative of a weak interaction.
