= Functionality (chemistry) =

Presence of functional groups within a molecule

Monofunctional compounds

Methyl acetate

Thiophenol

Ethylamine

Difunctional compounds

Malonic acid

Ethanolamine

Glycine

Trifunctional compounds

Glycerol

(R)-Cysteine

In chemistry, functionality is the presence of functional groups in a molecule. A monofunctional molecule possesses one functional group, a bifunctional (or difunctional) two, a trifunctional three, and so forth. In organic chemistry (and other fields of chemistry), a molecule's functionality has a decisive influence on its reactivity.

In polymer chemistry, the functionality of a monomer refers to its number of polymerizable groups, and affects the formation and the degree of crosslinking of polymers.

== In organic chemistry and material science ==
In organic chemistry, functionality is often used as a synonym for functional group. For example, a hydroxyl group can also be called a HO-function.

Functionalisation means the introduction of functional groups, for example

- the functionalisation of a surface (e.g. silanization for the specific modification of the adhesion of a surface)
- the functionalization of nanoparticles of a metal or metal oxide to stabilize such nanoparticles or
- the so-called C-H functionalization, which means the substitution of a C-H bond by a functional group, bonded at the same carbon atom

== In polymer chemistry ==
According to IUPAC, the functionality of a monomer is defined as the number of bonds that a monomer's repeating unit forms in a polymer with other monomers. Thus in the case of a functionality of f = 2 a linear polymer is formed by polymerizing (a thermoplastic). Monomers with a functionality f ≥ 3 lead to a branching point, which can lead to cross-linked polymers (a thermosetting polymer). Monofunctional monomers do not exist as such molecules lead to a chain termination.

From the average functionality of the used monomers the reaching of the gel point can be calculated as a function of reaction progress. Side reactions may increase or decrease the functionality.

However, IUPAC definition and the use of the term in organic chemistry differ with respect to the functionality of a double bond. In polymer chemistry, a double bond possesses a functionality of two (because two points of contact for further polymer chains are present, on each of the two adjacent carbon atoms), while in organic chemistry the double bond is a functional group and thus has a functionality of one.
