= (3-Aminopropyl)triethoxysilane =

- Structural formula of (3-aminopropyl)triethoxysilane

Names
- Preferred IUPAC name 3-(Triethoxysilyl)propan-1-amine
- Other names Aminopropyltriethoxysilane

Identifiers
CAS Number	919-30-2
3D model (JSmol)	Interactive image
ChemSpider	12933
ECHA InfoCard	100.011.863
PubChem CID	13521
UNII	L8S6UBW552
CompTox Dashboard (EPA)	DTXSID2027333
- InChI: InChI=1S/C9H23NO3Si/c1-4-11-14(12-5-2,13-6-3)9-7-8-10/h4-10H2,1-3H3 Key: WYTZZXDRDKSJID-UHFFFAOYSA-N; InChI=1/C9H23NO3Si/c1-4-11-14(12-5-2,13-6-3)9-7-8-10/h4-10H2,1-3H3 Key: WYTZZXDRDKSJID-UHFFFAOYAI
- SMILES: CCO[Si](CCCN)(OCC)OCC

Properties
Chemical formula	C_{9}H_{23}NO_{3}Si
Molar mass	221.372 g·mol^{−1}
Density	0.946 g/mL
Melting point	−70 °C (−94 °F; 203 K)
Boiling point	217 °C (423 °F; 490 K)

Hazards
- GHS labelling
Pictograms	(GHS05: Corrosive) (GHS07: Exclamation mark)
Signal word	Danger
Hazard statements	H227, H302, H313, H315, H318
Precautionary statements	P280, P305+P351+P338
NFPA 704 (fire diamond)	3 1 0
Flash point	98 °C (208 °F; 371 K)
Explosive limits	0.8%(V) Lower; 4.5%(V) Upper
- Lethal dose or concentration (LD, LC)
LD_{50} (median dose)	1,780 mg/kg (oral in rats); 3.8 g/kg (Dermal exposure in rabbits)
Safety data sheet (SDS)	External MSDS
- Except where otherwise noted, data are given for materials in their standard state (at 25 °C [77 °F], 100 kPa). Infobox references

(3-Aminopropyl)triethoxysilane (APTES) is an aminosilane frequently used in the process of silanization, the functionalization of surfaces with alkoxysilane molecules. It can also be used for covalent attaching of organic films to metal oxides such as silica and titania.

== Use with PDMS ==
APTES can be used to covalently bond thermoplastics to poly(dimethylsiloxane) (PDMS). Thermoplastics are treated with oxygen plasma to functionalize surface molecules, and subsequently coated with an aqueous 1% by volume APTES solution. PDMS is treated with oxygen plasma and placed in contact with the functionalized thermoplastic surface. A stable, covalent bond forms within 2 minutes.

== Silsesquioxane synthesis ==
Octa(3-aminopropyl)silsesquioxane can be obtained in a one step hydrolytic condensation using APTES and hydrochloric or trifluoromethanesulfonic acid (CF_{3}SO_{3}H).

== Use with cell cultures ==
APTES-functionalized surfaces have been shown to be nontoxic to embryonic rat cardiomyocytes in vitro. Further experimentation is needed to evaluate toxicity to other cell types in extended culture.

== Toxicity ==
APTES is a toxic compound with an MSDS health hazard score of 3. APTES fumes are destructive to the mucous membranes and the upper respiratory tract, and should be used in a fume hood with gloves. If a fume hood is not available, a face shield and full face respirator must be implemented. The target organs of APTES are nerves, liver and kidney.
