= Triethoxysilane =

Names
- Preferred IUPAC name Triethoxysilane

Identifiers
CAS Number	998-30-1
3D model (JSmol)	Interactive image
ChemSpider	13230
ECHA InfoCard	100.012.409
EC Number	213-650-7
PubChem CID	13830
UNII	8T460WDH89
CompTox Dashboard (EPA)	DTXSID6052667
- InChI: InChI=1S/C6H16O3Si/c1-4-7-10(8-5-2)9-6-3/h10H,4-6H2,1-3H3 Key: QQQSFSZALRVCSZ-UHFFFAOYSA-N; InChI=1/C6H16O3Si/c1-4-7-10(8-5-2)9-6-3/h10H,4-6H2,1-3H3 Key: QQQSFSZALRVCSZ-UHFFFAOYAP
- SMILES: O(CC)[SiH](OCC)OCC

Properties
Chemical formula	C_{6}H_{16}O_{3}Si
Molar mass	164.276 g·mol^{−1}
Appearance	colourless liquid
Density	0.89 g/cm^{3}
Boiling point	134–135 °C (273–275 °F; 407–408 K)
Solubility in water	organic solvents
- Except where otherwise noted, data are given for materials in their standard state (at 25 °C [77 °F], 100 kPa). Infobox references

Triethoxysilane is an organosilicon compound with the formula HSi(OC_{2}H_{5})_{3}. It is a colourless liquid used in precious metal-catalysed hydrosilylation reactions. The resulting triethoxysilyl groups are often valued for attachment to silica surfaces. Compared to most compounds with Si-H bonds, triethoxysilane exhibits relatively low reactivity. Like most silyl ethers, triethoxysilane is susceptible to hydrolysis. As reducing agent, triethoxysilane can for example be used in reduction of amides, reduction of carbonyl compounds in the presence of cobalt(II) chloride as catalyst, Cu-catalyzed reductive hydroxymethylation of styrenes, and Rh-catalyzed hydrodediazoniation.

== Applications ==
Compounds based on triethoxysilane might be used in fluoride varnish.
