= Silane quats =

Class of antimicrobials developed by Dow Corning in the 1970s

Silane-Quats are a class of antimicrobials developed by Dow Corning and first patented in the United States of America in February 1971 (U.S. Patent Number 3560385). Subsequent patents were filed in the 1970s by Dow Corning for utilizing its silane-quat as an effective antimicrobial. In doing so, Dow Corning had invented a durable, non-leaching, persistent, surface bonding antimicrobial effective against a wide range of unicellular microorganisms on a variety of surfaces.

There are at least four private companies in the United States that are the primary manufacturers of Silane-Quats, which are widely known by various names such as Quat-Silane, SiQuats, Si-Qacs, Organosilane and Sil-Quats. Synthesis is typically conducted in a methanol, however, there are water-synthesized formulations which range in stability depending on the dilution process and/or the presence of stabilizers and additives.

== Chemical composition ==
Current manufacturing methods produce concentrated Silane-Quats that range from 42% to 72% active ingredient by weight, with the remainder of the formulation being silanes, alkylamines and methanol. Its chemical formula is C_{26}H_{58}NO_{3}SiCl.

In manufactured concentrated state, Silane-Quat is referred to as:

3-(trimethoxysilyl) propyldimethyloctadecyl ammonium chloride

In a diluted or hydrolyzed state in formulation it is referred to as:

3-(trihydroxysilyl) propyldimethyloctadecyl ammonium chloride

The composition of Silane-Quat is a long chain molecule with three basic parts: a silane base for covalent bonding to surfaces, a centrally located positively charged nitrogen component and a long chain "spear" consisting of a methyl hydrocarbon group. This spear group performs the efficacy work of the molecule.

== Uses ==
=== Manufacturing ===
Several finished goods utilize manufacturing processes that deploy Silane-Quats into the composition of raw material. Things such as plastics, rubber and textiles are many times impregnated with Silane-Quat in order to give them antimicrobial properties. These antimicrobial properties help the finished goods in many ways. Primarily they aid in inhibiting the growth and colonization of microbes on the product. This in turn prevents material degradation, odors caused by bacterial growth and a decrease in the occurrences of infection caused by microbial contamination. When 'built into' the raw materials of a finished product, Silane-Quats are very effective and durable. Examples of this type of application are antimicrobial plastics used in things like medical equipment or personal item bins at airports. Many smaller items are manufactured using antimicrobial raw materials like paints, mousepads, bath towels, footwear and athletic clothing. In recent years, new product applications for silane-quat have also been developed. One example being antimicrobial adhesive tapes that cover touch points like door knobs, handrails or elevator buttons. These types of products make it quick and easy to protect high touch areas with a self sanitizing media. In recent years there have been several clinical research studies involving medical implants and other surgical items that have been manufactured using Silane-Quats in order to reduce the occurrence of post operative infection.

=== Preventative antimicrobial ===
Silane-Quats are widely applied to homes and public areas such as offices, hospitals and schools as a preventative antimicrobial. Utilizing foggers, electrostatic sprayers and trigger sprayers, Silane-Quats are applied to clean, dried and pre-sanitized surfaces and allowed to dry. Typically these solutions are anywhere from .50%-2.0% mixtures of water and Silane-Quat. Once sprayed and dried, the application renders a surface antimicrobial. There is debate on the longevity of these applications. It is widely noted that they are not permanent and must be re-applied periodically. The general scientific consensus is that a properly treated surface should remain antimicrobial for anywhere from 6–8 weeks with moderate touch/abrasion activity. Surfaces that do not see intense touch or abrasion traffic will typically retain their antimicrobial properties longer. The common industry consensus is that for low traffic areas re-application should be done approximately every 90 days.

=== Odor control agent ===
Odor control is a major problem that is efficiently addressed by Silane-Quats. This is accomplished by preventing the growth colonization of odor causing bacteria on a surface.

=== Disinfecting formulation component ===
There are disinfection products on the market that use Silane-Quats as a component of their formulations. When mixed with a compatible primary disinfecting agent to render an immediate wet kill, the formulation is left to dry on the surface and once dried, the Silane-Quat bonds to the surface and continues to work by providing a 'dry kill' for an extended period of time after initial use. These formulations are extremely effective, however they must be allowed to air dry completely after application so that the Silane-Quat can bond to the surface in order to continuously provide efficacy when dried. These disinfecting formulations differ from standard Quat-Silane formulations in that they provide a dual action of disinfection and antimicrobial protection in one single product.

== Method of efficacy ==
Unlike traditional sanitizers and disinfectants, Silane-Quats have a unique method of efficacy. With traditional chemicals, microorganisms are killed with a barrage of liquid that will do everything from disrupt the cell wall to simply dissolving them with a high pH or low pH. Silane-Quat differs in that it utilizes an electro-mechanical method in a dry state to neutralize microorganisms before they can colonize a surface. When applied to a surface, the Silane-Quat molecules covalently bond to the surface as the product dries. Utilizing the silane base as an anchor, the long chain molecule then 'stands up' like a needle on the treated surface. As a microbe comes in contact with the bonded Silane-Quat molecule, the carbon based spear which consists of the methyl hydrocarbon grouping pierces the membrane of the microorganism. Once in contact with the Silane-Quat molecule, the positively charged nitrogen molecule at the base slowly draws the microorganism down further onto the hydrocarbon spear group and electrically neutralizes it.

This method of efficacy is very effective and versatile however due to the constant presence of dead biofilm, surfaces must be adequately maintained in order to keep the hydrocarbon molecules exposed so that they can do their work. Periodic cleaning or wiping must be done in order to keep the treated surface ready to continually self sanitize.

== Durability ==
The associated maintenance involved in regularly taking care of a treated surface also serves to slowly remove small parts of the molecule from the surface over time through simple abrasion. In addition, there are several harsh disinfectants that can break down the molecules and remove them from the surface which will prompt re-application. The most common issue associated with durability is abrasion. The covalent bond is durable but not permanent. In numerous independent laboratory tests, Silane-Quat has survived in some cases up to a year depending on the method and frequency of abrasion. In other tests, efficacy could be reduced significantly over a few weeks by introducing more aggressive abrasion using special laboratory equipment designed to test the limits of failure such as the Gardco device. Many of these tests are also highly dependent on the concentration of Silane-Quat in the formulation, the synthesis method (water or methanol) and the method of application. It has been found that under laboratory conditions, Silane-Quat performs best if it is synthesized in methanol and applied using an electrostatic sprayer. In recent EPA testing conducted in coordination with Homeland Security Research, several Silane-Quat formulations were tested for efficacy and durability. The results concluded that approximately 80 abrasion passes combined with chemicals such as 2000ppm bleach was enough to cause the Silane-Quat coating to begin fail and fall below a 99.9% kill. In direct contrast, the unabraded samples were shown to have efficacy of up to 6 weeks against microorganisms like Phi6, a bacteriophage surrogate for Covid19, at a log kill of >99.9%. The general scientific consensus at this point is that it appears to be that if properly maintained and periodically cleaned and re-applied, Silane-Quat is an extremely effective self sanitizing agent, however in the presence of heavy abrasion and/or harsh chemicals, reapplication must be done more frequently in order to maintain integrity.

== Effectiveness, efficacy ==
Research has shown efficacy of Silane-Quats against a broad range of microbes.

Independent testing and other publicly available research literature sources disclose the following list and references of organisms that are deactivated by Silane-Quats:

- Anabaena cylindricia
- Chlorella
- Chlorophyta (green)
- Chrysophyta (brown)
- Oscillatoria borneti
- Pleurococcus
- Protococcus
- Scenedesmus quadricauda
- Selenastrum gracile
- Acinetobacter calcoaceticus
- Aeromonas hydrophilia
- Bacillus cereus
- Bacillus subtilis
- Bacillus typhimurium
- Citrobacter diversus
- Clostridium perfringens
- Corynebacterium bovis
- Corynebacterium diphtheriae
- Cutibacterium acnes
- Enterobacter aerogenes
- Enterobacter agglomerans
- Enterobacter cloacae
- Enterococcus
- Enterococcus faecalis
- Escherichia coli
- Klebsiella pneumoniae
- Klebsiella terrigena
- MHV-A59
- MS2 Virus
- Mycobacterium tuberculosis
- Phi6
- Proteus mirabilis
- Proteus vulgaris
- Pseudomonas aeruginosa
- Pseudomonas cepacia
- Salmonella enterica
- Salmonella typhi
- Salmonella typhimurium
- SARS-CoV-2
- Serratia liquefaciens
- Serratia marcescens
- Stachybotrys chartarum
- Staphylococcus aureus
- Staphylococcus epidermidis
- Streptococcus faecaliis
- Streptococcus pyogenes
- Vancomycin-resistant enterococci
- Alternaria alternata
- Aspergillus flavus
- Aspergillus fumigatus
- Aspergillus Niger
- Bipolaris australiensis
- Candida albicans
- Candida parapsilosis
- Cephaldascus fragans
- Cladosporium herbarum
- Clonostachys rosea
- Cryptococcus humicola
- Epidermophyton floccosum
- Fusarium nigrum
- Fusarium solani
- Geotrichum candidum
- Gliocladium roseum
- Gliomastix cerealis
- lternaris species
- Mariannaea elegans
- Microsporum audouinii
- Monilia grisea
- Oospora lactis sp
- Oospora lactis
- Penicillium albicans
- Penicillium chrysogenum
- Penicillium citrinum
- Penicilliumn notatum
- Penicillium notatum
- Penicillium variabilei
- Stachybotrys atra
- Saccharomyces cerevisiae
- Trichoderma flavus
- Trichosporon mucoides
- Trichophyton interdigitale
- Trichophyton mentagrophytes
- Trichophyton mentagrophytes
