= Silylium ion =

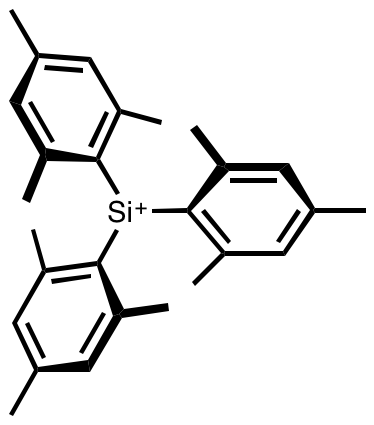
Chemical structure of Si(mesityl)^{+}_{3}.

A silylium ion is a reactive silyl-containing cation with the formula SiR^{+}_{3}. With three rather than the usual four bonds to Si, silylium ions are the silicon analogues of carbenium ions. They can be viewed as protonated silylenes. Early efforts to generate these cations produced salts of the pyridine complex [(CH_{3})_{3}Si-NC_{5}H_{5}]^{+}, the hydride-bridged species [(Et_{3}Si)_{2}H]^{+}, and the toluene complex [(mes)_{3}Si(toluene)]^{+}.

Well-characterized silylium salts with well-defined three-coordinate silicon cations trimesitylsilylium Si(C_{6}H_{2}Me_{3})^{+}_{3} and tris(pentamethylphenyl) Si(C_{6}Me_{5})^{+}_{3}. These cations are related to trityl (C(C_{6}H_{5})^{+}_{3}), with the extra methyl groups providing steric protection, compensating for the greater size of Si vs C. Its ^{29}Si NMR chemical shift is 225.5 ppm, downfield of TMS, which indicates that the cation is quite "naked". Trimethylsilyl trifluoromethanesulfonate (Me_{3}SiOTf), normally considered a source of electrophilic silicon, has a ^{29}Si NMR shift of 43 ppm.

Salts of Si(C_{6}H_{2}Me_{3})^{+}_{3} and Si(C_{6}Me_{5})^{+}_{3} have been crystallized with the carborane [HCB_{11}Me_{5}Br_{6}]^{−} and decaborate [B_{12}Cl_{12}]^{2-}, respectively. Weakly coordinating anions are essential for the isolation of these highly electrophilic cations.

== See also ==
- Silanide
