= Silanide =

Anionic molecule derived from silane

Names
- Other names Trihydridosilanide; Trihydridosilicate(1-); Trihydridosilicate(IV)

Identifiers
CAS Number	15807-96-2
3D model (JSmol)	Interactive image
ChEBI	CHEBI:30561
ChemSpider	19684660
Gmelin Reference	266
PubChem CID	166628
CompTox Dashboard (EPA)	DTXSID801317131
- InChI: InChI=1S/H3Si/h1H3/q-1 Key: LNVJLOIIRUIQCP-UHFFFAOYSA-N
- SMILES: [SiH3-]

Properties
Chemical formula	SiH^{−}_{3}
Molar mass	31.109 g·mol^{−1}

Related compounds
Related compounds	Methyl anion, Germyl, Stannyl, Phosphinide, Arsinide
- Except where otherwise noted, data are given for materials in their standard state (at 25 °C [77 °F], 100 kPa). Infobox references

A silanide is a chemical compound containing an anionic silicon(IV) centre, the parent ion being SiH^{−}_{3}. The hydrogen atoms can also be substituted to produce more complex derivative anions such as tris(trimethylsilyl)silanide (hypersilyl), tris(tert-butyl)silanide, tris(pentafluoroethyl)silanide, or triphenylsilanide. The simple silanide ion can also be called trihydridosilanide or silyl hydride.

== Formation ==
The simplest trihydridosilanides can be produced from a triphenylsilanide in a reaction with hydrogen or PhSiH_{3} at standard conditions. The triphenylsilanide can be made in a reaction of Ph_{3}SiSiMe_{3} with the metal tert-butoxy compound.

Reacting hydrogen with potassium triphenylsilyl K(Me_{6}TREN)SiPh_{3} can yield potassium silanide.

Other method to form silanides are to heat a heavy metal silicide with hydrogen, or react the dissolved metal with silane.

Atomic metals can react directly with silane to yield unstable molecules with HMSiH_{3} formulae. These can be condensed into a noble gas matrix. With titanium this also yields molecules with hydrogen bridging between silicon and titanium.

== Properties ==
The silanide ion has an effective ionic radius of 2.26 Å. In salts at room temperature the ion's orientation is not stable, and it rotates. But at lower temperatures (under 200K) silanide becomes fixed in orientation. The ordered structure forms the β- phase, whereas the higher temperature and more symmetrical disordered structure is called α- phase. The β- phase is about 15% more compact than the α-phase.

The silanide ion has C_{3v} symmetry. The silicon to hydrogen bond length is 1.52 Å and the H-Si-H bond angle is 92.2°, not far off a right angle. In a range of compounds, the stretching force constant for the Si-H bond is 1.9 to 2.05 N cm^{–1}, which is much softer than that of silane's 2.77 N cm^{–1}.

Silanide salts are very easily damaged by air or water.

Heating to under 414K results in the release of hydrogen and the formation of a Zintl-phase MSi. If an alkali silande is rapidly heated to 500K another irreversible reaction occurs:

46KSiH_{3} → K_{8}Si_{46} + 38KH + 50H_{2}.

== Use ==
Trihydridosilanides have been investigated as hydrogen storage materials. Potassium silanide can reversibly gain or lose hydrogen over several hours at 373K. However this does not work for sodium silanide. The rate of hydrogen exchange may be improved by a catalyst. Unwanted reactions may reduce the number of times this process can happen.

== List ==
name	formula	Crystal system	space group	unit cell	volume	density	comment	references
tetramethyl-1,4,7,10-tetraaminocyclododecane lithium silanide	Li(Me_{4}TACD)SiH_{3}						colourless; unstable	
trisilylamine	N(SiH_{3})_{3}						mp -105 °C; planar	
tetramethyl-1,4,7,10-tetraaminocyclododecane sodium silanide	Na(Me_{4}TACD)SiH_{3}	tetragonal	P4/n	a=9.77 c=9.45 Z=2	901	1.041	colourless	
	Na_{8}(OC_{2}H_{4}OC_{2}H_{4}OCH_{3})_{6}(SiH_{3})_{2}						H is bridge	
trisilylphosphine	P(SiH_{3})_{3}							
Potassium silanide	KSiH_{3}	cubic		a=7.23	377.9	1.241	pale yellow	
	β-KSiH_{3}	orthorhombic	Pnma	a = 8.800, b = 5.416, c = 6.823, Z = 4	325.2			
tetramethyl-1,4,7,10-tetraaminocyclododecane potassium silanide	K(Me_{4}TACD)SiH_{3}•2C_{6}H_{6}	tetragonal	P4_{2}/mnm	a=12.3401 c=14.9372 Z=2	2274.6	1.10	colourless	
	[K(18-crown-6)SiH_{3}·THF]							
	[K(18-crown-6)SiH_{3}·HSiPh_{3}]						H is bridge	
	Cp_{2}(Me_{3}P)TiSiH_{3}						purple	
	[(C_{5}H_{5})_{2}TiSiH_{2}]_{2}	tetragonal	P4_{2}/mnm	a = 8.018, c = 16.113, Z = 2			olive green; Ti-SiH_{2}-Ti-SiH_{2}- ring	
	[Cp_{2}Ti(μ-HSiH_{2})]_{2}						dark blue	
	Cp_{2}Ti(μ-HSiH_{2})(μ-H)TiCp_{2}						dark yellowish green	
	HCrSiH_{3}							
	[Cp(OC)_{2}Fe]_{2}SiH_{2}	triclinic	P1̅	a=6.318 b=10.653 c=12.453 α=67.884 β=75.35 γ=72.79 Z=2	732.1	1.742	light yellow	
	[(μ_{2}-CO)Cp_{2}(OC)_{2}Fe_{2}]SiH_{2}						dark red	
	[(μ_{2}-CO)Cp_{2}(OC)_{2}Fe_{2}][Cp(OC)_{2}Fe]SiH						dark red	
	HNiSiH_{3}							
	HZnSiH_{3}							
	[(^{dtbp}Cbz)GeSiH_{3}]_{2}•C_{6}H_{18}	monoclinic	P2_{1}/n	a 16.144 b 15.0369 c 21.974 β 91.927°				
trisilylarsine	As(SiH_{3})_{3}							
rubidium silanide	RbSiH_{3}	cubic		a=7.52	425.3	1.824	yellow	
tetramethyl-1,4,7,10-tetraaminocyclododecane rubidium silanide	Rb(Me_{4}TACD)SiH_{3}•2C_{6}H_{6}	tetragonal	P4_{2}/mnm	a=12.3934 c=14.9632 Z=2	2298.3	1.223	yellow	
	K_{0.5}Rb_{0.5}SiH_{3}	cubic	P4̅3m	a=12.832	2112.7			
	Mo(CO)(H)(SiH_{3})(depe)_{2}							
	[Cp(OC)_{2}Ru]_{2}SiH_{2}						beige mp 25	
trisilylstibine	Sb(SiH_{3})_{3}							
caesium silanide	CsSiH_{3}	cubic		a=7.86	485.6	2.243	yellow	
	Cs_{0.5}K_{0.5}SiH_{3}	cubic	P4̅3m	a=13.0965	2246.3			
	Cs_{0.5}Rb_{0.5}SiH_{3}	cubic	P4̅3m	a=13.2982	2351.7			
bis(di-tert-butylphenyl)di-tert-butylcanozalide	[(^{dtbp}Cbz)BaSiH_{3}]_{8}		P4/nnc	a=38.7375 c=44.8635				
	[Cp_{2}SmSiH_{3}]_{3}						orange	
	(C_{5}Me_{5})Sm(SiH_{3})(THF)(C_{5}Me_{5})K(THF)						dark red	
	(C_{5}Me_{5})Eu(SiH_{3})(THF)(C_{5}Me_{5})K(THF)	orthorhombic	Pna2_{1}	a=19.320 b=16.742 c=10.027 Z=4	3240.0	1.406	orange-red	
	(C_{5}Me_{5})Yb(SiH_{3})(THF)(C_{5}Me_{5})K(THF)	orthorhombic	Pna2_{1}	a=19.321 b=16.496 c=9.926 Z=4	3163.7		dark red	
	Cp(^{i}Pr_{3}P)Os(H)(Br)SiH_{3}						yellow	
	trans-(Cy_{3}P)_{2}HPtSiH_{3}							

== Related ==
Under high hydrogen pressure, pentacoordinated and hexacoordinated silicon hydride ions are stabilised including SiH^{−}_{5} and SiH^{2−}_{6}.

More complex derivatives include silanimine -NHSiH_{3},

With a double bond between silicon and the metal a silylene complex is formed. With a triple bond, M≡SiH forms with metals such as molybdenum and tungsten.

With less hydrogen, a polyanionic hydride ^{∞}_{1}[(SiH)^{−}] can be formed.

General organic compounds are termed silylium ions.
