= Silanization =

Attachment of an organosilyl group to some chemical species

Silanization is the attachment of an organosilyl group to some chemical species. Almost always, silanization is the conversion of a silanol-terminated surface to an alkylsiloxy-terminated surface. This conversion confers hydrophobicity to a previously hydrophilic surface. This process is often used to modify the surface properties of glass, silicon, alumina, quartz, and metal oxide substrates, which all have an abundance of hydroxyl groups. Silanization differs from silylation, which usually refers to attachment of organosilicon groups to molecular substrates.

== Mechanism ==
Silanization mechanisms vary with substrate and with silanization reagent. In the usual circumstance, surface MOH groups react as nucleophiles with silyl chlorides or silyl alkoxides. The stoichiometry for these reactions are shown:

M−OH + R_{3}SiCl → M−OSiR_{3} + HCl
M−OH + R_{3}SiOCH_{3} → M−OSiR_{3} + CH_{3}OH

M is typically Si, but could be many other elements.

The process is assumed to follow the pathways that apply to silylation of molecular substrates, such as alcohols.

== Properties of organofunctional alkoxysilanes ==
Structural formula of (3-aminopropyl)triethoxysilane (APTES)

Silanizing reagents often have the formula (RO)_{3-n}(CH_{3})_{n}SiR' or R'SiCl_{3}, where R = methyl or ethyl and R' is a long alkyl chain or a functionalized alkyl group.

Selected silanizing agents
Silane coupling agent	Structural formula	Comment
octadecyltrichlorosilane (ODTS)	CH_{3}(CH_{2})_{17}SiCl_{3}	long-chain alkyl
vinyltrimethoxysilane	CH_{2}=CHSi(OCH_{3})_{3}	vinyl-terminated
3-methacryloxypropyltrimethoxysilane	CH_{2}=C(CH_{3})CO_{2}(CH_{2})_{3}Si(OCH_{3})_{3}	acrylate terminated
3-aminopropyltriethoxysilane	H_{2}NCH_{2}CH_{2}CH_{2}Si(OC_{2}H_{5})_{3}	amino terminated; see also 3-aminopropyl)diethoxymethylsilane (APDMES), 3-aminopropyl)dimethylethoxysilane (APTMS), 3-aminopropyl)trimethoxysilane (CAS# 13822-56-5)
N-(2-amino ethyl)-3-aminopropyltrimethoxysilane	H_{2}NCH_{2}CH_{2}NH(CH_{2})_{3}Si(OCH_{3})_{3}	diamino-terminated
bis[3-triethoxysilyl-propyl]tetrasulfide	[(CH_{3}CH_{2}O)_{3}SiCH_{2}CH_{2}CH_{2}SS]_{2}	crosslinking group for silica-rubber composites
3-mercaptopropyltrimethoxysilane	HSCH_{2}CH_{2}CH_{2}Si(OCH_{3})_{3}	thiol-terrminated (see also MPDMS (3-mercaptopropyl)-methyl-dimethoxysilane
3-chloropropyltrimethoxysilane	CICH_{2}CH_{2}CH_{2}Si(OCH_{3})_{3}	chloroalkyl-terminated
3-glycidoxypropyl)-dimethylethoxysilane (GPMES)	CH_{2}OCHCH_{2}Si(CH_{3})_{2}(OC_{2}H_{5})	epoxide-containing

The nature of the organic group on the silanization agent strongly influences the properties of the surface. Simple alkyl-containing silanizing groups confer hydrophobicity.

When side chains of the silane compound are amines or thiols, the surfaces assume the properties of those functional groups. These surfaces are susceptible to further reactions characteristic of the appended functional groups. Grafting can be performed, for example.

== Applications ==
=== Reversed-phase chromatography ===
A popular stationary phase is an octadecyl carbon chain (C18)-bonded silica (USP classification L1). Such materials are produced by reaction of silica gel with trimethoxyoctadecylsilane. The individual links involve silanol groups displacing the methoxy groups, forming an Si-O-Si bonds. This reaction changes the hydrophilic silanol groups into hydrophobic coatings. Other silanizing groups install C8-bonded silica (L7), pure silica (L3), cyano-bonded silica (L10) and phenyl-bonded silica (L11). Note that C18, C8 and phenyl are dedicated reversed-phase resins, while cyano columns can be used in a reversed-phase mode depending on analyte and mobile phase conditions.

=== Glassware ===
Silanization (or siliconization) of glassware is a common application that increases the hydrophobicity of a glass container. Thus treated, the glassware produces a flat meniscus and allowing for more complete transfer of aqueous solutions.

Silanization of glassware is used in cell culturing to minimize adherence of cells to flask walls. Additionally, the silanization process is also used in biomedical fields for a wide variety of purposes, including anchoring DNA to substrates.

Silanization of glassware can be achieved by dipping into a solution of 5-10% dimethyldiethoxysilane followed by heating.

Silanization is also used for DNA chips. Nucleic acids do not bond to untreated glass surfaces. Silanization can be providing a better bonding site for the nucleic acids onto the chip. A common silane used to treat glass surfaces for this application is (3-mercaptopropyl)trimethoxysilane, which increases the number of reactive thiol groups on the surface The nucleic acids can bond to these available thiol groups on the surface of the glass DNA chip after silanization occurs.

=== Dental ===
Silanization is often used to treat ceramics used for dental restorations and repairs. Applying silane coupling agents after grit blasting the ceramic material has been shown to produce durable resin bonding. Additionally, for titanium and other metal implant features in wires and crowns, application of silane coupling agents followed by resin composite cement has produced durable bonding in a clinical application. While silane coupling agents are widely used in dental practices, they are subject to bond degradation due to the environment of the oral cavity, weakening the adhesion between the surfaces that they are used to connect.

== Additional reading ==
- Zelzer, M. (2015), "Peptide-based switchable and responsive surfaces", Switchable and Responsive Surfaces and Materials for Biomedical Applications, Elsevier, pp. 65–92, doi:10.1016/b978-0-85709-713-2.00003-1, ISBN 978-0-85709-713-2
- Schwartz, Jeffrey; Avaltroni, Michael J; Danahy, Michael P; Silverman, Brett M; Hanson, Eric L; Schwarzbauer, Jean E; Midwood, Kim S; Gawalt, Ellen S (2003). "Cell Attachment and Spreading on Metal Implant Materials". Materials Science and Engineering: C. 23 (3): 395–400. doi:10.1016/S0928-4931(02)00310-7.
