= Polymethylhydrosiloxane =

Organic polymer with the repeating formula [CH3(H)SiO]

Names
- Other names Methyl hydrogen siloxane; Poly(methyl siloxane); Poly(methylhydrosiloxane); Polysilicone 4

Identifiers
CAS Number	9004-73-3
Abbreviations	PMHS
ChemSpider	none
ECHA InfoCard	100.119.568
CompTox Dashboard (EPA)	DTXSID8047501

Properties
Chemical formula	[CH_{3}(H)SiO]_{n}
Molar mass	variable
Density	1.006 g/cm^{3}
- Except where otherwise noted, data are given for materials in their standard state (at 25 °C [77 °F], 100 kPa). verify (what is ?) Infobox references

Polymethylhydrosiloxane (PMHS) is a polymer with the general structure [−CH_{3}(H)Si−O−]. It is used in organic chemistry as a mild and stable reducing agent easily transferring hydrides to metal centers and a number of other reducible functional groups. A variety of related materials are available under the following CAS registry numbers 9004-73-3, 16066-09-4, 63148-57-2, 178873-19-3. These include the tetramer ((MeSiHO)_{4}), copolymers of dimethylsiloxane and methylhydrosiloxane, and trimethylsilyl terminated materials.

This material is prepared by the hydrolysis of monomethyldichlorosilane CAS#: 75-54-7:

n MeSiHCl_{2} + n H_{2}O → [MeSiHO]_{n} + 2n HCl

The related polymer polydimethylsiloxane (PDMS) is made similarly, but lacking Si−H bonds, it exhibits no reducing properties. Dimethyldichlorosilane CAS#: 75-78-5 is then used instead of monomethyldichlorosilane CAS#: 75-54-7.

Illustrative of its use, PMHS is used for in situ conversion of tributyltin oxide to tributyltin hydride:

2 MeSiH + (Bu_{3}Sn)_{2}O → Me_{2}Si_{2}O + 2 Bu_{3}SnH
