= Triethylsilane =

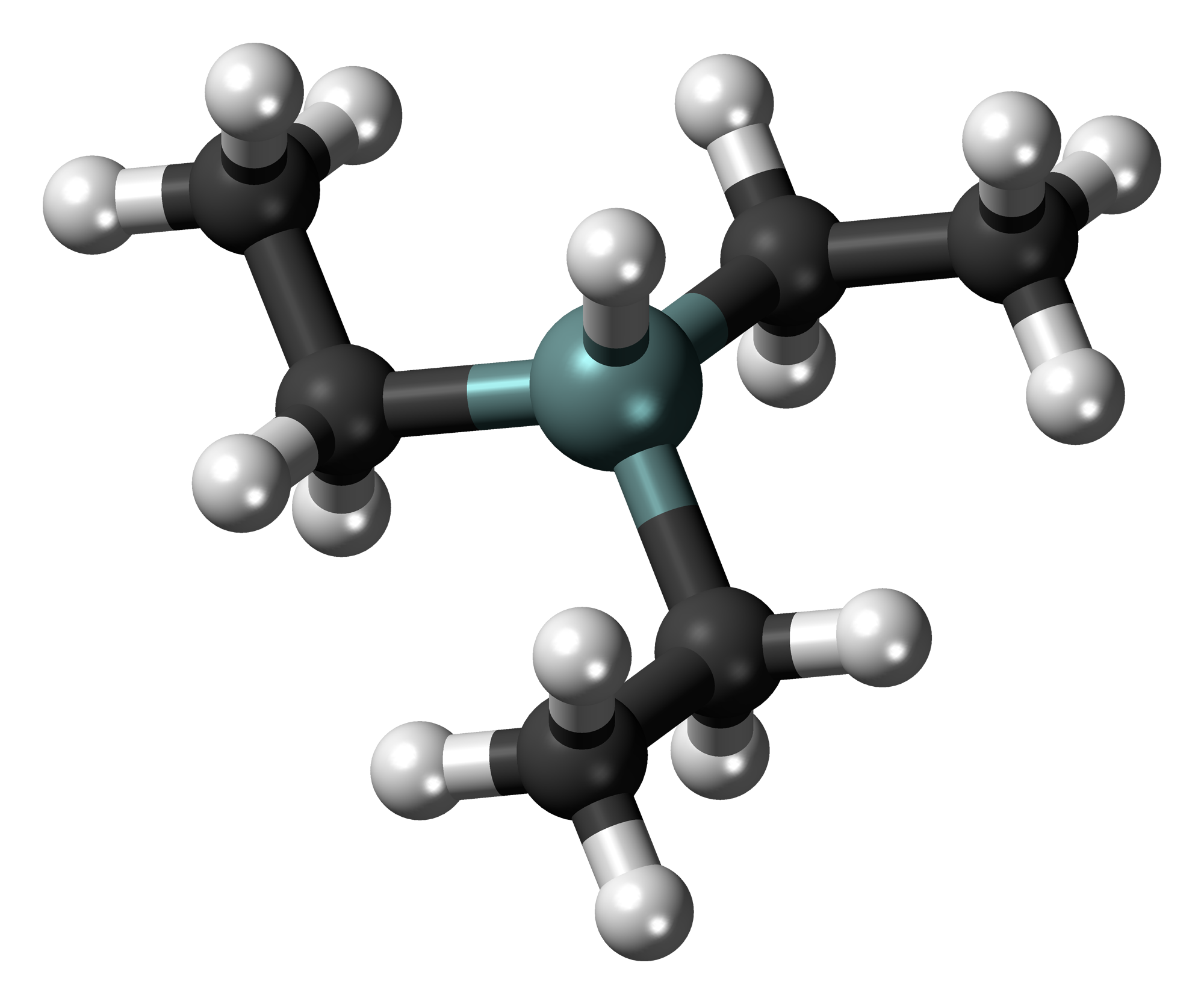

Names
- Preferred IUPAC name Triethylsilane

Identifiers
CAS Number	617-86-7
3D model (JSmol)	Interactive image
ChemSpider	11555
ECHA InfoCard	100.009.579
EC Number	210-535-3
PubChem CID	12052
UNII	0F9429873L
CompTox Dashboard (EPA)	DTXSID20870702
- InChI: InChI=1S/C6H16Si/c1-4-7(5-2)6-3/h7H,4-6H2,1-3H3 Key: AQRLNPVMDITEJU-UHFFFAOYSA-N
- SMILES: CC[SiH](CC)CC

Properties
Chemical formula	C_{6}H_{16}Si
Molar mass	116.28 g/mol
Appearance	colorless liquid
Density	0.728 g/mL
Melting point	−156.1 °C (−249.0 °F; 117.0 K)
Boiling point	107–108 °C (225–226 °F; 380–381 K)
log P	3.08
Vapor pressure	31 hPa at 20 °C; 75 hPa at 38 °C; 126 hPa at 50 °C

Hazards
- GHS labelling
Pictograms	(GHS02: Flammable)
Signal word	Danger
Hazard statements	H225, H412
Precautionary statements	P210, P273
Flash point	−2.99 °C (26.62 °F; 270.16 K) closed cup
- Except where otherwise noted, data are given for materials in their standard state (at 25 °C [77 °F], 100 kPa). verify (what is ?) Infobox references

Triethylsilane , also known as TES or triethylsilicon hydride, is the organosilicon compound with the formula (C_{2}H_{5})_{3}SiH. It is a trialkylsilane. The Si-H bond is reactive.

It was first discovered by Albert Ladenburg in 1872 among the products of reduction of tetraethyl orthosilicate with sodium and diethylzinc. He also prepared it by a stepwise reduction via ethoxytriethylsilane and named it silicoheptyl hydride, reflecting the idea of a silicon compound analogous to a seven-carbon hydrocarbon. This colorless liquid finds occasional use in organic synthesis. As one of the simplest trialkylsilanes that is a liquid at room temperature, triethylsilane is often used in studies of hydrosilylation catalysis.

== Organic chemistry ==
Triethylsilane is an occasional reagent in organic synthesis. In combination with indium compounds, it reduces esters to ethers. The reaction is typically performed in chloroform at 60 °C, using 0.05 equivalents of InBr_{3} catalyst. This system can also accommodate other carbonyl compounds like tertiary amides and carboxylic acids.

== Additional reading ==
- Richard T. Beresis, Jason S. Solomon, Michael G. Yang, Nareshkumar F. Jain, and James S. Panek (1998). "Synthesis of Chiral (E)-Crotylsilanes: [3R- AND 3S-]-(4E)-Methyl 3-(Dimethylphenylsilyl)-4-Hexenoate ". Organic Syntheses. 75: 78.
- Alessandro Dondoni and Daniela Perrone (2000). "Diastereoselective Synthesis of Protected Vicinal Amino Alcohols: (S)-2-[(4S)-N-tert-Butoxycarbonyl-2,2-Dimethyl-1,3,-oxazolidinyl]-2-tert-butyldimethylsiloxyethanal from a Serine-Derived Aldehyde ". Organic Syntheses. 77: 78.
- Pape C. (1881). "Über Siliziumpropylverbindungen". Ber. 14: 1873.
- Charles A. Kraus & Walter K. Nelson (1934). "The Chemistry of the Triethylsilicyl Group". J. Am. Chem. Soc. 56 (1): 195–202. Bibcode:1934JAChS..56..195K. doi:10.1021/ja01316a062.
