= Hydrosilylation =

Addition of Si-H bonds across unsaturated bonds

Hydrosilylation, also called catalytic hydrosilation, describes the addition of Si-H bonds across unsaturated bonds. Ordinarily the reaction is conducted catalytically and usually the substrates are unsaturated organic compounds. Alkenes and alkynes give alkyl and vinyl silanes; aldehydes and ketones give silyl ethers, while esters provide alkyl silyl mixed acetals. Hydrosilylation has been called the "most important application of platinum in homogeneous catalysis."

== Scope and mechanism ==
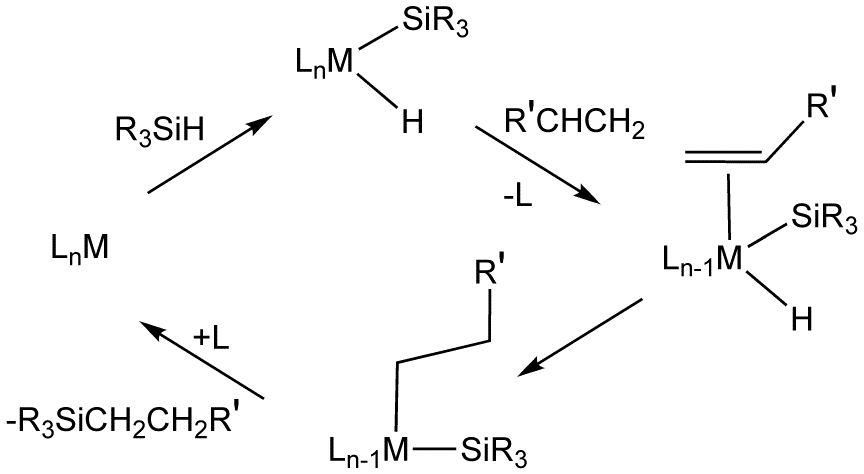
Idealized mechanism for metal-catalysed hydrosilylation of an alkene.

Hydrosilylation of alkenes represents a commercially important method for preparing organosilicon compounds. The process is mechanistically similar to the hydrogenation of alkenes. In fact, similar catalysts are sometimes employed for the two catalytic processes.

The prevalent mechanism, called the Chalk-Harrod mechanism, assumes an intermediate metal complex that contains a hydride, a silyl ligand (R_{3}Si), and the alkene substrate. Oxidative addition proceeds by the intermediacy of a sigma-complex, wherein the Si-H bond is not fully broken. Variations of the Chalk-Harrod mechanism exist. Some cases involve insertion of alkene into M-Si bond followed by reductive elimination, the opposite of the sequence in the Chalk-Harrod mechanism. In certain cases, hydrosilylation results in vinyl or allylic silanes resulting from beta-hydride elimination.

Hydrosilylation of alkenes usually proceeds via anti-Markovnikov addition, i.e., silicon is placed at the terminal carbon when hydrosilylating a terminal alkene; however, in the recent years, Markovnikov addition has become a growing field of research.

Alkynes also undergo hydrosilylation, e.g., the addition of triethylsilane to diphenylacetylene:

Et_{3}SiH + PhC≡CPh → Et_{3}Si(Ph)C=CH(Ph)

== Asymmetric hydrosilylation ==
Using chiral phosphines as spectator ligands, catalysts have been developed for catalytic asymmetric hydrosilation. A well studied reaction is the addition of trichlorosilane to styrene to give 1-phenyl-1-(trichlorosilyl)ethane:

Cl_{3}SiH + PhCH=CH_{2} → (Ph)(CH_{3})CHSiCl_{3}

Nearly perfect enantioselectivities (ee's) can be achieved using palladium catalysts supported by binaphthyl-substituted monophosphine ligands.

== Surface hydrosilylation ==
Silicon wafers can be etched in hydrofluoric acid (HF) to remove the native oxide and form a hydrogen-terminated silicon surface. The hydrogen-terminated surfaces undergo hydrosilation with unsaturated compounds (such as terminal alkenes and alkynes), to form a stable monolayer on the surface. For example:

Si-H + H_{2}C=CH(CH_{2})_{7}CH_{3} → Si-CH_{2}CHH-(CH_{2})_{7}CH_{3}

The hydrosilylation reaction can be initiated with UV light at room temperature or with heat (typical reaction temperature 120-200 °C), under moisture- and oxygen-free conditions. The resulting monolayer, which is stable and inert, inhibits oxidation of the base silicon layer, relevant to various device applications.

== Catalysts ==
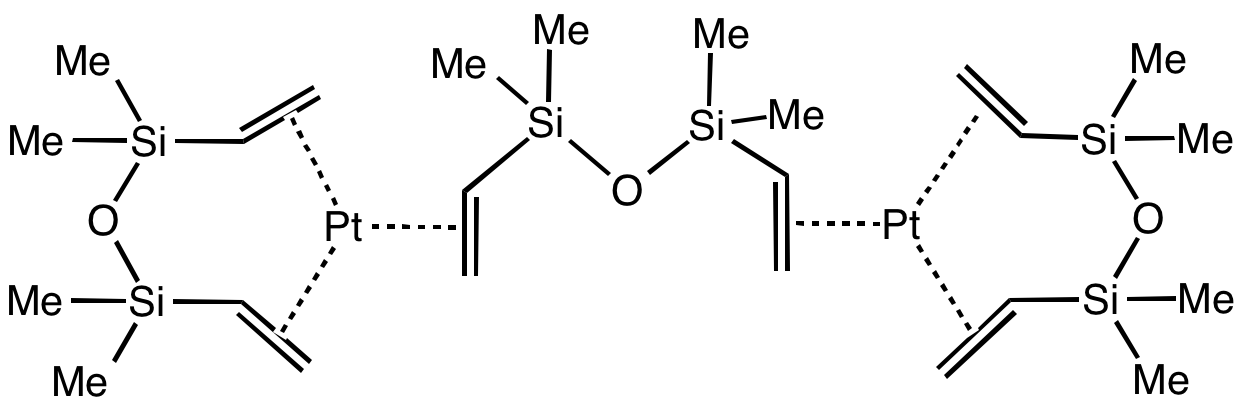
Kartstedt's catalyst is often used in hydrosilylation.

Before introduction of platinum catalysts by Speier, hydrosilylation was not practiced widely. A peroxide-catalyzed process was reported in academic literature in 1947, but the introduction of Speier's catalyst (H_{2}PtCl_{6}) was a big breakthrough.

Karstedt's catalyst was later introduced. It is a lipophilic complex that is soluble in the organic substrates of industrial interest. Complexes and compounds that catalyze hydrogenation are often effective catalysts for hydrosilylation, e.g. Wilkinson's catalyst.
