= Thiol-yne reaction =

Chemical addition of an –SH and –C≡CH molecule

In organic chemistry, the thiol-yne reaction (also known as alkyne hydrothiolation) is an organic reaction between a thiol (−SH) and an alkyne (−C≡CH). The reaction product is an alkenyl sulfide (−CH=CH−S−).

The reaction was first reported in 1949 with thioacetic acid as reagent and rediscovered in 2009. It is used in click chemistry and in polymerization, especially with dendrimers.

Thiol-yne reaction

Thiol-yne reaction

This addition reaction is typically facilitated by a radical initiator or UV irradiation and proceeds through a sulfanyl radical species. With monoaddition a mixture of (E/Z)-alkenes form. The mode of addition is anti-Markovnikov. The radical intermediate can engage in secondary reactions such as cyclisation. With diaddition the 1,2-disulfide or the 1,1- dithioacetal forms. Reported catalysts for radical additions are triethylborane, indium(III) bromide and AIBN. The reaction is also reported to be catalysed by cationic rhodium and iridium complexes, by thorium and uranium complexes, by rhodium complexes, by caesium carbonate and by gold.

Ichinose et al. thiol-yne reaction 1987

Ichinose et al. thiol-yne reaction 1987

Diphenyl disulfide reacts with alkynes to a 1,2-bis(phenylthio)ethylene. Reported alkynes are ynamides. A photoredox thiol-yne reaction has been reported.

== Polymer chemistry ==
In polymer chemistry, systems have been described based on addition polymerization with 1,4-benzenedithiol and 1,4-diethynylbenzene, in the synthesis of other addition polymer systems in the synthesis of dendrimers, in star polymers, in graft polymerization, block copolymers, and in polymer networks. Another reported application is the synthesis of macrocycles via dithiol coupling.

== See also ==
- Click chemistry
- Michael addition
- Radical addition
- Thiol-ene reaction
