= Thiol-ene reaction =

Formation of a thioether (–S–) compound from a thiol (–SH) and an alkene ( >C=C< )

In organosulfur chemistry, the thiol-ene reaction (also alkene hydrothiolation) is an organic reaction between a thiol (R−SH) and an alkene (R_{2}C=CR_{2}) to form a thioether (R−S−R'). This reaction was first reported in 1905, but it gained prominence in the late 1990s and early 2000s for its feasibility and wide range of applications. This reaction is accepted as a click chemistry reaction given the reactions' high yield, stereoselectivity, high rate, and thermodynamic driving force.

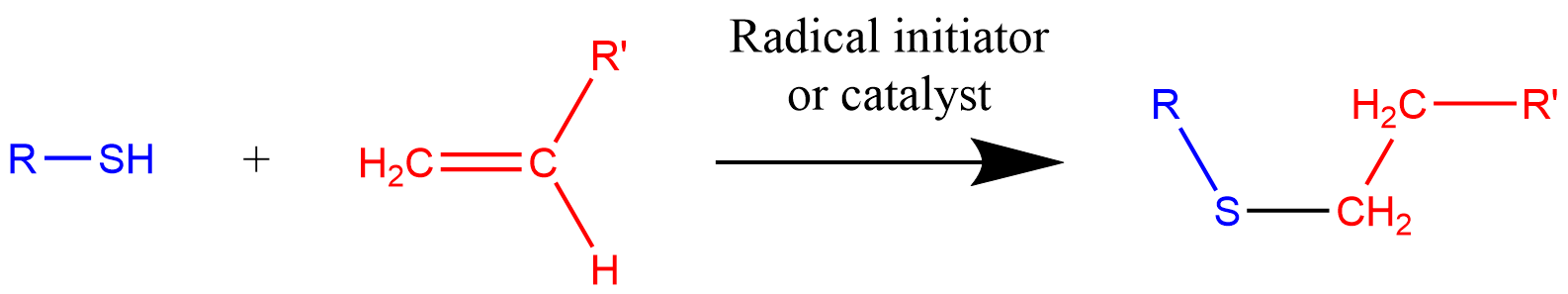
Basic schematic of thiol-ene addition reaction

The reaction results in an anti-Markovnikov addition of a thiol compound to an alkene. Given the stereoselectivity, high rate and yields, this synthetically useful reaction may underpin future applications in material and biomedical sciences.

== Mechanisms ==
=== Radical addition ===
Thiol-ene additions are known to proceed through two mechanisms: free-radical additions and catalyzed Michael additions. Free-radical additions can be initiated by light, heat or radical initiators, which form a thiyl radical species. The radical then propagates with an ene functional group via an anti-Markovnikov addition to form a carbon-centered radical. A chain-transfer step removes a hydrogen radical from a thiol, which can subsequently participate in multiple propagation steps.

Thiol-ene radical additions are advantageous for chemical synthesis because the step growth (propagation and chain-transfer steps) and chain growth (homopolymerization) processes can be effectively used to form homogeneous polymer networks. Photopolymerization is a useful radical-based reaction for applications within the nanotechnology, biomaterial, and material sciences, but these reactions are hindered by the inhibitory capabilities of oxygen. The thiol-ene radical addition combines the benefits of photopolymerization reactions with the aforementioned advantages of click chemistry reactions. This reaction is useful to the field of radical-based photopolymerization because it quantitatively and rapidly proceeds through a simple mechanism under ambient atmospheric conditions. The carbon-centered radical can undergo chain-growth polymerization depending on the thiol and ene functional groups. This free-radical polymerization can be useful in the synthesis of uniform polymer networks.

=== Michael addition ===
Thiol-ene reactions are known to proceed through a Michael addition pathway. These reactions are catalyzed by either a base or a nucleophile, resulting in a similar anti-Markovnikov addition product as the thiol-ene radical addition.

== Kinetics ==
Click chemistry reactions are known to be high efficiency and have fast reaction rates, yet there is considerable variability in the overall reaction rate depending on the functionality of the alkene. To better understand the kinetics of thiol-ene reactions, calculations and experiments of transition-state and reaction enthalpies were conducted for a number of alkenes and their radical intermediates. It was shown that the reactivity and structure of the alkene determines whether the reaction will follow a step-growth or chain-growth pathway. It was also shown that the thiol-ene polymerization can be tuned by enhancing intermolecular interactions between the thiol and alkene functional groups. A currently accepted trend is that electron-rich alkenes (such as vinyl ether or allyl ether) and norbornene are highly reactive compared to conjugated and electron-poor alkenes (butadiene and methoxyethene). In the case of norbornene and vinyl ether only step-growth is observed, no homopolymerization occurs after the formation of the carbon centered radical.

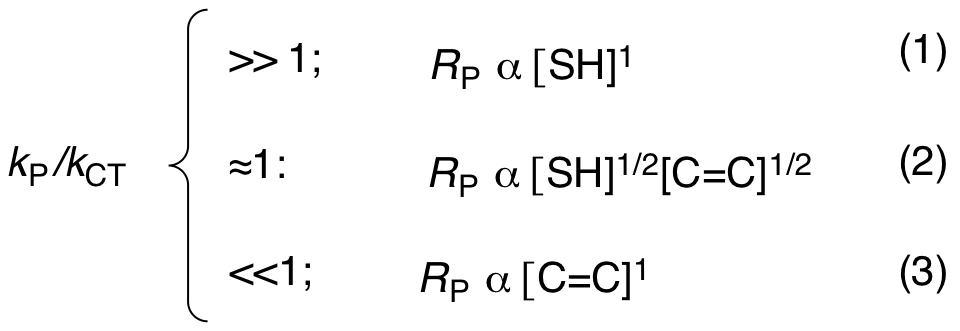
Thiol-ene radical addition reaction rate relationship

Due to the complex kinetics of this two-step cyclic reaction, the rate-determining step was difficult to delineate. Given that the rates of both steps must be equal, the concentration of the radical species is determined by the rate constant of the slower of the reaction steps. Thus the overall reaction rate (R_{P}) can be modeled by the ratio of the propagation rate (k_{P}) to the chain-transfer rate (k_{CT}).The behavior of the reaction rate is outlined by the relationship below. In all cases the reaction is first order, when k_{P} ≫ k_{CT} [Eq. 1] the reaction rate is determined by the thiol concentration and the rate limiting step is chain-transfer, when k_{P} ≪ k_{CT} [Eq. 2] the reaction rate is determined by the alkene concentration and the rate limiting step is the propagation, and finally when k_{P} ≈ k_{CT} [Eq. 3] the reaction is half order with respect to both the alkene and thiol concentrations.

The functional groups on the thiol and alkene compounds can affect the reactivity of the radical species and their respective rate constants. The structure of the alkene determines whether the reaction will be propagation or chain-transfer limited, and therefore first order with respect to alkene or thiol concentration respectively. In the case of reactive alkenes, such as allyl ether, chain-transfer is the rate-limiting step, while in the case of less reactive alkenes, such as vinyl silazanes, propagation is the rate-limiting step. The thiol's hydrogen affinity also affects the rate-limiting step. Alkyl thiols have less abstractable protons and therefore the chain-transfer step has a lower reaction rate than the propagation step.

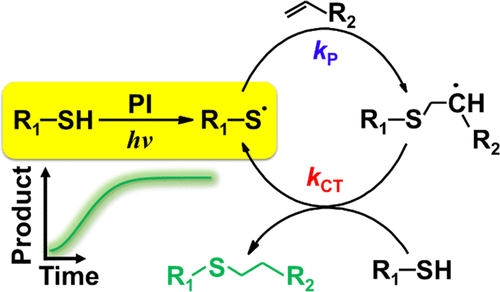
Scheme of photoinitiated thiol-ene click reaction.

Most time the quasi-first-order reaction yields a kinetic rate equation following the exponential decay function for the reactants and products.

[normalized thiol-ene product] = $1-e^{-kt}$

where k is an effective rate constant and t is time.

However, when the radical generation becomes the rate-limiting step, an induction period is often observed at the early stage of the reaction, for example, for photoinitiated reaction under weak light condition. The kinetic curve deviates from the exponential decay function for a common first-order reaction by having a slow growth period. The kinetic model has to include the radical generation step to explain this induction period (right figure). The final expression has a Gaussian-like shape.

[normalized thiol-ene product] = $1-e^{-\frac12 kt^2}$

where k is an effective rate constant and t is time.

== Synthetically useful thiol-ene reactions ==
=== Initiation of cascade cyclization ===
The thiol-ene reaction (and analogous thiol-yne reaction) have extensively been used in generating reactive intermediates for the cyclization of unsaturated substrates. Radical hydrothiolation of an unsaturated functional group indirectly generates a carbon-centered radical, which can then cyclize intramolecularly onto alkenes, oxime ethers, isocyanides, cyano groups, and aromatic rings. The use of thiyl radicals as initiators of cyclization has been employed in the synthesis of a number of natural products, including aplysins, α-kainic acid, asperparalines, and alkaloids such as narciclasine and lycoricidine.

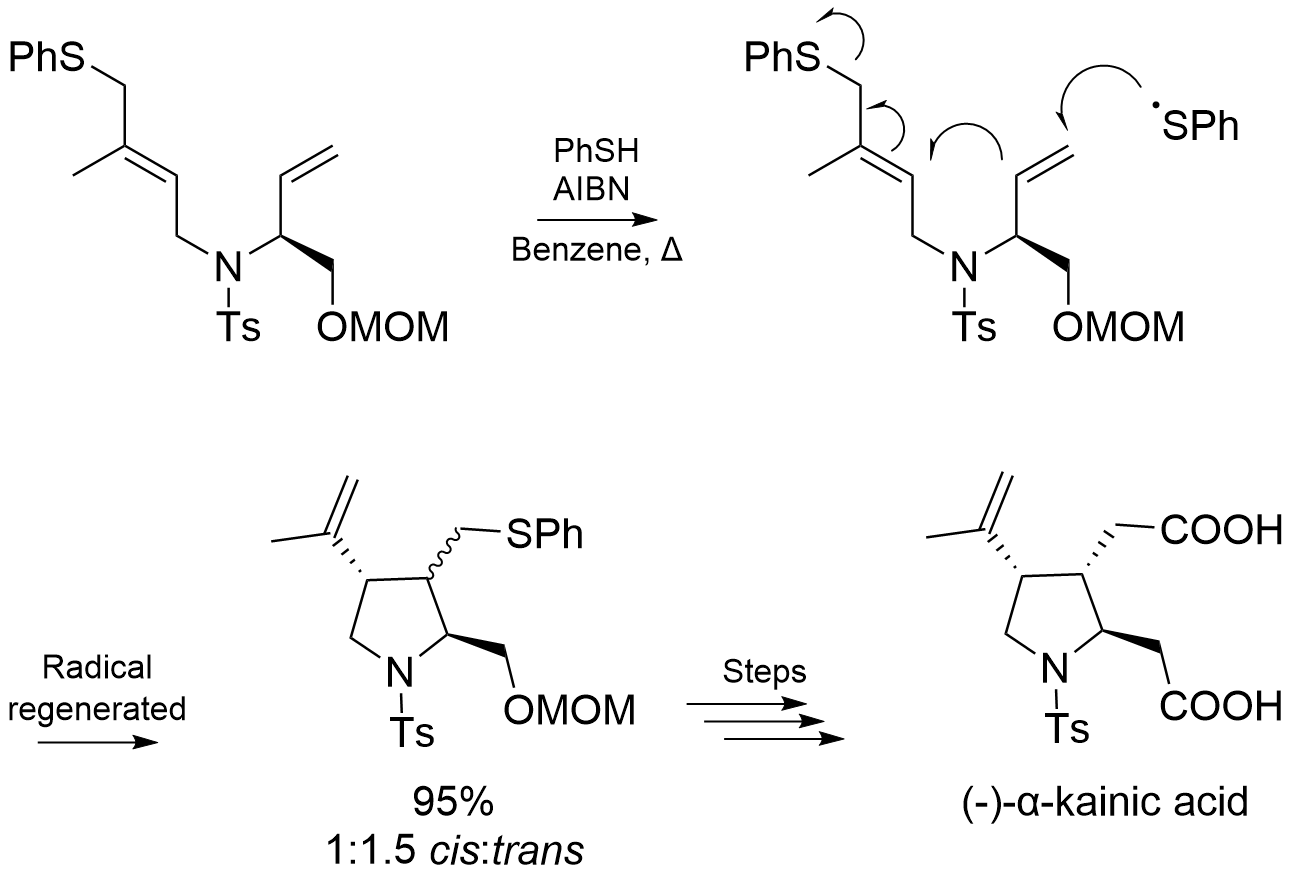
The synthesis of kainic acid via thiyl radical-induced cyclization.

=== Intramolecular thiol-ene reactions ===
Intramolecular thiol-ene reactions provide a means to create sulphur-containing heterocycles. The radical-initiated thiol-ene reaction has enabled the synthesis of four- to eight-membered rings, as well as macrocycles. While the radical thiol-ene reaction favors the anti-Markovnikov product, the regiochemistry of the cycloaddition depends on substituent effects and reaction conditions, which serve to direct the cyclization towards the thermodynamically or kinetically favored product respectively. This section examines intramolecular thiol-ene cyclization reactions, which yields a mixture of 5-exo and 6-endo products in order to facilitate a discussion of the factors, which may affect the regioselectivity of the intramolecular addition. This reaction has relevance for the synthesis of C-linked thiosugars. Both the furanose and pyranose thiosugars can be prepared from the same thiyl radical precursor; 5-exo and 6-endo cyclizations of this precursor form the respective desired compound. The conditions under which these cyclization reactions occur follow Baldwin's rules for ring closure.

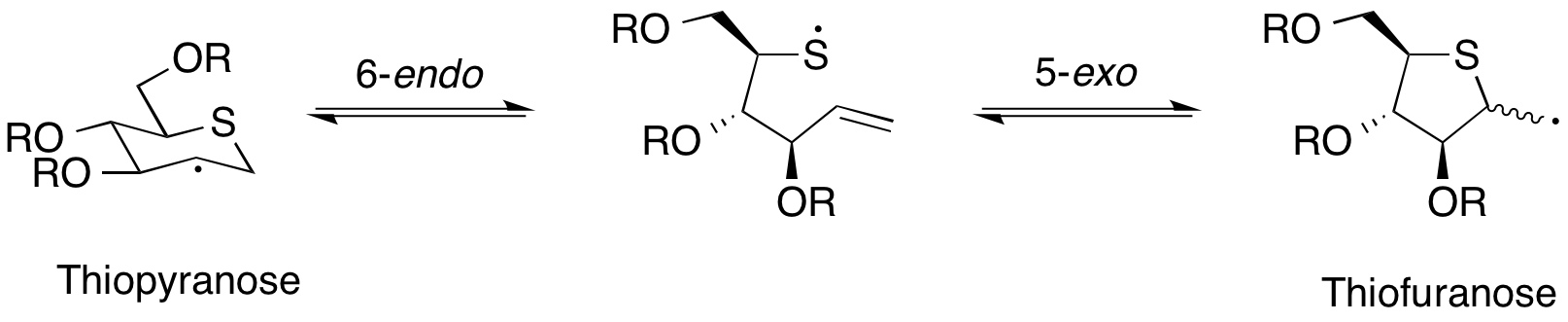
Thiosugar 5-exo and 6-endo cyclization

Intramolecular cyclization of thiyl and acyl thiyl radicals has been used to access alicyclic and heteorcyclic compounds, via anti-Markovnikov thiol-ene reactions on 1,6-dienes, under photochemical conditions.

=== Cis–trans conversion of alkenes ===
Given the reversibility of the thiol-ene radical addition, the reaction can be used to facilitate cis–trans isomerizations. The thiyl radical propagates with the alkene to form a carbon-centered radical, the previous double bond now allows free rotation around the single sigma bond. When the reverse reaction occurs, the orientation of the hydrogen addition on the carbon radical determines whether the isomerization product will be cis or trans. Therefore, composition of the products depends on the conformational stability of the carbon-centered radical intermediate.

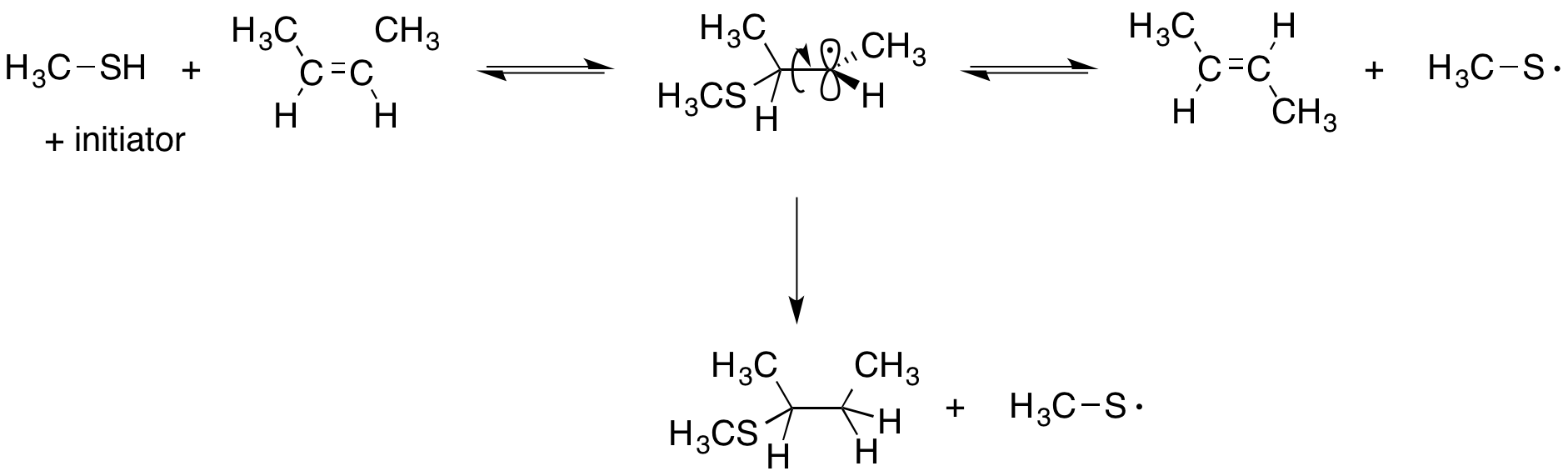
Thiol-ene cis–trans isomerization

== Potential applications ==
=== Dendrimer synthesis ===
Dendrimers are promising in medicine, biomaterials, and nanoengineering. These polymers can functions as targeting components, detecting agents, and pharmaceutically-active compounds. Thiol-ene additions are useful in the divergent synthesis of dendrimers due to the characteristics of click chemistry such as the mild reaction conditions (benign solvents), regioselectivity, high efficiency, high conversion and quantitative yield. Because this reaction is photo-initiated, it does not require copper catalysis, unlike other common reactions used in dendrimer preparation; this is advantageous for the synthesis of functional biomaterials given the inhibitory characteristic of copper on biological systems. Thiol-ene reactions have been used alongside anhydride, esterification, Grignard, and Michael reactions to functionalize chain ends and build polymer backbones in the synthesis of branched molecules such as glycodendrons, polythioether dendrimers and organosilicon thioether dendrimers.

A general strategy for the divergent synthesis of a dendrimer begins with a core; commonly used cores include 2,4,6-triallyloxy-1,3,5-triazine, triallyl isocyanurate and tetravinylsilane. In a well cited report, 2,4,6-triallyloxy-1,3,5-triazine was mixed with 1-thioglycerol in the absence of solvent, the thiol-ene reaction was initiated by the radical initiator 2,2-dimethoxy-2-phenylacetophenone and UV irradiation. Terminal alkene functional groups were added to the dendrimer via esterification by pent-4-enoic anhydride in the presence of DMAP and pyridine. The fourth generation product prepared in a stepwise fashion contains 48 terminal hydroxyl groups

=== Polymer synthesis ===
Multifunctional thiols such as pentaerythritol tetrakis(3-mercaptopropionate) can react with multifunctional enes such as norbornene-functionalized monomers, by photopolymerization to form cross-linked polymer networks. These thiol-ene networks are advantageous over traditional networks in that they form rapidly and quantitatively under atmospheric conditions (no oxygen inhibition) to form homogeneous polymer networks.

=== Surface patterning ===
The thiol-ene functionalization of surface has been widely investigated in material science and biotechnology. The attachment of a molecule with a sterically accessible alkene or thiol group to a solid surface enables the construction of polymers on the surface through subsequent thiol-ene reactions. Given that in aqueous solutions thiol-ene reactions can be initiated by UV light (wavelength 365–405 nm) or sunlight, the attachment of a given functional group to the exposed thiol or alkene can be controlled spatially through photomasking. More specifically, a photomask, enables the selective exposure of a surface to a UV light source, controlling the location of a given thiol-ene reaction, whereas the identity of the attached molecule is determined by the composition of the aqueous phase placed above the surface at the time of UV exposure. Thus, the manipulation of the shape of the photomask and the composition of the aqueous layer results in the creation of heterogeneous surface, whose properties depend on identity of the attached molecule at a given location.

Thiol-ene functionalization of a surface can be achieved with a high level of spatial specificity, allowing the production of photomasks.

Organo-triethoxysilane molecules, either thiol or vinyl tailed, have been introduced in surface functionalization. Ethoxysilane and methoxysilane functional groups are commonly used to anchor organic molecules on a variety of oxides surfaces. The thiol-ene coupling can be achieved either in the bulk solution before molecular anchoring or step-wise onto a substrate that enables photolithography. The reaction can be done in five minutes under sunlight that has ~4% UV light that is useful for the thiol-ene reaction.

=== Protein patterning on electron beam resist ===
Thiol-ene can also be used as an electron beam resist, resulting in nanostructures that allow direct protein functionalization.

== See also ==
- Click chemistry
- Free-radical addition
- Off-stoichiometry thiol-ene polymer
- Thiol-yne reaction
