= Kharasch addition =

chemical reactions for the Kharasch addition reaction of chloroform to a terminal alkene.

The Kharasch addition is an organic reaction and a metal-catalysed free radical addition of CXCl_{3} compounds (X = Cl, Br, H) to alkenes. The reaction is used to append trichloromethyl or dichloromethyl groups to terminal alkenes. The method has attracted considerable interest, but it is of limited value because of narrow substrate scope and demanding conditions.

The reaction mechanism involves free radicals of the general formula CXCl_{2} (X = Cl, H). For the precursors carbon tetrachloride and chloroform, the requisite radicals can arise by abstraction of a halogen atom by a electropositive metal. The addition proceeds in an anti-Markovnikov fashion. Early work linked the addition to olefin polymerization. This addition is a step in a protocol known as atom transfer radical polymerization.

An example of Kharasch addition is the synthesis of 1,1,3-trichloro-n-nonane from 1-octene and chloroform using an iron-based catalyst:

CH_{3}(CH_{2})_{5}CH=CH_{2} + HCCl_{3} → CH_{3}(CH_{2})_{5}CH(Cl)−CH_{2}CHCl_{2}

== History ==
The reaction was discovered by Morris S. Kharasch in the 1940s.
