= Syn and anti addition =

Terms for the placement of chemical substituents relative to a double or triple bond

In organic chemistry, syn- and anti-addition are different ways in which substituent molecules can be added to an alkene (R_{2}C=CR_{2}) or alkyne (RC≡CR). The concepts of syn and anti addition are used to characterize the different reactions of organic chemistry by reflecting the stereochemistry of the products in a reaction.

The type of addition that occurs depends on multiple different factors of a reaction, and is defined by the final orientation of the substituents on the parent molecule. Syn and anti addition are related to Markovnikov's rule for the orientation of a reaction, which refers to the bonding preference of different substituents for different carbons on an alkene or alkyne. In order for a reaction to follow Markovnikov's rule, the intermediate carbocation of the mechanism of a reaction must be on the more-substituted carbon, allowing the substituent to bond to the more-stable carbocation and the more-substituted carbon.

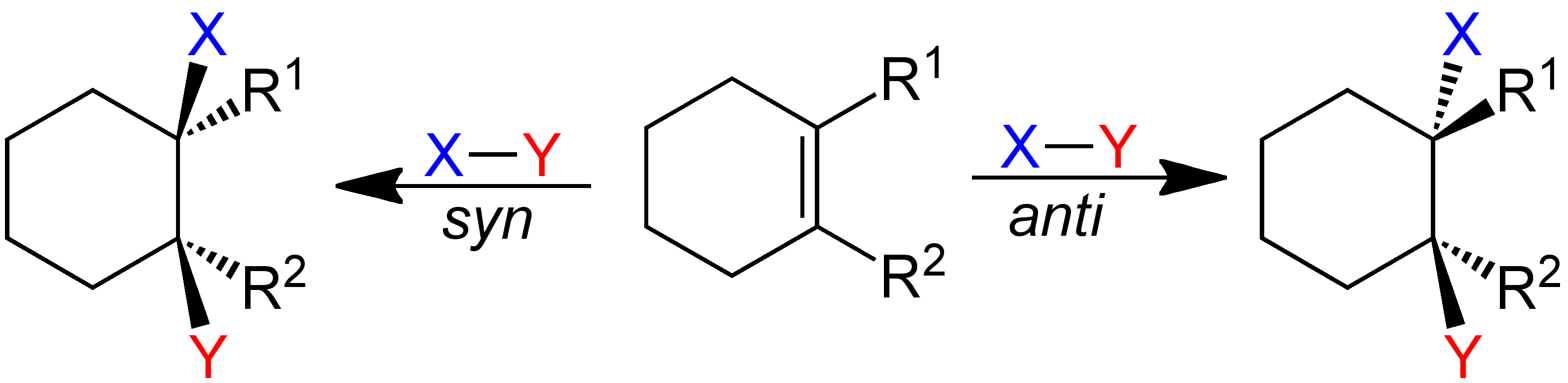
1,2-disubstituted cycloalkene undergoing syn and anti addition

Syn addition is the addition of two substituents to the same side (or face) of a double bond or triple bond, resulting in a decrease in bond order but an increase in number of substituents. Generally the substrate will be an alkene or alkyne. An example of syn addition would be the oxidation of an alkene to a diol by way of a suitable oxidizing agent such as osmium tetroxide, OsO_{4}, or potassium permanganate, KMnO_{4}.

Anti addition is in direct contrast to syn addition. In anti addition, two substituents are added to opposite sides (or faces) of a double bond or triple bond, once again resulting in a decrease in bond order and increase in number of substituents. The classical example of this is halogenation of alkenes. An anti addition reaction results in a trans-isomer of the products, as the substituents are on opposite faces of the bond.

Depending on the substrate double bond, addition can have different effects on the molecule. After addition to a straight-chain alkene such as ethene (C_{2}H_{4}), the resulting alkane will rapidly and freely rotate around its single sigma bond under normal conditions (i.e. room temperature). Thus whether substituents are added to the same side (syn) or opposite sides (anti) of a double can usually be ignored due to free rotation. However, if chirality or the specific absolute orientation of the substituents needs to be taken into account, knowing the type of addition is significant. Unlike straight-chain alkenes, cycloalkene syn addition allows stable addition of substituents to the same side of the ring, where they remain together. The cyclic locked ring structure prevents free rotation.

Syn elimination and anti elimination are the reverse processes of syn and anti addition. These result in a new double bond, such as in E_{i} elimination.

== Reactions and their addition type ==
Common reactions and respective addition types
Name	Example	Classification notes (type of addition, molecule location, regiochemistry, stereochemistry, etc.)
Hydrohalogenation		Can occur either in syn or anti addition fashion, depending on the solution it is in; 50% of each orientation. This reaction is considered Markovnikov because the halogen substituent attaches to the more substituted carbon.
Hydration		Can occur either in syn or anti addition fashion, depending on the solution it is in; 50% of each orientation. This reaction is considered Markovnikov because the hydroxyl group attaches to the more substituted carbon.
Alkene oxymercuration-demercuration		Stereospecific: Can only be anti addition – water kicks out the mercury from underneath the intermediate three-membered ring. The reaction is considered Markovnikov as it results in water addition with same regiospecificity as a direct hydration reaction.
Alkene hydroboration-oxidation		Stereospecific: Can only be syn addition – hydrogen and hydroxyl (-OH) are added to the same face. The reaction is anti-Markovnikov. Hydroxyl attaches to the less substituted carbon.
Halogenation		Stereospecific: Can only be anti-addition – both halogen molecules are on different planes. Neither Markovnikov or anti-Markovnikov because the substituents are the same.
Dihydroxylation		Can occur either in syn or anti addition fashion depending on the specific mechanism followed.: If osmium tetroxide is used, hydroxide groups are added in syn fashion.; If an epoxide mechanism is followed, hydroxide groups are added in an anti fashion.; Neither Markovnikov or anti-Markovnikov because the substituents are the same.
Hydrobromination		Stereospecific: Can be syn or anti addition, depending on situation. When alkenes undergo hydrobromination, the alkyl bromides are formed Markovnikov.
Alkyne oxymercuration-demercuration		In this reaction, HgSO_{4} reacts with an alkyne in a Markovnikov regioselective manner to form an enol that is tautomerized into a ketone. This process utilizes anti addition of an OH group to the more substituted carbon, making this reaction a Markovnikov reaction.
Alkyne hydroboration-oxidation		In this reaction, a disiamylborane reaction, disiamylborane is added to one face of the triple bond. The boron atom attaches to the less substituted carbon, and later forms a bond between the more substituted carbon and the OH group. This reaction utilizes syn addition.
