= Electrophilic addition =

Chemical reaction

The overall reaction for electrophilic addition to ethylene.

In organic chemistry, an electrophilic addition (A_{E}) reaction is an addition reaction where a chemical compound containing a double or triple bond has a π bond broken, with the formation of two new σ bonds.

The driving force for this reaction is the formation of an electrophile X^{+} that forms a covalent bond with an electron-rich, unsaturated C=C bond. The positive charge on X is transferred to the carbon-carbon bond, forming a carbocation during the formation of the C-X bond.

In the second step of an electrophilic addition, the positively charge on the intermediate combines with an electron-rich species to form the second covalent bond. The second step is the same nucleophilic attack process found in an S_{N}1 reaction. The exact nature of the electrophile and the nature of the positively charged intermediate are not always clear and depend on reactants and reaction conditions.

In all asymmetric addition reactions to carbon, regioselectivity is important and often determined by Markovnikov's rule. Organoborane compounds give anti-Markovnikov additions. Electrophilic attack to an aromatic system results in electrophilic aromatic substitution rather than an addition reaction.

== Typical electrophilic additions ==
Typical electrophilic additions to alkenes with reagents are:

- Halogen addition reactions: X_{2}
- Hydrohalogenations: HX
- Hydration reactions: H_{2}O
- Hydrogenations: H_{2}
- Oxymercuration reactions: mercuric acetate, water
- Hydroboration-oxidation reactions: diborane
- the Prins reaction: formaldehyde, water
