= Hydroboration–oxidation reaction =

Chemical reaction that converts an alkene to an alcohol

Hydroboration–oxidation reaction is a two-step hydration reaction that converts an alkene into an alcohol. The process results in the syn addition of a hydrogen and a hydroxyl group where the double bond had been. Hydroboration–oxidation is an anti-Markovnikov reaction, with the hydroxyl group attaching to the less-substituted carbon. The reaction thus provides a more stereospecific and complementary regiochemical alternative to other hydration reactions such as acid-catalyzed addition and the oxymercuration–reduction process. The reaction was first reported by Herbert C. Brown in the late 1950s and it was recognized in his receiving the Nobel Prize in Chemistry in 1979.

The general form of the reaction is as follows:

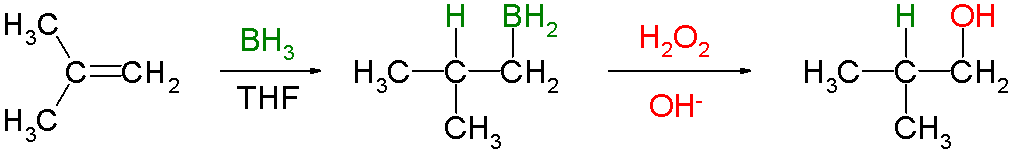

Tetrahydrofuran (THF) is the archetypal solvent used for hydroboration.

== Mechanism and scope ==
=== Hydroboration step ===
In the first step, borane (BH_{3}) adds to the double bond, transferring one of the hydrogen atoms to the carbon adjacent to the one that becomes bonded to the boron. This hydroboration is repeated two additional times, successively reacting each B–H bond so that three alkenes add to each BH_{3}. The hydroboration step is a concerted process, as no carbocation is produced, meaning that no rearrangement occurs. The resulting trialkylborane is treated with hydrogen peroxide in the second step. This process replaces the B-C bonds with HO-C bonds. The boron reagent is converted to boric acid. The reaction was originally described by H.C. Brown in 1957 for the conversion of 1-hexene into 1-hexanol.

Hexanol synthesis

Knowing that the group containing the boron will be replaced by a hydroxyl group, it can be seen that the initial hydroboration step determines the regioselectivity. Hydroboration proceeds in an anti-Markovnikov manner. The reaction sequence is also stereospecific, giving syn addition (on the same face of the alkene): the hydroboration is syn-selective and the oxidation replaces the boron with hydroxyl having the same geometric position. Thus 1-methylcyclopentene reacts with diborane predominantly to give trans-1-hydroxy-2-methylcyclopentane—the newly added H and OH are cis to each other.

Until all hydrogens attached to boron have been transferred away, the boron group BH_{2} will continue adding to more alkenes. This means that one mole of hydroborane will undergo the reaction with three moles of alkene. Furthermore, it is not necessary for the hydroborane to have more than one hydrogen. For example, reagents of the type R_{2}BH are commonly used, where R can represents the remainder of the molecule. Such modified hydroboration reagents include 9-BBN, catecholborane, and disiamylborane. These modified hydroboration agents; however, will only proceed to the monoalkylborane stage, as they only contain a single B-H bond.

=== Oxidation step ===
In the second step of the reaction sequence, the nucleophilic hydroperoxide anion attacks the boron atom. Alkyl migration to oxygen gives the alkyl borane with retention of stereochemistry (in reality, the reaction occurs via the trialkyl borate B(OR)_{3}, rather than the monoalkyl borinic ester BH_{2}OR).

Hydroboration–oxidation mechanism

The H atom in the reaction comes from B_{2}H_{6} and the O atom comes from hydrogen peroxide (H_{2}O_{2}), while the O attached H atom comes from the solvent.

== Alkyne hydroboration ==
A hydroboration reaction also takes place on alkynes. Again the mode of action is syn and secondary reaction products are aldehydes from terminal alkynes and ketones from internal alkynes. In order to prevent hydroboration across both the pi bonds, a bulky borane like disiamyl (di-sec-iso-amyl) borane is used.

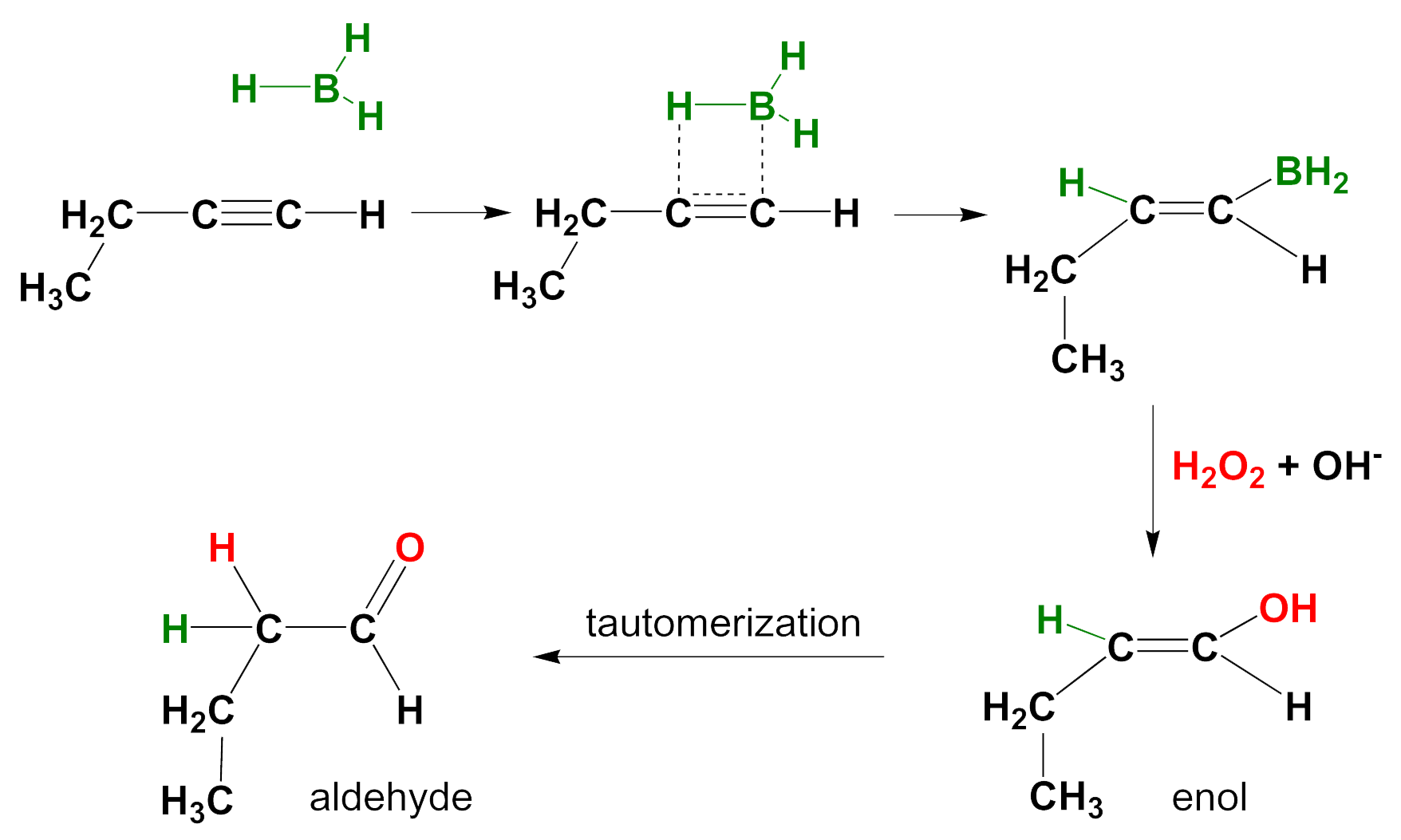
Hydroboration–oxidation of terminal alkyne

== Alternative oxidations ==
Use of other oxidants instead of hydrogen peroxide can lead to carbonyl products rather than alcohols from alkenes. N-Methylmorpholine N-oxide with catalytic tetrapropylammonium perruthenate converts the alkylborane into a carbonyl, thus a ketone or aldehyde product depending on what other groups were attached to that carbon in the original alkene. Various dichromates or related chromium(VI) reagents give ketones as well, but give carboxylic acids instead of aldehydes for terminal alkenes.

== Other oxidation substrates ==
Aside from boranes, the oxidation of silanes and disilanes can also yield hydroxy groups. A major difference is that while silyl groups like the phenyldimethylsilyl group are converted to the hydroxy group after acid or other electrophile treatment followed by oxidation by hydrogen peroxide, disilanyl groups are converted after TBAF treatment followed by peroxide oxidation. This allows for selective oxidation of either group.
