= Morris S. Kharasch =

American chemist (1895–1957)

- Born: August 24, 1895; Russian Empire (Ukraine)
- Died: October 9, 1957 (aged 62)
- Scientific career
- Notable students: Herbert C. Brown; Frank R. Mayo

Morris Selig Kharasch (August 24, 1895 – October 9, 1957) was a pioneering organic chemist best known for his work with free radical additions and polymerizations. He defined the peroxide effect, explaining how an anti-Markovnikov orientation could be achieved via free radical addition. Kharasch was born in the Russian Empire in 1895 and immigrated to the United States at the age of 13. In 1919, he completed his Ph.D. in chemistry at the University of Chicago and spent most of his professional career there.

Most of his research in the 1920s focused on organo-mercuric derivatives. He synthesized an important anti-microbial alkyl mercuric sulfur compound, thimerosal, commercially known as Merthiolate, which he patented in 1928 and assigned to the pharmaceutical company Eli Lilly and Company. Merthiolate was introduced as a vaccine preservative in 1931, and by the late 1980s thimerosal was used in all whole-cell DPT vaccines. Nobel laureate Herbert C. Brown was one of his students during the 1930s.

When World War II began, the US government recognized the need for a synthetic rubber and employed the best chemists around to aid in this effort. In 1942, Kharasch joined the American Synthetic Rubber Research Program and applied his knowledge of radical reactions to aid in the polymerization of synthetic styrene. In his later years, Kharasch devoted his attention to studying the Grignard reaction and in 1954 co-authored a book with O. Reinmuth entitled Grignard Reactions of Nonmetallic Substances.

== Proposal for anti-Markovnikov addition: The peroxide effect ==
In 1869, a Russian chemist named Vladimir Markovnikov demonstrated that the addition of HBr to alkenes usually but not always resulted in a specific orientation. Markovnikov's rule, which stems from these observations, states that in the addition of HBr or another hydrogen halide to an alkene, the acidic proton will add to the less substituted carbon of the double bond. This directed addition of a proton results in the more thermodynamically stable carbocation intermediate, as determined by degrees of substitution; more highly substituted carbocations are stabilized by the electron-pushing inductive effect of the surrounding carbon molecules.

Kharasch, in his seminal 1933 paper entitled "The Addition of Hydrogen Bromide to Allyl Bromide", proposed that the anti-Markovnikov addition of HBr to allyl bromide to yield 1,3-dibromopropane was due to the presence of peroxides. He termed this the "peroxide effect", which he proposed proceeds through a free radical chain reaction addition. Elsewhere in the literature, other examples of anti-Markovnikov additions were observed by Whitmore and Homeyer as well as Sherril, Mayer and Walter, all of whom rejected Kharasch's conclusions. They instead argued that the direction in which the reaction proceeds is determined not by the presence or absence of peroxides, but by the nature of the solvent in which the reaction is taking place. In this paper, Kharasch analyzed one at a time the effects of temperature, solvent, and light on the direction in which the reaction proceeded. He concluded that the presence of peroxides was the driving force for anti-Markovnikov addition and that any changes in temperature, solvent, or light affected the orientation of addition only through the chemistry of the peroxides.

Once Kharasch began determining the dibromopropane compositions of the products under various conditions, he made a startling discovery. When allyl bromide reacted with HBr in vacuo (in the absence of air or other oxygen source), the average reaction time took about 10 days with an approximate yield of 88%, the majority of which was the expected (according to Markovnikov's rule) 1,2-dibromopropane (65-85%). In contrast, when the reaction was run in the presence of air or oxygen, it lasted a markedly shorter time (with great variation), in one case only taking one hour to reach completion. More importantly, however, is that the major product of these additions was the 1,3-dibromopropane, constituting approximately 87% of the product. Since the only apparent variable that had changed was the presence of oxygen (other gases found in air were tested individually and did not show the same effect), Kharasch hypothesized that the rapid anti-Markovnikov addition of HBr to allyl bromide was the result of trace amounts of peroxide in the reaction mixture that could have resulted from the interaction of molecular oxygen in its diradical triplet state and allyl bromide to form allyl bromide peroxide. From there, the weak peroxide O-O bond (~51 kcal/mol)(3) could be cleaved by incident light, causing homolytic cleavage and creating the peroxide radical. Even trace amounts of this allyl bromide peroxide radical would then be sufficient to begin a chain reaction whereby a hydrogen atom would be abstracted from the HBr, leaving a Br radical. This Br radical would then combine with an electron from the double bond of allyl bromide at the less-highly substituted carbon, giving the more stable 2^{o} radical. Reaction of this radical with another HBr molecule would cause the abstraction of another H atom and would complete the anti-Markovnikov addition. Since the Br radical is regenerated, the reaction would continue to proceed at a fairly quick pace until the reactants were exhausted and/or the radical species were terminated.

== Establishment of the peroxide effect ==
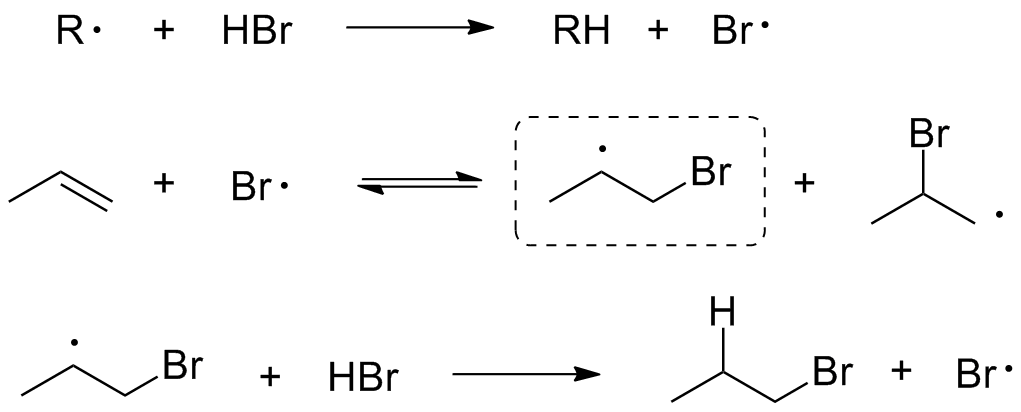
Mechanistic underpinnings of the "peroxide effect".

The validity of Kharasch's proposal rested on the existence of peroxide in the reaction mixture, of which he had no direct evidence. Because he had no means of isolating the proposed allyl bromide peroxide, he performed an adapted version of the thiocyanate test, an analytical test that is often employed to check shelf-stored reagents for their peroxide content. In addition to the thiocyanate test, Kharasch further supported the idea of a peroxide-induced chain reaction by showing that the addition of antioxidants to the reaction mixture caused the reaction to proceed in aerobic conditions much as it would have if it were in vacuo, producing the slowly forming 1,2-dibromopropane. The job of an antioxidant is to act as a radical scavenger, either accepting or donating an electron to a radical species. The is that the radical becomes effectively neutralized, while the antioxidant itself becomes a radical. Antioxidants, however, are much less reactive radicals as they are usually rather large and resonance stabilized aromatic compounds, and therefore prevent undesired oxidations from occurring. The addition of antioxidants in the reaction mixture in this experiment would effectively quench the peroxide radicals, and therefore the reaction would then proceed to form (mainly) the 1,2 –dibromopropane product, as was observed.

== Effect of temperature on addition orientation ==
Because other experimenters had reported anti-Markovnikov products and had attributed them to other factors, Kharasch addressed several variables to see if they also had an effect on the orientation of HBr addition to allyl bromide. Although an increase in temperature at first glance seemed to direct the orientation of the addition to the anti-Markovnikov product, Kharasch explained that this temperature effect must be viewed as secondary to the peroxide effect, exemplified by the fact that the addition of antioxidants at elevated temperatures can produce a high 1,2- dibromopropane yield.

== Effect of solvent on addition orientation ==
Next Kharasch observed the effect of different solvents on the orientation of addition, which his opponents proposed was the cause of other observed anti-Markovnikov products. He chose solvents with a wide range of dielectric constants (i.e. polarities). In the presence of air, the solvents with a high dielectric constant tended to form the 1,2- product while the solvents with low dielectric constant tended to form the 1,3- product. However, these results could also be viewed in accord with the peroxide effect theory; many of the solvents with high dielectric constants were able to act as antioxidants themselves, therefore quenching any radical formation and promoting the 1,2- addition whereas the solvents of low dielectric constant often had little or no antioxidant ability and so the 1,3- addition proceeded uninhibited. Kharasch concluded that the solvent may contribute to the orientation of addition if it 1.) has an effect on the stability of the peroxide or its radical 2.) prevents the initial formation of the peroxide or 3.) differentially affects the rates of the competing addition reactions. Kharasch went on further to show that when both the temperature and the solvent were varied together, they still acted independently of one another, in the manners described above. Kharasch also showed that strong illumination at a variety of wavelengths favored the 1,3- addition, but in the presence of strong antioxidants the electrophilic addition was favored, exhibiting that this variable too only exerts its effects through affecting the reactivity of the peroxide.

== Future implications of his work ==
The research conducted by Kharasch prompted further studies of free radical reactions. From this continued research, industrial polymerization reactions of unsaturated hydrocarbons were discovered and mass production of synthetic rubber and plastics was possible. Through similar radical processes, standard alkanes are halogenated and made substantially more reactive. This allows them to be very useful intermediates in organic syntheses. While standard conditions generally support one orientation of addition, in some cases it may be advantageous to have the halide on the less highly substituted carbon, in the anti-Markovnikov position. In this case a free radical addition step may be the key to obtaining the desired ultimate product, and is possible because of the work of Morris Kharasch.

Timeline of Kharasch's Life and Work
1895	Born in Ukraine
1908	Moves to Chicago
1919	Obtains PhD from the University of Chicago
1928	Patents Merthiolate (thimerosal)
1931	Thimerosal is first used in vaccines
1933	Publishes "The Peroxide Effect in the Addition of Reagents to Unsaturated Compounds
1936	Founds the Journal of Organic Chemistry
1942	Works on the government sponsored wartime project "The American Synthetic Rubber Research Program"
1949	Receives the Scott Award from the Franklin Institute
1952	Receives the Richards Medal from the American Chemical Society
1957	Death
