= Thiyl radical =

In chemistry, a thiyl radical has the formula RS, sometimes written RS^{•} to emphasize that they are free radicals. R is typically an alkyl or aryl substituent. Because S–H bonds are about 20% weaker than C–H bonds, thiyl radicals are relatively easily generated from thiols (RSH). Thiyl radicals are regularly invoked as intermediates in some biochemical reactions.

== Formation ==
Thiyl radicals are generated by hydrogen-atom abstraction from thiols. The radical initiator AIBN is proposed to generate thiyl radicals from thiols:

RN=NR → 2 R^{•} + N_{2}
R^{•} + R′SH → R′S^{•} + RH

Thiyl radicals rapidly formation by the action of OH^{·} radical (k = 6.8 × 10^{9} M^{−1}s^{−1}) on thiols. and decreases through the H^{·} radical (k = 6.8 × 10^{9} M^{−1}s^{−1}) down to peroxyl radicals R-CHOO^{·} (k = 4.2 × 10^{3} M^{−1}s^{−1}).

== Structure ==
Thiyl radicals have rarely been isolated and purified. Claims of their existence have been often disputed, reflecting their high reactivity.

=== Reactions ===
The main reaction of thiyl radicals their reversion to disulfides:

2 RS· → RS−SR

Thiyl radicals are intermediates in the thiol-ene reaction, which is the basis of some polymeric coatings and adhesives. Thiyl radicals catalyze diverse reactions involving unsaturated substrates.

== Thiyl radical in biology ==
Thiyl radicals in vivo primarily are derived from the amino acid residue cysteine.

Thiyl radicals are involved in the mechanism of action of ribonucleotide reductase, an enzyme that catalyzes the formation of deoxyribonucleotides from ribonucleotides. It catalyzes this formation by removing the 2'-hydroxyl group of the ribose ring of nucleoside diphosphates (or triphosphates depending on the class of RNR).

Other important substrates of thiyl radicals in biological systems are lipids, where thiyl radicals promote peroxidation. In this process, thiyl radicals act as chain transfer catalysts by transferring the unpaired electron to a new lipid, thereby. Other substrates of thiyl radicals include other proteins (k = 1.4 × 10^{5} M^{−1}s^{−1}), monounsaturated fatty acids (MUFAs) (k = 1.6 × 10^{5} M^{−1}s^{−1}), and ubiquinone (k = 2.5 × 10^{3} M^{−1}s^{−1}). The addition of lipophilic thiols in cell culture or administration to C. elegans accelerated lipid peroxidation, caused damage to membrane proteins and was associated with a decline in polyunsaturated fatty acids (PUFAs) and a shortened lifespan.

=== Elimination of thiyl radicals ===
Phenolic antioxidants, such as ubiquinone or α-tocopherol, are inefficient scavengers of thiyl radicals. and α-tocopherol is also not present in sufficient quantities to scavenge thiyl radicals. Nonetheless, both compounds have high rate constants for their reaction with peroxyl radicals, highlighting their evolutionary importance as scavengers. Isoprenoid polyenes, such as carotenoids like lycopene, react at very high rates with thiyl radicals (up to 10^{9} M^{−1}s^{−1}). In aqueous media ascorbic acid and glutathione react rapidly with thiyl radicals (>10^{8} M^{−1}s^{−1}) and are present in high concentrations. Thus, in aqueous environments, thiyl radicals can be effectively neutralized by these antioxidants.
