= Azobisisobutyronitrile =

- The chemical structure of AIBN

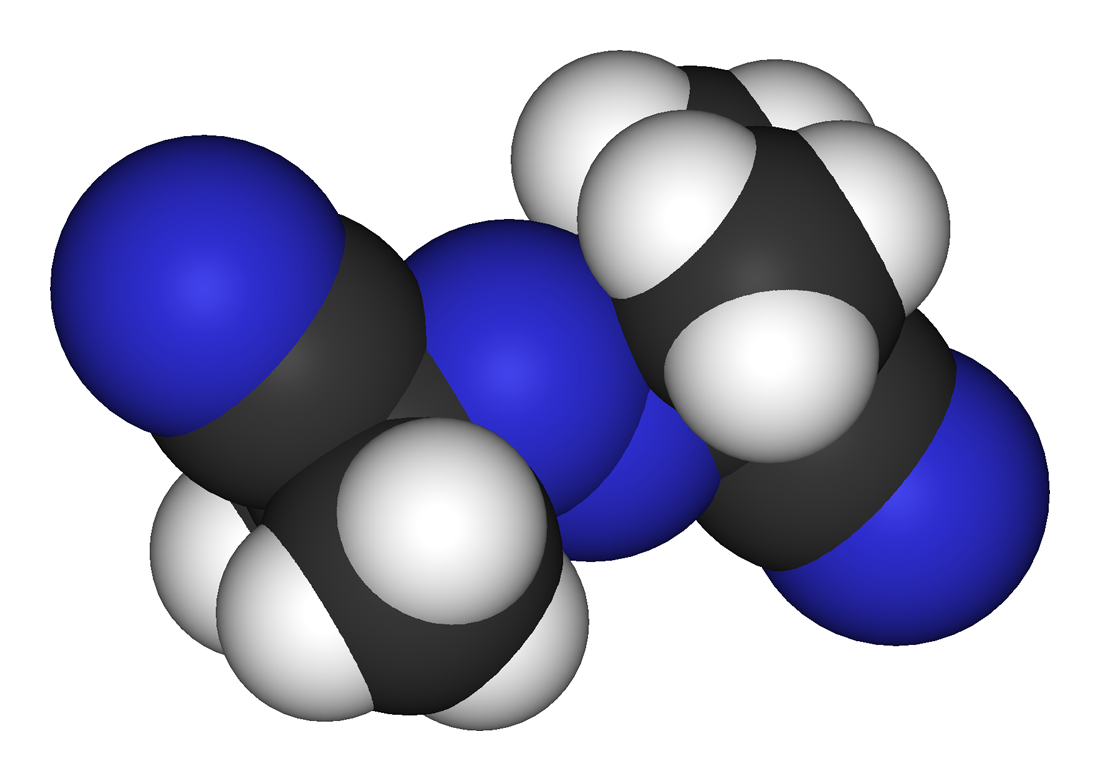
- 3D model of the AIBN molecule

Names
- IUPAC name 2,2′-Azobis(2-methylpropionitrile), 2-(azo(1-cyano-1-methylethyl))-2-methylpropane nitrile
- Other names Azobisisobutyronitrile; Azobisisobutylonitrile; AIBN

Identifiers
CAS Number	78-67-1
3D model (JSmol)	Interactive image
Abbreviations	AIBN
ChemSpider	6299
ECHA InfoCard	100.001.030
EC Number	201-132-3
PubChem CID	6547
RTECS number	UG0800000
UNII	FZ6PX8U5YB
UN number	3234 1325
CompTox Dashboard (EPA)	DTXSID70859108 DTXSID1026457, DTXSID70859108
- InChI: InChI=1S/C8H12N4/c1-7(2,5-9)11-12-8(3,4)6-10/h1-4H3/b12-11+ Key: OZAIFHULBGXAKX-VAWYXSNFSA-N; InChI=1/C8H12N4/c1-7(2,5-9)11-12-8(3,4)6-10/h1-4H3/b12-11+ Key: OZAIFHULBGXAKX-VAWYXSNFBT
- SMILES: CC(C)(C#N)/N=N/C(C)(C)C#N

Properties
Chemical formula	C_{8}H_{12}N_{4}
Molar mass	164.21 g/mol
Appearance	white crystals
Density	1.1 g cm^{−3}
Melting point	103 to 105 °C (217 to 221 °F; 376 to 378 K)
Solubility in water	poor

Hazards
- GHS labelling
Pictograms	(GHS02: Flammable) (GHS07: Exclamation mark)
Signal word	Warning
Hazard statements	H242, H302, H332, H412
Precautionary statements	P210, P220, P234, P261, P264, P270, P271, P273, P280, P301+P312, P304+P312, P304+P340, P312, P330, P370+P378, P403+P235, P411, P420, P501
- Except where otherwise noted, data are given for materials in their standard state (at 25 °C [77 °F], 100 kPa). verify (what is ?) Infobox references

Azobisisobutyronitrile (abbreviated AIBN) is an organic compound with the formula [(CH_{3})_{2}C(CN)]_{2}N_{2}. This white powder is soluble in alcohols and common organic solvents but is insoluble in water. It is often used as a foamer in plastics and rubber and as a radical initiator.

As an azo initiator, radicals resulting from AIBN have multiple benefits over common organic peroxides. For example, they do not have oxygenated byproducts or much yellow discoloration. Additionally, they do not cause too much grafting and therefore are often used when making adhesives, acrylic fibers, detergents, etc.

== Mechanism of decomposition ==
In its most characteristic reaction, AIBN decomposes, eliminating a molecule of nitrogen gas to form two 2-cyanoprop-2-yl radicals:

Because azobisisobutyronitrile readily gives off free radicals, it is often used as a radical initiator. This happens at temperatures above 40 °C, but in experiments is more commonly done at temperatures between 66 °C and 72 °C. This decomposition has a ΔG^{‡} of 131 kJ/mol and results in two 2-cyano-2-propyl (carbon) radicals and a molecule of nitrogen gas. The release of nitrogen gas pushes this decomposition forward due to the increase in entropy. And the 2-cyano-2-propyl radical is stabilized by the −CN group.

== Chemical reactions ==
These radicals formed by the decomposition of AIBN can initiate free-radical polymerizations and other radical-induced reactions. For instance, a mixture of styrene and maleic anhydride in toluene will react if heated, forming the copolymer upon addition of AIBN. Another example of a radical reaction that can be initiated by AIBN is the anti-Markovnikov hydrohalogenation of alkenes. AIBN has also been used as the radical initiator for Wohl–Ziegler bromination. The AIBN-derived 2-cyano-2-propyl radical abstracts the hydrogen from tributyltin hydride. The resulting tributyltin radical can be used for removal of a bromine atom.

AIBN-derived radicals abstract a hydrogen from HBr to give a bromine radical, which can add to alkenes. This type of hydrohalogenation of an alkene proceeds with anti-Markovnikov selectivity.

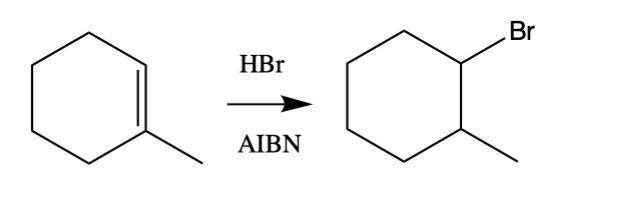

== Production ==
AIBN is produced in two steps from acetone cyanohydrin. Reaction with hydrazine gives the substituted dialkylhydrazine. In the second step, the hydrazine is oxidized to the azo derivative:

2 (CH_{3})_{2}C(CN)OH + N_{2}H_{4} → [(CH_{3})_{2}C(CN)]_{2}N_{2}H_{2} + 2 H_{2}O
[(CH_{3})_{2}C(CN)]_{2}N_{2}H_{2} + Cl_{2} → [(CH_{3})_{2}C(CN)]_{2}N_{2} + 2 HCl

== Analogues ==
Related azo compounds behave similarly, such as 1,1′-azobis(cyclohexanecarbonitrile). Water-soluble azo initiators are also available. 2,2′-Azobis(2,4-dimethyl-4-methoxyvaleronitrile) is more labile than AIBN, allowing polymerizations are mild temperatures.

== Safety ==
AIBN is safer to use than benzoyl peroxide (another radical initiator) because the risk of explosion is far less. However, it is still considered as an explosive compound, decomposing above 65 °C. A respirator dust mask, protective gloves and safety glasses are recommended. Pyrolysis of AIBN without a trap for the formed 2-cyanopropyl radicals results in the formation of tetramethylsuccinonitrile, which is highly toxic.
