= Oxymercuration reaction =

Chemical reaction of an alkene with mercuric acetate to form an alcohol

Oxymercuration reaction

In organic chemistry, the oxymercuration reaction is a chemical reaction that uses mercury salts to transform an alkene (R_{2}C=CR_{2}) into an alcohol. The alkene reacts with mercuric acetate (AcO−Hg−OAc), an electrophile, to yield an organomercury compound, which is subsequently transformed. The intermediate features an acetoxymercury (−HgOAc) group and a hydroxy (−OH) group attached to adjacent carbon atoms. Carbocations are not formed in this process, and thus rearrangements are not observed. The reaction follows Markovnikov's rule (the hydroxy group always add to the more substituted carbon). The oxymercuration part of the reaction involves anti addition of OH group. On the other hand, the demercuration part of the reaction involves free radical mechanism and is not stereospecific, i.e. H and OH may be syn or anti to each other.

Oxymercuration followed by reductive demercuration is called an oxymercuration–reduction reaction or oxymercuration–demercuration reaction. This reaction, which is almost always done in practice instead of oxymercuration, is treated at the conclusion of the article.

== Mechanism ==
Oxymercuration can be fully described in three steps (the whole process is sometimes called deoxymercuration), which is illustrated in stepwise fashion to the right. In the first step, the nucleophilic double bond attacks the mercury ion, ejecting an acetoxy group. The electron pair on the mercury ion in turn attacks a carbon on the double bond, forming a mercurinium ion in which the mercury atom bears a positive charge. The electrons in the highest occupied molecular orbital of the double bond are donated to mercury's empty 6s orbital. In principle, and, as depicted in almost all sophomore organic chemistry textbooks, the electrons in mercury's d_{xz} (or d_{yz}) orbital are donated into the lowest unoccupied molecular orbital of the double bond, the π* orbital, through backbonding. However, modern quantum chemical calculations indicate that in the case of mercury and other group 12 elements, the energetic contribution of d orbital backbonding to the metal-alkene complex is essentially nonexistent, the 5d orbitals being far too low-lying to allow for efficient interaction with the π* orbital. Thus, the textbook depiction of the intermediate π complex as a three-membered ring mercurinium ion is unrealistic, though it is convenient for pedagogical reasons (allowing for arrow pushing to be shown analogously to that of halonium ion mediated halogenation reactions).

In the second step, the nucleophilic water molecule attacks the more substituted carbon, liberating the electrons participating in its bond with mercury. The electrons collapse to the mercury ion and neutralize it. The oxygen in the water molecule now bears a positive charge.

In the third step, a negatively charged acetate ion deprotonates the alkyloxonium ion, forming the waste product HOAc. The two electrons participating in the bond between oxygen and the attacked hydrogen collapse into the oxygen, neutralizing its charge and creating the final alcohol product.

Curved-arrow mechanism for the oxymercuration reaction.

== Regioselectivity and stereochemistry ==
Oxymercuration is very regioselective and is a textbook Markovnikov reaction; ruling out extreme cases, the water nucleophile will always preferentially attack the more substituted carbon, depositing the resultant hydroxy group there. This phenomenon is explained by examining the three resonance structures of the mercuronium ion formed at the end of the step one.

By inspection of these structures, it is seen that the positive charge of the mercury atom will sometimes reside on the more substituted carbon (approximately 4% of the time). This forms a temporary tertiary carbocation, which is a very reactive electrophile. The nucleophile will attack the mercuronium ion at this time. Therefore, the nucleophile attacks the more substituted carbon because it retains a more positive character than the lesser substituted carbon.

Stereochemically, oxymercuration is an anti addition. As illustrated by the second step, the nucleophile cannot attack the carbon from the same face as the mercury ion because of steric hindrance. There is simply insufficient room on that face of the molecule to accommodate both a mercury ion and the attacking nucleophile. Therefore, when free rotation is impossible, the hydroxy and acetoxymercuri groups will always be trans to each other.

Shown below is an example of regioselectivity and stereospecificity of the oxymercuration reaction with substituted cyclohexenes. A bulky group like t-butyl locks the ring in a chair conformation and prevents ring flips. With 4-t-butylcyclohexene, oxymercuration yields two products – where addition across the double bond is always anti – with slight preference towards acetoxymercury group trans to the t-butyl group, resulting in slightly more cis product. With 1-methyl-4-t-butylcyclohexene, oxymercuration yields only one product – still anti addition across the double bond – where water only attacks the more substituted carbon. The reason for anti addition across the double bond is to maximize orbital overlap of the lone pair of water and the empty orbital of the mercuronium ion on the opposite side of the acetoxymercury group. Regioselectivity is observed to favor water attacking the more substituted carbon, but water does not add syn across the double bond which implies that the transition state favors water attacking from the opposite side of the acetomercury group.

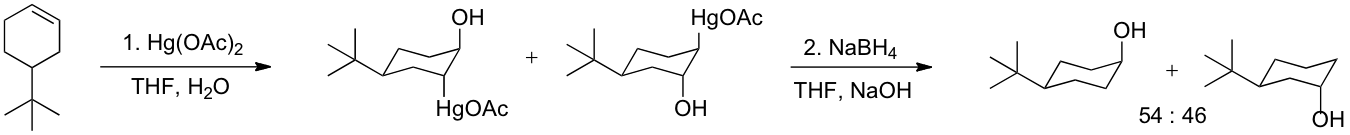
Oxymercuration stereospecificity

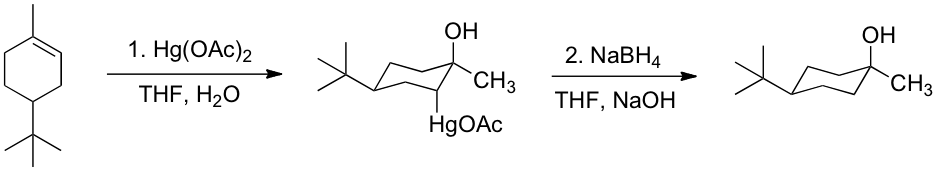
Oxymercuration regioselectivity

== Oxymercuration–reduction ==
In practice, the mercury adduct product created by the oxymercuration reaction is almost always treated with sodium borohydride (NaBH_{4}) in aqueous base in a reaction called demercuration. In demercuration, the acetoxymercury group is replaced with a hydrogen in a stereochemically insensitive reaction known as reductive elimination. The combination of oxymercuration followed immediately by demercuration is called an oxymercuration–reduction reaction.

Therefore, the oxymercuration-reduction reaction is the net addition of water across the double bond. Any stereochemistry set up by the oxymercuration step is scrambled by the demercuration step, so that the hydrogen and hydroxy group may be cis or trans from each other. Oxymercuration reduction is a popular laboratory technique to achieve alkene hydration with Markovnikov selectivity while avoiding carbocation intermediates and thus the rearrangement which can lead to complex product mixtures.

== Other applications ==
Oxymercuration is not limited to an alkene reacting with water to add hydroxyl and mercury groups. The carbon–mercury structure can undergo spontaneous replacement of the mercury by hydrogen, rather than persisting until a separate reduction step. In this manner, the effect is for mercury to be a Lewis acid catalyst. For example, using an alkyne instead of an alkene yields an enol, which tautomerizes into a ketone. Using an alcohol instead of water yields an ether (see also Hofmann-Sand reaction). In both cases, Markovnikov's rule is observed.

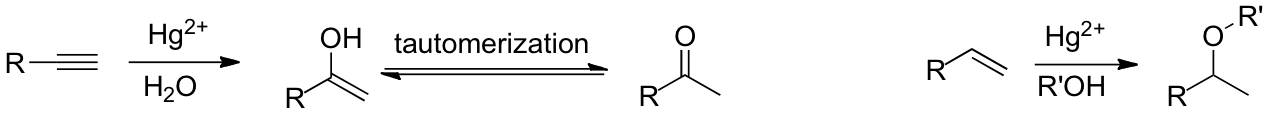
Other applications of oxymercuration

Using a vinyl ether in the presence of an alcohol allows the replacement of one alkoxy group (RO–) for another by way of an acetal intermediate. An allyl alcohol and a vinyl ether under the conditions of oxymercuration–reaction can give R–CH=CH–CH_{2}–O–CH=CH_{2}, which is suitable for a Claisen rearrangement.

Mercury-catalyzed enol ether exchange

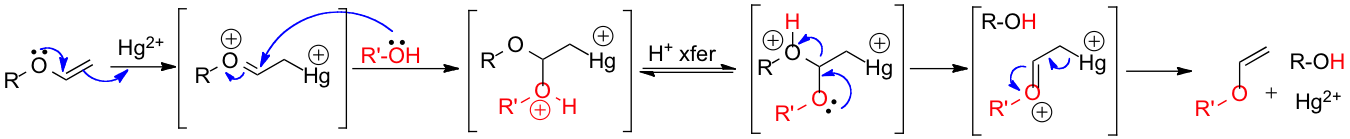
Mechanism mercury-catalyzed enol ether exchange

== See also ==
- Hydroboration–oxidation reaction
- Mukaiyama hydration
