= Organic reaction =

Chemical reactions involving organic compounds

Organic reactions are chemical reactions involving organic compounds. The basic organic chemistry reaction types are addition reactions, elimination reactions, substitution reactions, pericyclic reactions, rearrangement reactions, photochemical reactions and redox reactions. In organic synthesis, organic reactions are used in the construction of new organic molecules. The production of many man-made chemicals such as drugs, plastics, food additives, fabrics depend on organic reactions.

The oldest organic reactions are combustion of organic fuels and saponification of fats to make soap. Modern organic chemistry starts with the Wöhler synthesis in 1828. In the history of the Nobel Prize in Chemistry awards have been given for the invention of specific organic reactions such as the Grignard reaction in 1912, the Diels–Alder reaction in 1950, the Wittig reaction in 1979 and olefin metathesis in 2005.

The Claisen rearrangement

== Classifications ==
Organic chemistry has a strong tradition of naming a specific reaction to its inventor or inventors and a long list of so-called named reactions exists, conservatively estimated at 1000. A very old named reaction is the Claisen rearrangement (1912) and a recent named reaction is the Bingel reaction (1993). When the named reaction is difficult to pronounce or very long as in the Corey–House–Posner–Whitesides reaction it helps to use the abbreviation as in the CBS reduction. The number of reactions hinting at the actual process taking place is much smaller, for example the ene reaction or aldol reaction.

Another approach to organic reactions is by type of organic reagent, many of them inorganic, required in a specific transformation. The major types are oxidizing agents such as osmium tetroxide, reducing agents such as lithium aluminium hydride, bases such as lithium diisopropylamide and acids such as sulfuric acid.

Finally, reactions are also classified by mechanistic class. Commonly these classes are (1) polar, (2) radical, and (3) pericyclic. Polar reactions are characterized by the movement of electron pairs from a well-defined source (a nucleophilic bond or lone pair) to a well-defined sink (an electrophilic center with a low-lying antibonding orbital). Participating atoms undergo changes in charge, both in the formal sense as well as in terms of the actual electron density. The vast majority of organic reactions fall under this category. Radical reactions are characterized by species with unpaired electrons (radicals) and the movement of single electrons. Radical reactions are further divided into chain and nonchain processes. Finally, pericyclic reactions involve the redistribution of chemical bonds along a cyclic transition state. Although electron pairs are formally involved, they move around in a cycle without a true source or sink. These reactions require the continuous overlap of participating orbitals and are governed by orbital symmetry considerations. Of course, some chemical processes may involve steps from two (or even all three) of these categories, so this classification scheme is not necessarily straightforward or clear in all cases. Beyond these classes, transition-metal mediated reactions are often considered to form a fourth category of reactions, although this category encompasses a broad range of elementary organometallic processes, many of which have little in common and very specific.

== Fundamentals ==
Factors governing organic reactions are essentially the same as that of any chemical reaction. Factors specific to organic reactions are those that determine the stability of reactants and products such as conjugation, hyperconjugation and aromaticity and the presence and stability of reactive intermediates such as free radicals, carbocations and carbanions.

An organic compound may consist of many isomers. Selectivity in terms of regioselectivity, diastereoselectivity and enantioselectivity is therefore an important criterion for many organic reactions. The stereochemistry of pericyclic reactions is governed by the Woodward–Hoffmann rules and that of many elimination reactions by Zaitsev's rule.

Organic reactions are important in the production of pharmaceuticals. In a 2006 review, it was estimated that 20% of chemical conversions involved alkylations on nitrogen and oxygen atoms, another 20% involved placement and removal of protective groups, 11% involved formation of new carbon–carbon bond and 10% involved functional group interconversions.

== By mechanism ==
There is no limit to the number of possible organic reactions and mechanisms. However, certain general patterns are observed that can be used to describe many common or useful reactions. Each reaction has a stepwise reaction mechanism that explains how it happens, although this detailed description of steps is not always clear from a list of reactants alone. Organic reactions can be organized into several basic types. Some reactions fit into more than one category. For example, some substitution reactions follow an addition-elimination pathway. This overview isn't intended to include every single organic reaction. Rather, it is intended to cover the basic reactions.

| Reaction type | Subtype | Comment |
|---|---|---|
| Addition reactions | electrophilic addition | include such reactions as halogenation, hydrohalogenation and hydration. |
| Addition reactions | nucleophilic addition | include such reactions as halogenation, hydrohalogenation and hydration. |
| Addition reactions | radical addition | include such reactions as halogenation, hydrohalogenation and hydration. |
| Elimination reaction | | include processes such as dehydration and are found to follow an E1, E2 or E1cB reaction mechanism |
| Substitution reactions | nucleophilic aliphatic substitution | with S_{N}1, S_{N}2 and S_{N}i reaction mechanisms |
| Substitution reactions | nucleophilic aromatic substitution | |
| Substitution reactions | nucleophilic acyl substitution | |
| Substitution reactions | electrophilic substitution | |
| Substitution reactions | electrophilic aromatic substitution | |
| Substitution reactions | radical substitution | |
| Organic redox reactions | | are redox reactions specific to organic compounds and are very common. |
| Rearrangement reactions | 1,2-rearrangements | |
| Rearrangement reactions | pericyclic reactions | |
| Rearrangement reactions | metathesis | |

In condensation reactions a small molecule, usually water, is split off when two reactants combine in a chemical reaction. The opposite reaction, when water is consumed in a reaction, is called hydrolysis. Many polymerization reactions are derived from organic reactions. They are divided into addition polymerizations and step-growth polymerizations.

In general the stepwise progression of reaction mechanisms can be represented using arrow pushing techniques in which curved arrows are used to track the movement of electrons as starting materials transition to intermediates and products.

== By functional groups ==
Organic reactions can be categorized based on the type of functional group involved in the reaction as a reactant and the functional group that is formed as a result of this reaction. For example, in the Fries rearrangement the reactant is an ester and the reaction product an alcohol.

An overview of functional groups with their preparation and reactivity is presented below:

| Functional group | Preparation | Reactions |
|---|---|---|
| Acid anhydride | preparation | reactions |
| Acyl halides | preparation | reactions |
| Acyloins | preparation | reactions |
| Alcohols | preparation | reactions |
| Aldehydes | preparation | reactions |
| Alkanes | preparation | reactions |
| Alkenes | preparation | reactions |
| Alkyl halides | preparation | reactions |
| Alkyl nitrites | preparation | reactions |
| Alkynes | preparation | reactions |
| Amides | preparation | reactions |
| Amine oxide | preparation | reactions |
| Amines | preparation | reactions |
| Arene compounds | preparation | reactions |
| Azides | preparation | reactions |
| Aziridines | preparation | reactions |
| Carboxylic acids | preparation | reactions |
| Cyclopropanes | preparation | reactions |
| Diazo compounds | preparation | reactions |
| Diols | preparation | reactions |
| Esters | preparation | reactions |
| Ethers | preparation | reactions |
| Epoxide | preparation | reactions |
| Haloketones | preparation | reactions |
| Imines | preparation | reactions |
| Isocyanates | preparation | reactions |
| Ketones | preparation | reactions |
| Lactams | preparation | reactions |
| Lactones | preparation | reactions |
| Nitriles | preparation | reactions |
| Nitro compounds | preparation | reactions |
| Phenols | preparation | reactions |
| Thiols | preparation | reactions |

== Other classification ==
In heterocyclic chemistry, organic reactions are classified by the type of heterocycle formed with respect to ring-size and type of heteroatom. See for instance the chemistry of indoles. Reactions are also categorized by the change in the carbon framework. Examples are ring expansion and ring contraction, homologation reactions, polymerization reactions, insertion reactions, ring-opening reactions and ring-closing reactions.

Organic reactions can also be classified by the type of bond to carbon with respect to the element involved. More reactions are found in organosilicon chemistry, organosulfur chemistry, organophosphorus chemistry and organofluorine chemistry. With the introduction of carbon-metal bonds the field crosses over to organometallic chemistry.

== See also ==
- List of organic reactions
- Other chemical reactions: inorganic reactions, metabolism, organometallic reactions, polymerization reactions.
- Important publications in organic chemistry
