= Vladimir Markovnikov =

Russian chemist (1837–1904)

Vladimir Vasilyevich Markovnikov
- Владимир Васильевич Марковников
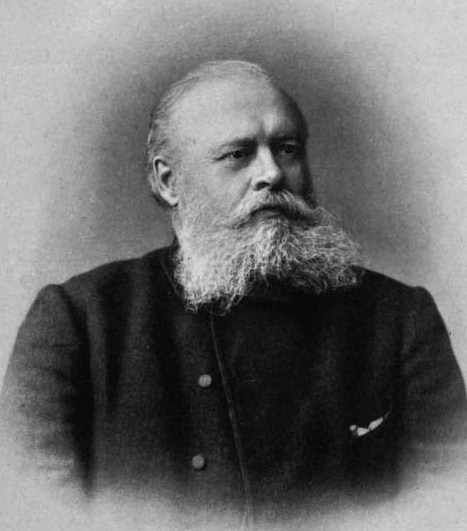
- Late 19th-century photograph of Markovnikov.
- Born: December 25, 1837; Knyaginino, Nizhny Novgorod Governorate, Russian Empire
- Died: February 11, 1904 (aged 66); Saint Petersburg, Russian Empire
- Education: University of Kazan
- Scientific career
- Workplaces: University of Kazan; University of Saint Petersburg; University of Odessa
- Doctoral advisor: Alexander Butlerov
- Doctoral students: Nikolai Kischner

Vladimir Vasilyevich Markovnikov, also Markownikoff (Russian: Влади́мир Васи́льевич Марко́вников; 25 December [O.S. 13 December] 1837 – 11 February 1904) was a Russian chemist, best known for having developed Markovnikov's rule, which describes addition reactions of hydrogen halides and alkenes.

== Early life and education ==
Vladimir Markovnikov was born on December 25, 1837, in Chernorechye near Nizhny Novgorod, Russian Empire (now Dzerzhinsk, Nizhny Novgorod Oblast, Russian Federation). Soon after his birth, his father retired and settled in a family estate received as a dowry from his wife's family at marriage, in the village of Ivanovo, Knyagininsky district of the Nizhny Novgorod province, where Markovnikov spent his early childhood.

He joined the cameral department of the law faculty of Kazan Imperial University in 1856. He moved to the natural department of the university, where he attended the lectures of A. M. Butlerov. In 1860, after completing a university course, he was left to prepare for a professorship and was appointed laboratory assistant at a chemical laboratory. In 1864 he defended his master's thesis. In the spring of 1869, he defended his doctoral dissertation.

== Personal life ==
Markovnikov married Lyubov Dmitrievna Rychkova. They had two sons, Vladimir, a politician and Nikolai, an architect.

== Career ==
After a conflict with that university, Markovnikov was appointed professor at the University of Odessa in 1871 and, two years later, at the University of Moscow, where he stayed the rest of his career. He was elected as a member to the American Philosophical Society in 1901.

=== Work ===
Markovnikov is best known for Markovnikov's rule, elucidated in 1869 to describe addition reactions of H-X (where 'X' represents a halogen) to alkenes. According to this rule, the nucleophilic X- binds to the carbon (C) atom with fewer hydrogen atoms, while the proton binds to the carbon atom with more hydrogen atoms bonded to it. Thus, hydrogen chloride (HCl) reacts with propene, CH_{3}-CH=CH_{2} to produce 2-chloropropane CH_{3}CHClCH_{3} rather than the isomeric 1-chloropropane CH_{3}CH_{2}CH_{2}Cl. The rule is useful in predicting the molecular structures of products of addition reactions. Why hydrogen bromide exhibited both Markovnikov as well as reversed-order, or anti-Markovnikov, addition, however, was not understood until Morris S. Kharasch offered an explanation in 1933. It is also called The Peroxide effect sometimes.

Hughes has discussed the reasons for Markovnikov's lack of recognition during his lifetime. Although he published mostly in Russian which was not understood by most Western European chemists, the 1870 article in which he first stated his rule was written in German. However the rule was included in a 4-page addendum to a 26-page article on isomeric butyric acids, and based on very slight experimental evidence even by the standards of the time. Hughes concludes that the rule was an inspired guess, unjustified by the evidence of the time, but which turned out later to be correct (in most cases). A more recent assessment, based on a reading of Markovnikov's Magistr Khimii and Doktor Khimii dissertations, contradicts this view, and points out that Markovnikov's Rule arises logically from his dissertations.

Markovnikov also contributed to organic chemistry by finding carbon rings with more than six carbon atoms, a ring with four carbon atoms in 1879, and a ring with seven in 1889.

Markovnikov also showed that butyric acid and isobutyric acid have the same chemical formula (C_{4}H_{8}O_{2}) but different structures; i.e., they are isomers.
