= ABCN =

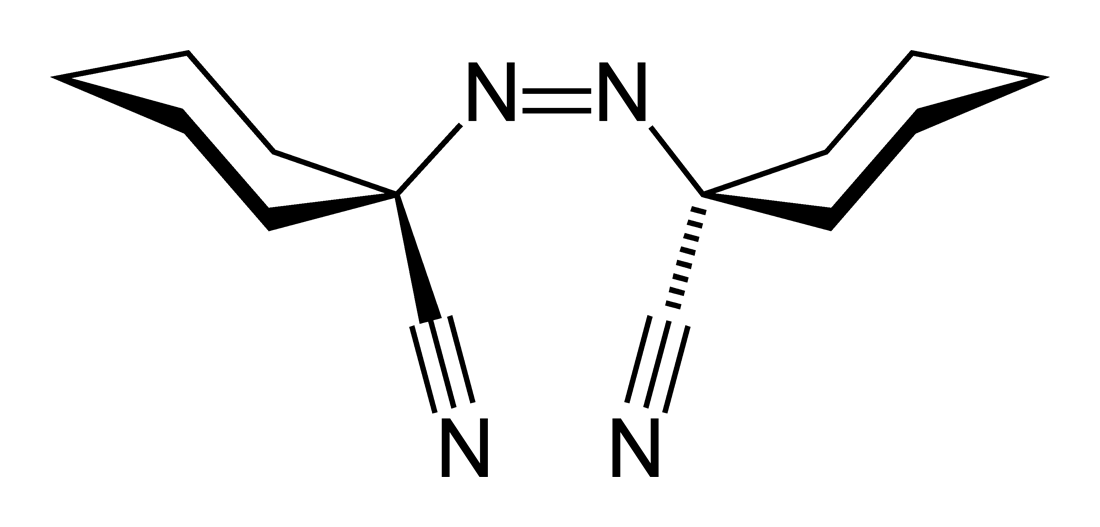
- Stereo, skeletal formula of (Z)-ABCN

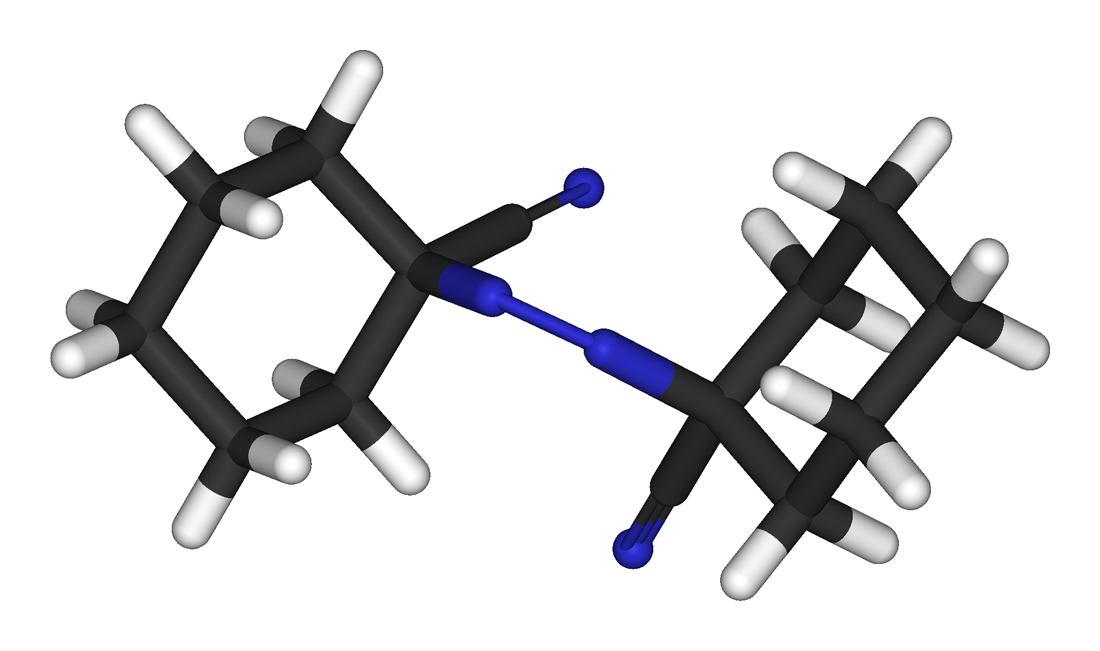
- Stick model of (Z)-ABCN

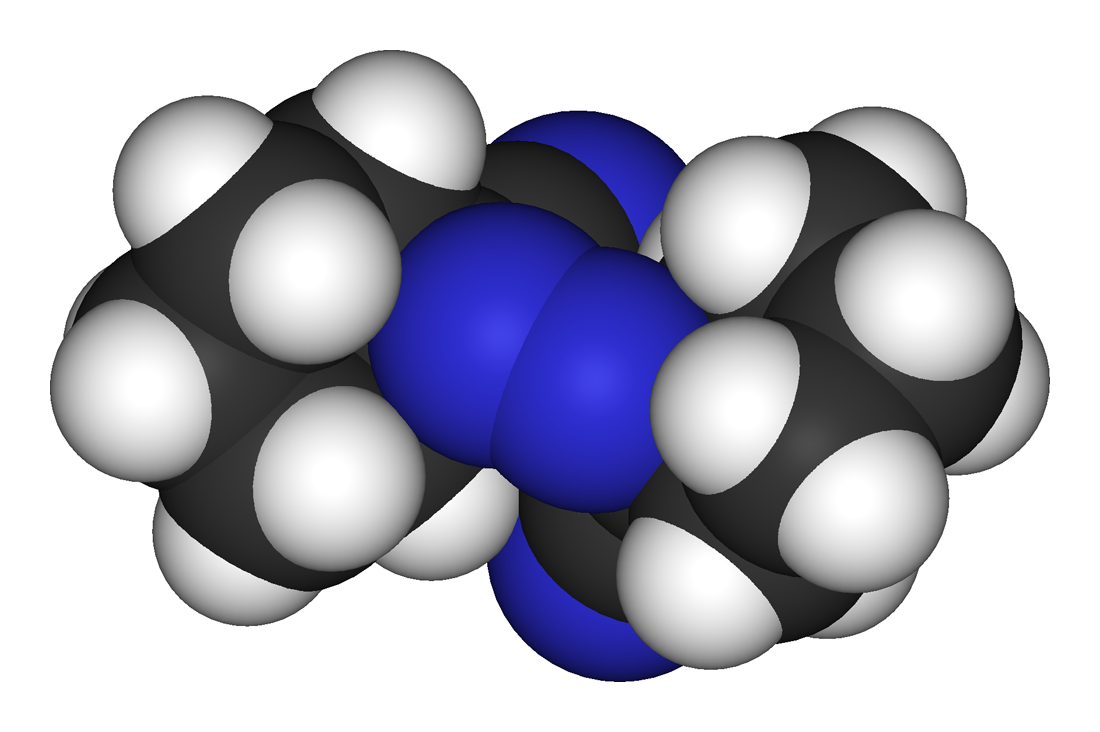
- Spacefill model of (Z)-ABCN

Names
- Systematic IUPAC name 1,1′-Diazene-1,2-diyldicyclohexanecarbonitrile

Identifiers
CAS Number	2094-98-6
3D model (JSmol)	Interactive image
Abbreviations	ACHN
Beilstein Reference	960744
ChemSpider	21159585; 67533 (E); 21427655 (Z)
ECHA InfoCard	100.016.595
EC Number	218-254-8
PubChem CID	74978
UNII	9Y0B93KKUS
UN number	3226
CompTox Dashboard (EPA)	DTXSID9044613
- InChI: InChI=1S/C14H20N4/c15-11-13(7-3-1-4-8-13)17-18-14(12-16)9-5-2-6-10-14/h1-10H2 Key: KYIKRXIYLAGAKQ-UHFFFAOYSA-N; InChI=1/C14H20N4/c15-11-13(7-3-1-4-8-13)17-18-14(12-16)9-5-2-6-10-14/h1-10H2 Key: KYIKRXIYLAGAKQ-UHFFFAOYAM
- SMILES: N#CC1(CCCCC1)N=NC1(CCCCC1)C#N

Properties
Chemical formula	C_{14}H_{20}N_{4}
Molar mass	244.342 g·mol^{−1}
Melting point	114 to 118 °C (237 to 244 °F; 387 to 391 K) decomposes near 80 °C

Hazards
- GHS labelling
Pictograms	(GHS02: Flammable) (GHS07: Exclamation mark)
Signal word	Danger
Hazard statements	H242, H315, H319, H335
Precautionary statements	P261, P305+P351+P338
- Except where otherwise noted, data are given for materials in their standard state (at 25 °C [77 °F], 100 kPa). verify (what is ?) Infobox references

1,1′-Azobis(cyclohexanecarbonitrile) or ACHN is a radical initiator. The molecular formula is NCC_{6}H_{10}N=NC_{6}H_{10}CN. It is a white solid that is soluble in aromatic solvents.

ACBN has a 10-hour half-life in toluene at 88 °C.

== See also ==
- Azobisisobutylonitrile (AIBN) is another commonly used free radical initiator
