= Dibromopropane =

Dibromopropane is a molecule that contains three carbon atoms, six hydrogen atoms, and two bromine atoms. It may refer to any of four isomers:

- 1,2-Dibromopropane
- 1,3-Dibromopropane
- 1,1-Dibromopropane
- 2,2-Dibromopropane
