= Cryptoregiochemistry =

Oxidative attack site

Cryptoregiochemistry refers to the site of initial oxidative attack in double bond formation by enzymes such as fatty acid desaturases. This is a mechanistic parameter that is usually determined through the use of kinetic isotope effect experiments, based on the premise that the initial C-H bond cleavage step should be energetically more difficult and therefore more sensitive to isotopic substitution than the second C-H bond breaking step.
