= Free-radical addition =

Organic addition reaction which involves free radicals

In organic chemistry, free-radical addition is an addition reaction which involves free radicals. These reactions can happen due to the free radicals having an unpaired electron in their valence shell, making them highly reactive. Radical additions are known for a variety of unsaturated substrates, both olefinic or aromatic and with or without heteroatoms.

Free-radical reactions depend on one or more relatively weak bonds in a reagent. Under reaction conditions (typically heat or light), some weak bonds homolyse into radicals, which then induce further decomposition in their compatriots before recombination. Different mechanisms typically apply to reagents without such a weak bond.

== Mechanism and regiochemistry ==
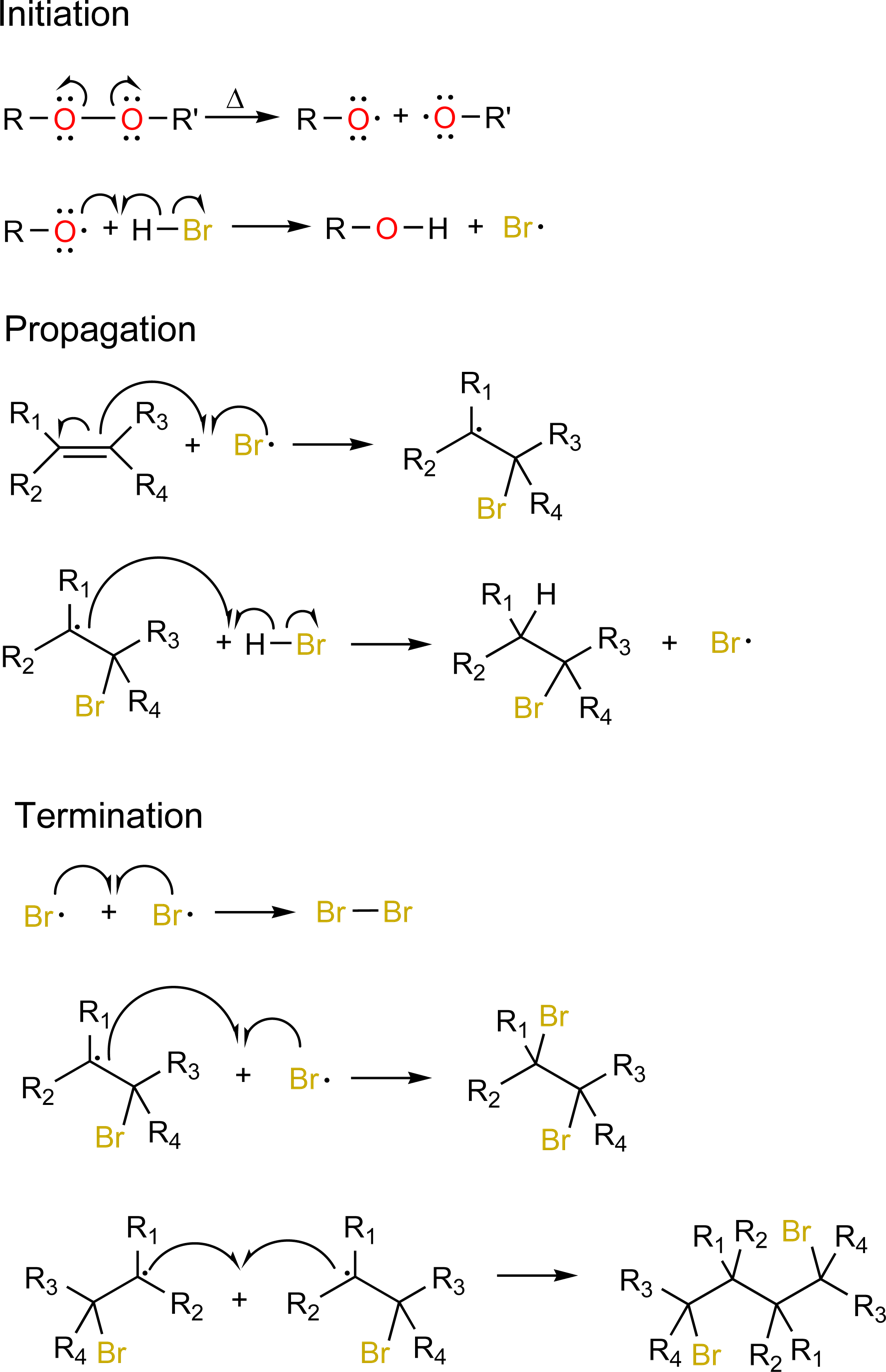
Radical hydrobromination of an alkene

The basic steps in any free-radical process (the radical chain mechanism) divide into:

- Radical initiation: A radical is created from a non-radical precursor.
- Chain propagation: A radical reacts with a non-radical to produce a new radical species
- Chain termination: Two radicals react with each other to create a non-radical species

In a free-radical addition, there are two chain propagation steps. In one, the adding radical attaches to a multiply-bonded precursor to give a radical with lesser bond order. In the other, the newly-formed radical product abstracts another substituent from the adding reagent to regenerate the adding radical.

In general, the adding radical attacks the alkene at the most sterically accessible (typically, least substituted) carbon; the radical then stabilizes on the more substituted carbon. The result is typically anti-Markovnikov addition, a phenomenon Morris Kharasch called the "peroxide effect". Reaction is slower with alkynes than alkenes.

In the paradigmatic example, hydrogen bromide radicalizes to monatomic bromine. These bromine atoms add to an alkene at the most accessible site, to give a bromoalkyl radical, with the radical on the more substituted carbon. That radical then abstracts a hydrogen atom from another HBr molecule to regenerate the monatomic bromine and continue the reaction.

== Compounds that add radically ==
Radical addition of hydrogen bromide is a valuable synthetic technique for anti-Markovnikov carbon substitution, but free-radical addition does not occur with the other hydrohalic acids. Radical formation from HF, HCl, or HI is extremely endothermic and chemically disfavored. Hydrogen bromide is incredibly selective as a reagent, and does not produce detectable quantities of polymeric byproducts.

The behavior of hydrogen bromide generalizes in two separate directions. Halogenated compounds with a relatively stable radical can dissociate from the halogen. Thus, for example, sulfonyl, sulfenyl, and other sulfur halides can add radically to give respectively β‑halo sulfones, sulfoxides, or sulfides.

Separately, unsubstituted compounds with a relative stable radical can dissociate from hydrogen. In general, these reactions risk polymerized byproducts (see § Side reactions). For example, in the thiol-ene reaction, thiols, disulfides, and hydrogen sulfide add across a double bond. But if the unsaturated substrate polymerizes easily, they catalyze polymerization instead. In thermal silane additions, telomerization usually proceeds to about 6 units.

In the case of silicon, germanium, or phosphorus, the energetics are unfavorable unless the heavy atom bears a pendant hydrogen. Other electronegative substituents on silicon appear to reduce the barrier.

Although nitrogen oxides naturally radicalize, careful control of the radical species is difficult. Dinitrogen tetroxide adds to give a mixture: a vicinal dinitro compound, but also a nitro substituent adjacent to a nitrite ester.

== To aryl radicals ==
Although aromatic resonance stabilizes aryl radicals, bonds between arenes and their substituents are (in)famously strong. Radical reactions with arenes typically present retrosynthetically as instances of nucleophilic aromatic substitution, because generating the aryl radical requires a strong (radical) leaving group. One example is the Meerwein arylation.

== Side reactions ==
A radical addition which leaves an unsaturated product can undergo radical cyclization between the two propagation steps. In general, radical additions can also start radical polymerization processes.

== With stable inorganic radicals ==
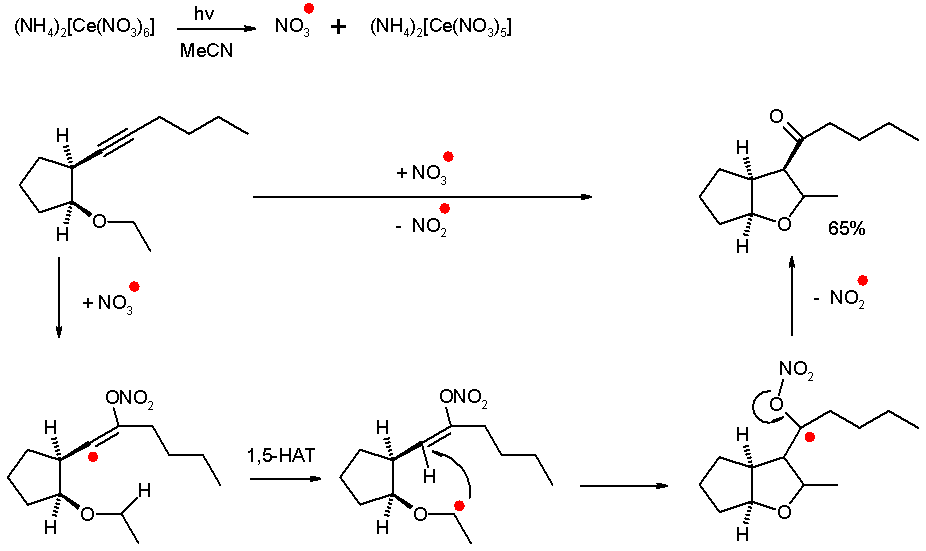
Self-terminating oxidative radical cyclization

In self-terminating oxidative radical cyclization, inorganic radicals oxidize alkynes to ketones through an intramolecular radical cyclization. This reaction is not catalytic, and requires the oxidized radical source in stoichiometric amounts. In effect, the radical species is synthetically equivalent to monatomic oxygen.

In the paradigmatic example, a nitrate radical (from photolysis of ceric ammonium nitrate) adds to an alkyne to generate a very reactive vinyl nitrate ester radical. The vinyl radical abstracts an intramolecular hydrogen atom 5 atoms away before 5-exo-trig ring-closure. The resulting alkyl nitrate radical can then fragment to a ketone and the stable radical nitrogen dioxide.

Sulfate (from ammonium persulfate) and hydroxyl radicals show similar reactivity.

== See also ==
The other radical reactions:

- radical substitution
- radical polymerization
- free-radical halogenation
