= Hydrohalogenation =

Electrophilic addition of hydrogen halides to alkenes

A hydrohalogenation reaction is the electrophilic addition of hydrogen halides like hydrogen chloride or hydrogen bromide to alkenes to yield the corresponding haloalkanes.

If the two carbon atoms at the double bond are linked to a different number of hydrogen atoms, the halogen is found preferentially at the carbon with fewer hydrogen substituents, an observation known as Markovnikov's rule. This is due to the abstraction of a hydrogen atom by the alkene from the hydrogen halide (HX) to form the most stable carbocation (relative stability: 3°>2°>1°>methyl), as well as generating a halogen anion.

A simple example of a hydrochlorination is that of indene with hydrogen chloride gas (no solvent):

Alkynes also undergo hydrohalogenation reactions. Depending on the exact substrate, alkyne hydrohalogenation can proceed though a concerted protonation/nucleophilic attack (Ad_{E}3) or stepwise by first protonating the alkyne to form a vinyl cation, followed by attack of HX/X^{−} to give the product (Ad_{E}2) (see electrophile for arrow pushing). As in the case of alkenes, the regioselectivity is determined by the relative ability of the carbon atoms to stabilize positive charge (either a partial charge in the case of a concerted transition state or a full formal charge for a discrete vinyl cation). Depending on reaction conditions, the main product could be this initially formed alkenyl halide, or the product of twice hydrohalogenation to form a dihaloalkane. In most cases, the main regioisomer formed is the gem-dihaloalkane. This regioselectivity is rationalized by the resonance stabilization of a neighboring carbocation by a lone pair on the initially installed halogen. Depending on relative rates of the two steps, it may be difficult to stop at the first stage, and often, mixtures of the mono and bis hydrohalogenation products are obtained.

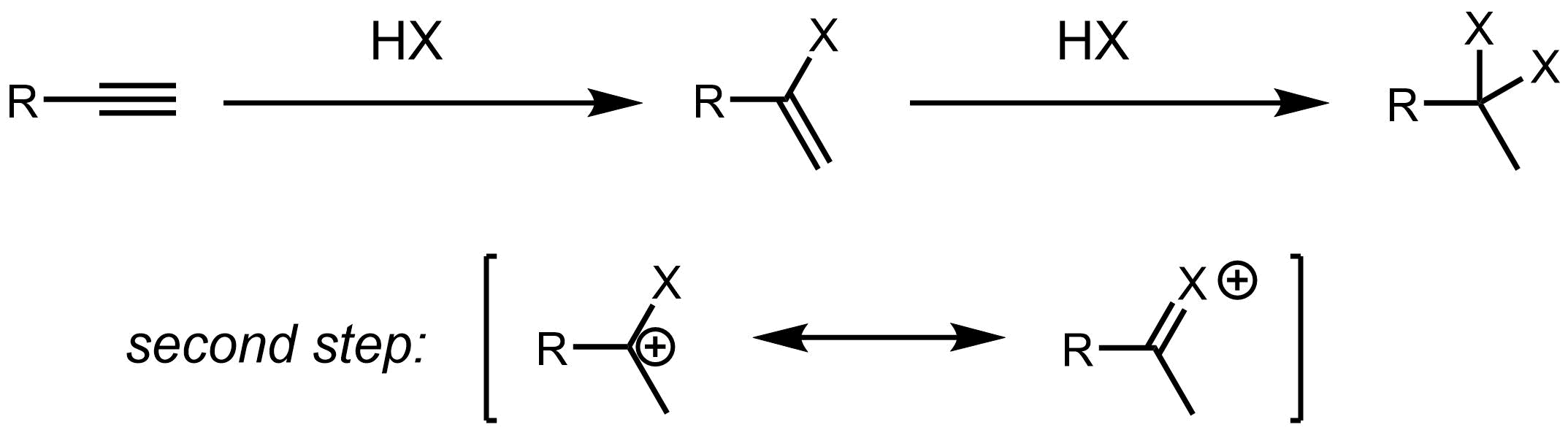

== Anti-Markovnikov addition ==
In the presence of peroxides, HBr adds to a given alkene in an anti-Markovnikov addition fashion. Regiochemistry follows from the reaction mechanism, which exhibits halogen attack on the least-hindered unsaturated carbon. The mechanism for this chain reaction resembles free radical halogenation, in which the peroxide promotes formation of the bromine radical. However, this process is restricted to addition of HBr. Of the other hydrogen halides (HF, HCl, and HI), only HCl reacts similarly, and the process is too slow for synthetic use. (With HF and HI, the energy released in the halogen-carbon addition does not suffice to cleave another hydrogen-halogen bond. Consequently the chain cannot propagate.)

The resulting 1-bromoalkanes are versatile alkylating agents. By reaction with dimethyl amine, they are precursors to fatty tertiary amines. By reaction with tertiary amines, long-chain alkyl bromides such as 1-bromododecane, give quaternary ammonium salts, which are used as phase transfer catalysts.

With Michael acceptors the addition is also anti-Markovnikov because now a nucleophilic X^{−} reacts in a nucleophilic conjugate addition for example in the reaction of HCl with acrolein.

Addition of HCl to acrolein

== Scope ==
Recent research has found that adding silica gel or alumina to H-Cl (or H-Br) in dichloromethane increases the rate of reaction making it an easy one to carry out.
