= Addition reaction =

Organic reaction in which 2+ molecules combine to form a larger one

In organic chemistry, an addition reaction is an organic reaction in which two or more molecules combine to form a larger molecule called the adduct.

An addition reaction is limited to chemical compounds that have multiple bonds. Examples include a molecule with a carbon–carbon double bond (an alkene) or a triple bond (an alkyne). Another example is a compound that has rings (which are also considered points of unsaturation). A molecule that has carbon—heteroatom double bonds, such as a carbonyl group (C=O) or imine group (C=N), can undergo an addition reaction because its double-bond.

An addition reaction is the reverse of an elimination reaction, in which one molecule divides into two or more molecules. For instance, the hydration of an alkene to an alcohol is reversed by dehydration.

There are two main types of polar addition reactions: electrophilic addition and nucleophilic addition. Two non-polar addition reactions exist as well, called free-radical addition and cycloadditions. Addition reactions are also encountered in polymerizations and called addition polymerization.

General overview of addition reactions. Top to bottom: electrophilic addition to alkene, nucleophilic addition of nucleophile to carbonyl and free-radical addition of halide to alkene

Depending on the product structure, it could promptly react further to eject a leaving group to give the addition–elimination reaction sequence.

Addition reactions are useful in analytic chemistry, as they can identify the existence and number of double bonds in a molecule. For example, bromine addition will consume a bromine solution, resulting in a color change:

$$\ce{RR'C=CR''R''' + Br2(orange-brown) ->[\ce{CCl4}] RR'CBr-BrCR''R'''(typically\ colorless)}$$

Likewise hydrogen addition often proceeds on all double-bonds of a molecule, and thus gives a count of the number of a double and triple bonds through stoichiometry:

$$\ce{{(H2C=CH)2} + 2H2 ->[\ce{Pt}/\ce{Pd}] (H3C-CH2)2}$$
