= Radical initiator =

Molecules that can produce radicals and catalyze radical reactions

In chemistry, radical initiators are substances that can produce radical species under mild conditions and promote radical reactions. These substances generally possess weak bonds—bonds that have small bond dissociation energies. Radical initiators are utilized in industrial processes such as polymer synthesis. Typical examples are molecules with a nitrogen-halogen bond, azo compounds, and organic and inorganic peroxides.

== Main types of initiation reaction ==
- Halogens undergo homolytic fission relatively easily. Chlorine, for example, gives two chlorine radicals (Cl•) by irradiation with ultraviolet light. This process is used for chlorination of alkanes.
- Azo compounds (R-N=N-R') can be the precursor of two carbon-centered radicals (R• and R'•) and nitrogen gas upon heating and/or by irradiation. For example, AIBN and ABCN yield isobutyronitrile and cyclohexanecarbonitrile radicals, respectively.

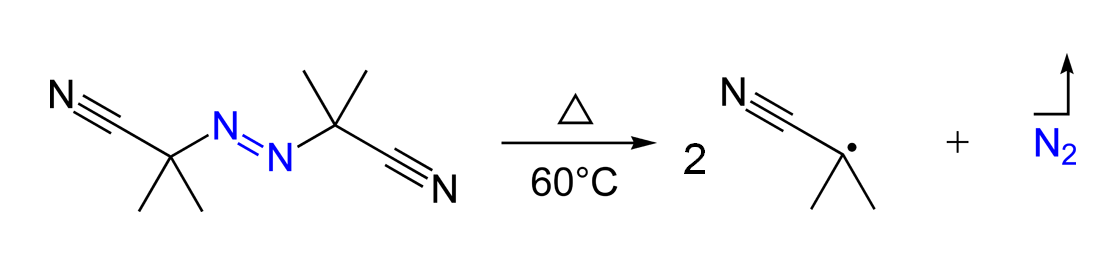

- Organic peroxides each have a peroxide bond (-O-O-), which is readily cleaved to give two oxygen-centered radicals. The oxyl radicals are unstable and believed to be transformed into relatively stable carbon-centered radicals. For example, di-tert-butyl peroxide (t-BuOOt-Bu) gives two t-butoxy radicals (t-BuO•) and the radicals become methyl radicals (CH_{3}•) with the loss of acetone. Benzoyl peroxide ((PhC)OO)_{2}) generates benzoyloxyl radicals (PhCOO•), each of which loses carbon dioxide to be converted into a phenyl radical (Ph•). Methyl ethyl ketone peroxide is also common, and acetone peroxide is on rare occasions used as a radical initiator, too.
- Inorganic peroxides function analogously to organic peroxides. Many polymers are often produced from the alkenes upon initiation with peroxydisulfate salts. In solution, peroxydisulfate dissociates to give sulfate radicals:

[O_{3}SO-OSO_{3}]^{2−} ⇌ 2 [SO_{4}]^{−}

The sulfate radical adds to an alkene forming radical sulfate esters, e.g. ^{.}CHPhCH_{2}OSO_{3}^{−}, that add further alkenes via formation of C-C bonds. Many styrene and fluoroalkene polymers are produced in this way.

- In atom transfer radical polymerization (ATRP), carbon-halides reversibly generate organic radicals in the presence of transition metal catalyst.

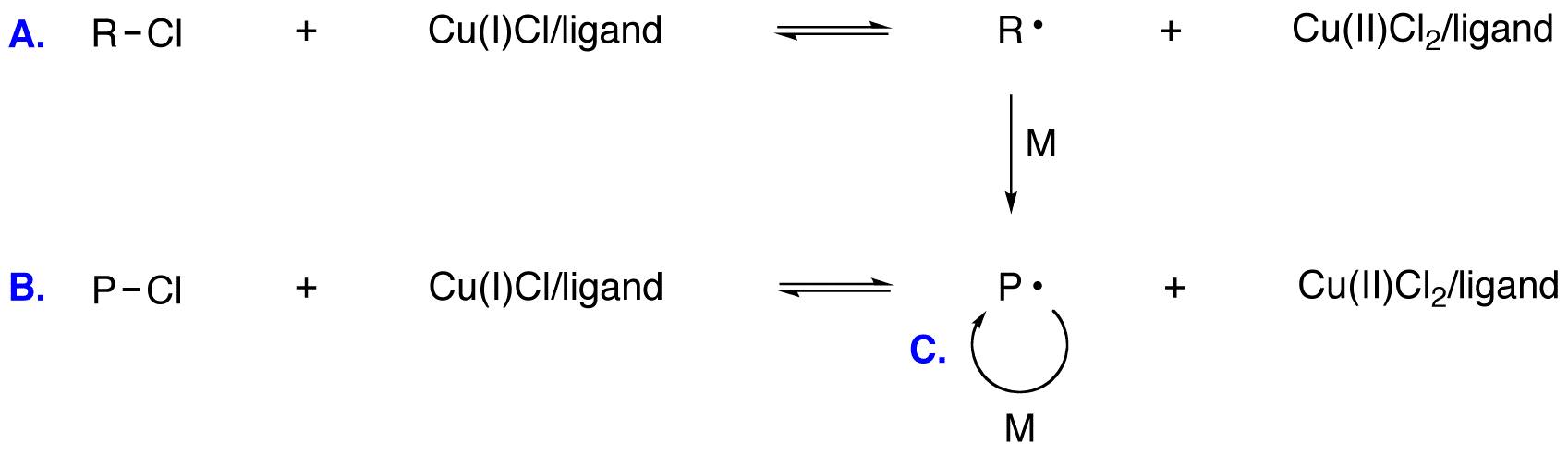
General ATRP Reaction. A. Initiation. B. Equilibrium with dormant species. C.Propagation

== Safety ==
Some radical initiators such as azo compounds and peroxides can detonate at elevated temperatures so they must be stored cold.
