= Markovnikov's rule =

Rule for predicting outcomes of some addition reactions

Markovnikov's rule is illustrated by the reaction of propene with hydrobromic acid

In organic chemistry, Markovnikov's rule or Markownikoff's rule describes the outcome of some addition reactions. It predicts which of several possible constitutional isomers is more likely. The rule was formulated by Russian chemist Vladimir Markovnikov in 1870.

== Explanation ==
The rule states that with the addition of a protic acid HX or other polar reagent to an asymmetric alkene, the acid hydrogen (H) or electropositive part gets attached to the carbon with more hydrogen substituents, and the halide (X) group or electronegative part gets attached to the carbon with more alkyl substituents. This is in contrast to Markovnikov's original definition, in which the rule states that the X component is added to the carbon with the fewest hydrogen atoms while the hydrogen atom is added to the carbon with the greatest number of hydrogen atoms.

The same is true when an alkene reacts with water in an addition reaction to form an alcohol that involves carbocation formation. The hydroxyl group (OH) bonds to the carbon that has the greater number of carbon-carbon bonds, while the hydrogen bonds to the carbon on the other end of the double bond, that has more carbon–hydrogen bonds.

The chemical basis for Markovnikov's Rule is the formation of the most stable carbocation during the addition process. Adding the hydrogen ion to one carbon atom in the alkene creates a positive charge on the other carbon, forming a carbocation intermediate. The more substituted the carbocation, the more stable it is, due to induction and hyperconjugation. The major product of the addition reaction will be the one formed from the more stable intermediate. Therefore, the major product of the addition of HX (where X is some atom more electronegative than H) to an alkene has the hydrogen atom in the less substituted position and X in the more substituted position. But the other less substituted, less stable carbocation will still be formed at some concentration and will proceed to be the minor product with the opposite, conjugate attachment of X.

== Anti-Markovnikov reactions ==
Also called Kharasch effect (named after Morris S. Kharasch), these reactions that do not involve a carbocation intermediate may react through other mechanisms that have regioselectivities not dictated by Markovnikov's rule, such as free radical addition. Such reactions are said to be anti-Markovnikov, since the halogen adds to the less substituted carbon, the opposite of a Markovnikov reaction.

The anti-Markovnikov rule can be illustrated using the addition of hydrogen bromide (HBr) to isobutylene in the presence of benzoyl peroxide or hydrogen peroxide. The reaction of HBr with substituted alkenes was prototypical in the study of free radical additions. Early chemists discovered that the reason for the variability in the ratio of Markovnikov to anti-Markovnikov reaction products was due to the unexpected presence of free radical ionizing substances such as peroxides. The explanation is that the O-O bond in peroxides is relatively weak. With the aid of light, heat, or sometimes even just acting on its own, the O-O bond can split to form two radicals. The radical groups can then interact with HBr to produce a bromine radical, which then reacts with the double bond. Since the bromine atom is relatively large, it is more likely to encounter and react with the least substituted carbon since this interaction produces less static interactions between the carbon and the bromine radical. Furthermore, similar to a positively charged chemical species, the radical species is most stable when the unpaired electron is in the more substituted position. The radical intermediate is stabilized by hyperconjugation. In the more substituted position, more carbon-hydrogen bonds are aligned with the radical's electron deficient molecular orbital. This means that there are greater hyperconjugation effects, so that position is more favorable. In this case, the terminal carbon is a reactant that produces a primary addition product instead of a secondary addition product.

Free-radical intermediate is stabilized by hyperconjugation; adjacent occupied sigma C–H orbitals donate into the electron-deficient radical orbital.

Another method of anti-Markovnikov addition has been described by Hamilton and Nicewicz, who utilize aromatic molecules and light energy from a low-energy diode to turn the alkene into a cation radical.

Anti-Markovnikov behaviour extends to more chemical reactions than additions to alkenes. Anti-Markovnikov behaviour is observed in the hydration of phenylacetylene by auric catalysis, which gives acetophenone; although with a special ruthenium catalyst it provides the other regioisomer 2-phenylacetaldehyde:

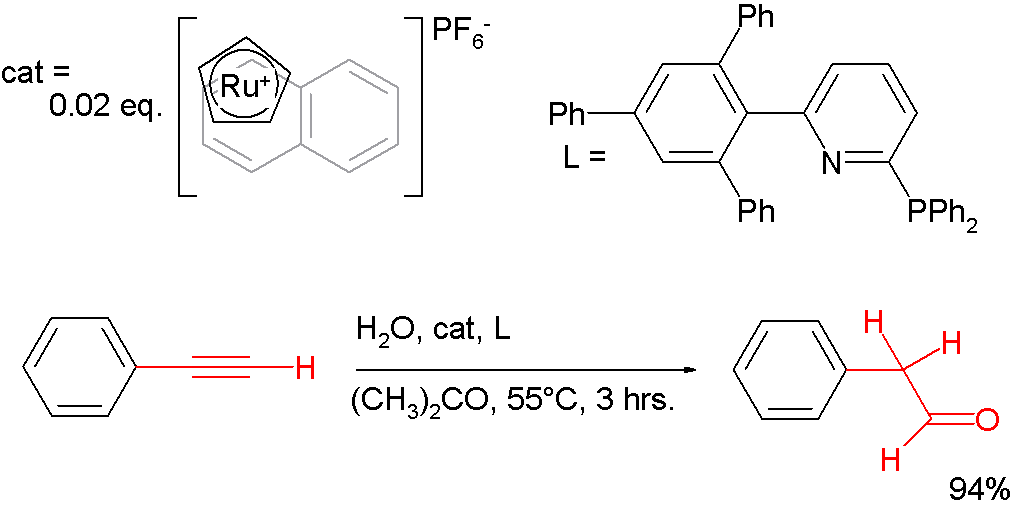
Anti-Markovnikov hydration

Anti-Markovnikov behavior can also manifest itself in certain rearrangement reactions. In a titanium(IV) chloride-catalyzed formal nucleophilic substitution at enantiopure 1 in the scheme below, two products are formed – 2a and 2b. Due to the two chiral centers in the target molecule, the carbon carrying chlorine and the carbon carrying the methyl and acetoxyethyl group, four different compounds are to be formed: 1R,2R- (drawn as 2b) 1R,2S- 1S,2R- (drawn as 2a) and 1S,2S- . Therefore, both of the depicted structures will exist in a D- and an L-form.

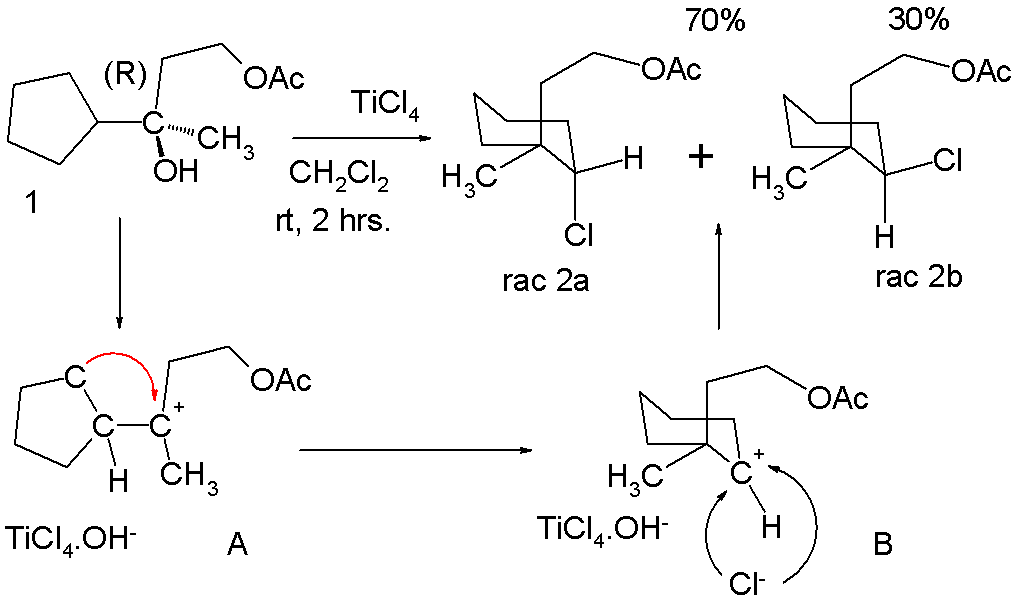
Anti-Markovnikov rearrangement

This product distribution can be rationalized by assuming that loss of the hydroxy group in 1 gives the tertiary carbocation A, which rearranges to the seemingly less stable secondary carbocation B. Chlorine can approach this center from two faces leading to the observed mixture of isomers.

Another notable example of anti-Markovnikov addition is hydroboration.

== See also ==
- Kharasch addition
- Zaitsev's rule
- Hofmann's rule
