= Hillhead High School =

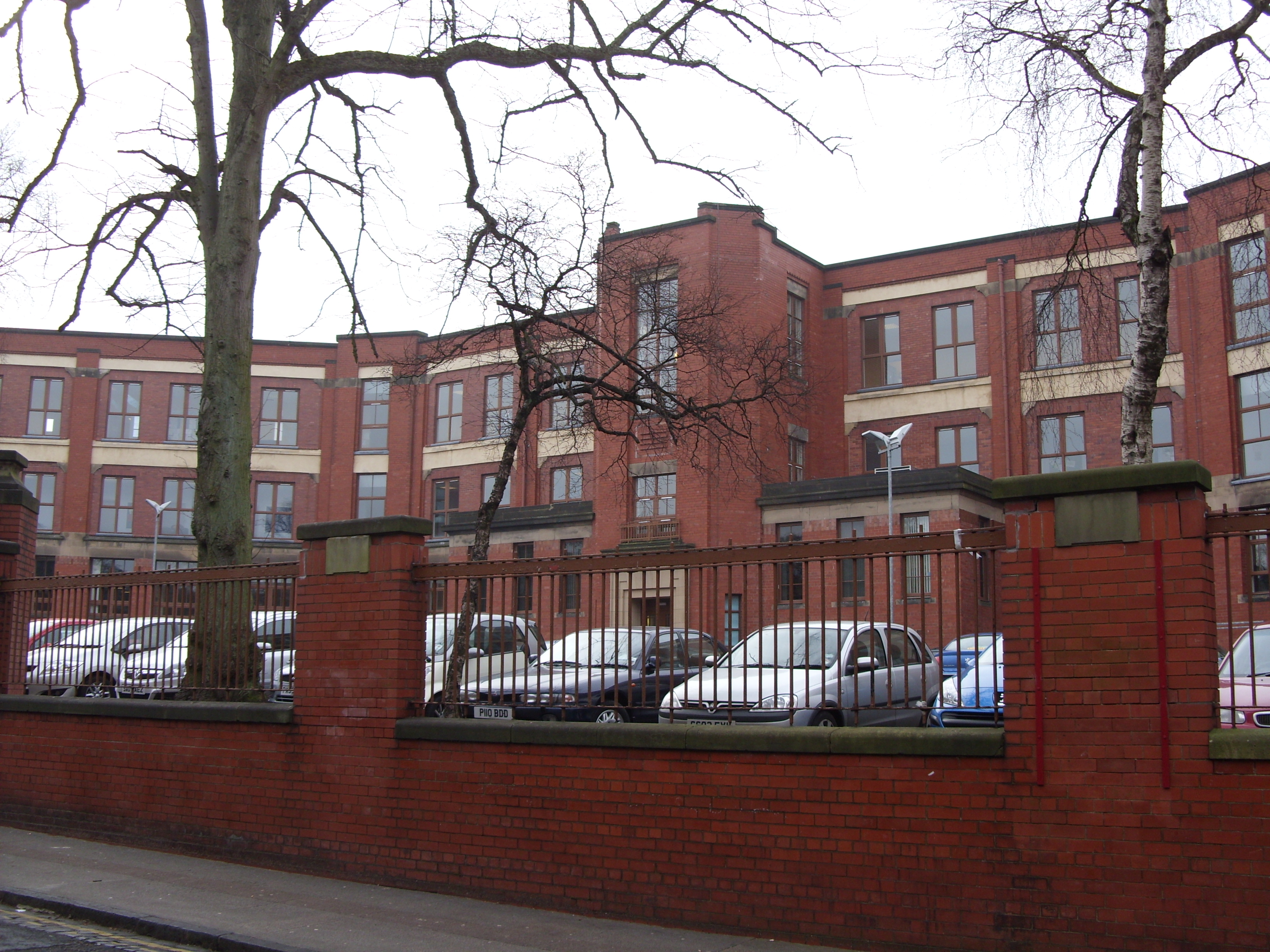
- The main building of Hillhead High School

Location
- Oakfield Avenue; Glasgow, G12 8LJ; Scotland; 55.87455°N 4.28538°W

Information
- Motto: Nous maintiendrons (French for "We shall maintain")
- Established: 1885 (as Hillhead Primary School)
- Head teacher: Karen McAlaney
- Staff: ~90
- Gender: Coeducational
- Age: 12 to 18
- Enrolment: 1080 (September 2018)
- Colours: black, white, red, blue
- Athletics: Hillhead Badminton Club; Hillhead Football Club; Hillhead Hockey Club; Hillhead Basketball Club; Hillhead Cricket Club
- School Years: S1-S6
- Website: https://blogs.glowscotland.org.uk/gc/hillheadhigh/

Hillhead High School is a day school in Glasgow, Scotland, on Oakfield Avenue, neighbouring the University of Glasgow.

== Admissions ==
It is one of the largest schools in Glasgow.

== History ==
=== Grammar school ===
Until 1972 it was a co-educational selective school. It then became a comprehensive school.

=== Comprehensive ===
In 1972 the local authority in Glasgow abolished the selectivity process and the school gradually became a comprehensive school serving its geographical catchment area of Glasgow's West End, and serving many pupils from wider afield who had attended the primary school.

=== Former teachers ===
- Colin Campbell, SNP MSP from 1999 to 2003 for West of Scotland (taught from 1961 to 1963)
- Ann Dunlop Alexander painter, engraver and art teacher

== School facilities ==
The school has two buildings, the Main Building and the Terrace Building. It also uses the nearby Wellington Church for mass assemblies at October, Christmas, Easter and Summer.

The X-shaped listed Main Building, acquired in the 1930s, is the larger of the two buildings, and is where most pupils begin their studies. Most of the school's classrooms and offices are situated on its four floors. Also in the Main Building is the library, where a career and exam advisor makes biweekly appearances. The main building was designed by E G Wylie in 1921, and construction finished in 1929. It is now protected as a category B listed building.

Originally owned by the University of Glasgow, the Terrace Building was acquired by Hillhead in c.2001. This building is used primarily for applied studies.

== Notable former pupils ==
- Don Arrol, Glaswegian comedian and presenter of Sunday Night at the London Palladium in the early sixties
- Stanley Baxter, Glaswegian actor
- Menzies Campbell, former leader of the Liberal Democrats
- Kari Corbett, actress
- Prof Gordon Younger Craig, FRSE, geologist, James Hutton Professor of Geology 1967–84 University of Edinburgh, founder trustee of Our Dynamic Earth
- Prof Jack D. Dunitz, Professor of Chemical Crystallography from 1957 to 1990 at ETH Zurich, and known for the Bürgi–Dunitz angle
- Sir Alastair Dunnett, journalist and newspaper editor, Editor from 1956 to 1972 of The Scotsman, and from 1946 to 1955 of the Daily Record
- Islam Feruz, first footballer to play for Scotland under the school qualification rule
- Alexander Fleck, 1st Baron Fleck, chairman from 1953 to 1960 of ICI
- Laura Fraser, actress
- Janice Hally, playwright and scriptwriter
- Gilbert Highet, Anthon Professor of the Latin Language and Literature from 1950 to 1972 at Columbia University, New York
- Prof E. A. J. Honigmann, Joseph Cowen Professor of English Literature from 1970 to 1989 at Newcastle University
- Gordon Jackson OBE, actor, noted for The Great Escape and The Professionals
- Prof Janusz Jankowski, doctor and academic
- Vera Kenmure, (1904-1973) Scottish minister
- George Leslie, politician
- Ian MacGregor, metallurgist and industrialist, antagonist in the UK miners' strike (1984-1985), chairman from 1983 to 1986 of the National Coal Board, and Chief Executive from 1980 to 1983 of the British Steel Corporation
- Harry McGowan, 1st Baron McGowan, chairman from 1930 to 1950 of ICI
- Alexander Mackendrick, film director
- Alistair MacLean, author
- Saul Metzstein, film director
- Edward Rosslyn Mitchell, Labour MP from 1924 to 1929 for Paisley
- Shuna Scott Sendall, opera singer
- Walter Owen, translator of S.American poetry (Argentine gaucho epic Martin Fierro, etc.)
- Sir Horace Phillips CMG, Ambassador to Turkey from 1973 to 1977, High Commissioner to Tanzania from 1968 to 1972, and Ambassador to Indonesia from 1966 to 1968
- Sir John Rennie CMG OBE, Governor of Mauritius (the last before its independence) from 1962 to 1968
- Anne Strachan Robertson, archaeologist and numismatist
- Ian Rodger, co-founder of Scottish Opera
- Prof Archie Roy, astronomer
- Robert Service, poet
- May Miles Thomas, film director
- Alexander Trocchi, novelist who wrote Young Adam
- Jean Turner, former Independent MSP from 2003 to 2007 for Strathkelvin and Bearsden
- Jonathan Watson, comedian. (Only an Excuse?)
- James Alfred Wight OBE, writer and veterinary surgeon from 1939 to 1990 (pen name: James Herriot)
- Sir Charles Wilson, first Vice-Chancellor from 1957 to 1961 of the University of Leicester, then Principal of the University of Glasgow from 1961 to 1976
- John Young, Conservative MSP from 1999 to 2003 for West of Scotland.
