= Hillhead Primary =

Hillhead Primary may refer to:

- A primary school in Wick, Caithness which merged with North Primary to make Noss Primary
- The original name of Hillhead High School
