= Gordon Craig =

Gordon Craig may refer to:

- Edward Gordon Craig (1872–1966), sometimes known as Gordon Craig, English modernist theatre practitioner
- Gordon A. Craig (1913–2005), Scottish-American historian of German history and of diplomatic history
- Gordon M. Craig (1929–1950), soldier in the United States Army and Medal of Honor recipient
- Gordon Craig (actor), British actor
- Gordon Craig (sports executive), Canadian sports executive
- Gordon Younger Craig (1925–2014), Scottish geologist, author and historian

== See also ==
- Craig Gordon (born 1982), Scottish footballer
- Gordon Craig Theatre, a theatre in Stevenage, Hertfordshire, England
