= Shuna Scott Sendall =

Shuna Scott Sendall (born 28 December 1975) is a Scottish dramatic soprano opera singer. Sendall originates from Irvine, North Ayrshire. She is best known as the 2010 winner of the BBC Radio 2 Kiri Prize competition.

== Biography ==
Shuna Scott Sendall was born in Irvine, North Ayrshire in Scotland the daughter of actress Anne Myatt and pianist Robert Sendall. Shuna attended Hillhead High School in Glasgow, where she was inspired by music teacher, Irene McLennan, to become involved in music as a career.

Shuna entered the Royal Scottish Academy of Music and Drama in 1993, where she studied under the tutelage of Patricia MacMahon and Jane Irwin until 2003 when she graduated from the Alexander Gibson Opera School with; DRSAMD (Performance) in Voice, CPGS - Concert Singer, MMus - Concert Singer, ACE, MMus – Opera and Mopera.

== The Kiri Prize ==
In January 2010, Dame Kiri Te Kanawa along with BBC Radio 2, launched an initiative find a gifted opera singer of the future. The initiative was the BBC Radio 2 Kiri Prize competition.

Following regional auditions of over 600 aspiring opera singers, 40 were invited to attend masterclasses in London with Dame Kiri, mezzo-soprano Anne Howells and conductor Robin Stapleton. From these masterclasses fifteen singers were selected to go through to the semi-finals which were broadcast on 5 consecutive weeks on BBC Radio 2's Friday Night Is Music Night. The semi-finalists were accompanied by the BBC Concert Orchestra, conducted by Martin Yates, Richard Balcombe and Roderick Dunk and their performances were judged by Dame Kiri, Anne Howells, Robin Stapleton and director John Cox.

Five singers went through to the final which was broadcast on Radio 2 on Friday 3 September 2010 where Shuna announced was the winner of the inaugural 2010 BBC Radio 2 Kiri Prize competition.

As part of her prize, Shuna performed "Dich, teure Halle" from Richard Wagner's Tannhäuser followed by "Tonight" from West Side Story with Dame Kiri and José Carreras at BBC Proms in the Park in Hyde Park, London on Saturday 11 September 2010 and was given the opportunity to attend a three-week residential course at the Solti Te Kanawa Accademia in Italy.

== Scholarships ==
Sendall is a Samling Scholar and one of Malcolm Martineau's Crear Scholars, and also attended the Lake Placid Institute International Vocal Seminar, working with Phyllis Bryn-Julson, Susan Webb, Ian Partridge, Patricia Macmahon and Jennifer Lane.

== Competitions ==
- 2011 ‘'Finalist'’ Bayreuth Bursary
- 2010 ‘'Winner'’ BBC Radio 2 Kiri Prize
- 2009 ‘'Finalist'’ Bayreuth Bursary
- 2004 ‘'Winner'’ Scottish Wagner Society Bayreuth Bursary
- 2003 ‘'Winner'’ Great Elm Vocal Awards
- 2002 ‘'Winner'’ Margaret Dick Award
- 2002 ‘'Winner'’ Ramsey A Calder Debussy Prize
- 2002 ‘'Winner'’ RSAMD Governors Recital Prize
- 2002 ‘'Winner'’ Bill Dewar Memorial Prize
- 2001 ‘'Winner'’ David Frame Memorial Prize
- 1998 ‘'Winner'’ Hugh S Roberton Scots Song Prize

== Personal life ==
Sendall married her childhood sweetheart, Iain Steel, at Inveroykel in a Humanist wedding ceremony in 2006.

== Notable appearances ==
"Let the bright Seraphim" from George Frideric Handel's oratorio Samson performed on 14 March 2011 for BBC Radio 3's Performance on 3: The Big Red Nose Show in aid of Comic Relief, and broadcast on 18 March 2011.

"Ebben? Ne andrò lontana" from Alfredo Catalani's opera La Wally and "Vissi d'arte" from Giacomo Puccini's Tosca, followed by "Have Yourself a Merry Little Christmas" performed with Bryn Terfel and Ella Taylor & Liam Jones (winners of Radio 2's 2010 Young Chorister Competition) performed live on 10 December 2010 for BBC Radio 2's Friday Night is Music Night.

In 2009, Shuna made a short film for STV entitled 'Happy Mondays'.
