= Hans-Beat Bürgi =

Swiss crystallographer

Hans-Beat Bürgi (born 20 January 1942, Münsterlingen) is a Swiss chemist and crystallographer. He was a professor for crystallography at the University of Bern from 1979 to 2007.

== Education and career ==
Bürgi attended primary and secondary school in Kreuzlingen. He went on to study chemistry at the ETH Zurich from which he graduated in 1965. He gained his doctoral degree at the ETH Zurich in 1969 under the supervision of Jack D. Dunitz. For his post-doctoral studies, he joined Lawrence Bartell at the University of Michigan. Upon his return to the ETH Zurich, he was an oberassistent and independent group leader from 1971 to 1979. In 1975, he completed his habilitation in general and structural chemistry.

At the University of Bern, Bürgi was professor for X-ray crystallography from 1979 until his official retirement in 2007. During this time and beyond, he was visiting professor at Princeton University, Australian National University, Technion, CALTECH, Tokyo Institute of Technology, University of California and the University of Western Australia. Since 2007, he is a permanent academic guest at the University of Zurich and organiser of the annual Zurich School of Crystallography.

== Research ==
At the ETH Zurich, Bürgi investigated chemical reaction paths with Jack Dunitz which led to the description concept of structure correlation. In organic chemistry, the Bürgi-Dunitz angle of nucleophilic attack at carbonyl groups is a widely used descriptor. It originated from collaborative work with Jean-Marie Lehn's group in Strasbourg.

Beyond accurate chemical crystallography and quantum crystallography, Bürgi's research focuses on dynamics in crystals as well as disorder and diffuse scattering. His interpretation of atomic and lattice vibrations in crystals always provides a link to chemistry. Bürgi and coworkers have created tools such as normal coordinate analysis to derive thermodynamic properties from X-ray diffraction data or PEANUT to display atomic displacement parameters and differences thereof.

He has published over 200 peer-reviewed articles and edited two books.

== Awards ==
Bürgi was awarded the Werner prize for young Swiss scientists by the Swiss Chemical Society in 1975. In 2022, the journal Acta Crystallographica B published a special issue on "Structure Correlation and Dynamics in Crystals", honouring Bürgi on the occasion of his 80th birthday.
