= Janusz Jankowski =

Polish-Scottish doctor

- Born: Glasgow, Scotland
- Education: University of Glasgow; University of Dundee; University of London; University of Oxford
- Known for: Research: Aspirin and Cancer; Management: Team Innovation; Education: Learning for Success; Pastoral: Evolutionary Mentoring
- Scientific career
- Fields: Clinical Trials; Gastroenterology; Genomics; Health promotion Education; Academic Administration

Janusz Jankowski is a doctor, educationalist and scientist of Scottish Polish origin. He is an expert in Social and Healthcare Policy, Academic Management and Global Research and Education Networks. He was formerly in previous senior management roles including Deputy Vice Chancellor of Research and Innovation, Pro Vice Chancellor Research, Vice Dean Research and the Sir James Black Professorship.

== Education and qualifications ==
Jankowski was educated at Hillhead High School, Glasgow a state co-educational school. He graduated from the University of Glasgow with a Baccalaureate in Medicine and Surgery (1983), the University of Dundee for a Doctorate of Medicine in Molecular Medicine (1996), a Doctorate of Philosophy in Molecular Genetics at the Royal Postgraduate Medical School, Imperial College at the University of London (1996) and at the University of Oxford gaining a Masters in Epidemiology and Clinical Trials (2009).

== Career ==
Jankowski has held Professorships at the University of Birmingham, University of Leicester Queen Mary University of London and has been a Visiting Professor and then the Sir James Black Senior Fellow at the University of Oxford. He has been the Associate Dean for Research at the Plymouth University Peninsula Schools of Medicine and Dentistry, and then as Pro Vice Chancellor Research, University of Central Lancashire and briefly on a part-time basis as Deputy Vice Chancellor for Research and Innovation at RCSI. He was also Consultant Gastroenterologist and Lead Mentor at the University Hospitals of Morecambe Bay NHS Foundation Trust. Over 20 years he has raised £120m+ in funds.

Jankowski had a senior management contribution to the Research Excellence Framework 2014 as the Clinical Medicine (UoA1) Lead for the Plymouth University Peninsula Schools of Medicine and Dentistry (PUPSMD).

== Clinician and teacher ==
Jankowski is an expert in reflux esophagitis, Barrett's esophagus, acute medicine and clinical trials as well as in cancer prevention and health promotion. As a clinician, Jankowski has created centres of excellence in medicine including the Digestive Disease Centre, University Hospitals of Leicester 2002–2012. He also set up Scotland's endoscopic surveillance service for Barrett's esophagus (ESBE) between 1988 and 1991 at Ninewells Hospital of Dundee.

Jankowski has published independent guidance for the National Health Service (NHS) and other international organisations using the Delphi systematic review platforms.

Jankowski was an editor of text books in gastroenterology and gastrointestinal cancer.

== Research and publications ==
Jankowski's group have undertaken several studies including the isolation of label retaining cells (putative stem cells) in the oesophagus, identification of the genomic factors associated with the premalignant condition Barrett's oesophagus. Jankowski has studied the use of aspirin and proton pump inhibitors in one of the largest randomized clinical trials to prevent cancer. Jankowski is a highly cited clinical academic with a h-index of over 65. He has over 200 publications of which 150 are peer reviewed papers including in Gastroenterology, The Lancet, Lancet Oncology, Nature, Nature Genetics, Nature Communications, New England Journal of Medicine and Proceedings of the National Academy of Sciences USA.

== Awards and honours ==
Jankowski has been awarded NHS Clinical Excellence Awards, the Sir Francis Avery Jones Award (British Society of Gastroenterology), the James Black Senior Fellowship (University of Oxford) and Lectureship (Brasenose College) and the Sir James Black Professorship (Plymouth University).

== Pro bono roles and directorships ==
Jankowski is a Tae Kwon Do 1st Dan black belt. He has been a parish councillor. Jankowski has been chair of the Acute and Chronic Diseases Panel of NICE, chair the GI Cancer Prevention Committee of the National Cancer Research Network and chair of the Education Committee of the British Society of Gastroenterology. Jankowski is currently chair of the European Union TRANSCAN-2 committee. Between July 2019 and June 2022 he was chair of the board of directors at University College of Osteopathy.
