= Walter Owen =

Scottish translator in Argentina

Walter Owen (1884–1953) was a Scottish translator transplanted to the Argentine Pampas. His career is an example of how the translator can open up a key aspect of a culture to readers in another language. Born in Glasgow, he spent much of his boyhood in Montevideo and as an adult returned to the River Plate area to work as a stockbroker. He thus had the opportunity to become bicultural as well as bilingual, and applied his skill to the translation into English of the major epic poems of the Southern part of South America. In so doing his objective was not simply aesthetic, but cultural and even political in terms of bringing closer together the English-speaking peoples and those of Latin America. As he put it, he hoped that his work "in its modest way may advance between peoples of different speech, the friendly interchange of thought and feeling which is the foundation of mutual esteem and the surest establishment for good fellowship. To have done so is the best reward of the translator."

== Translations ==
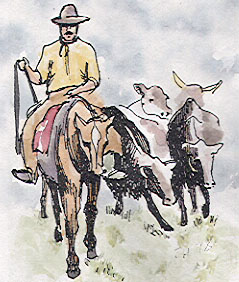
Gaucho

What Owen did was to "English" (his verb for translate) the principal epics of the part of Latin America he knew best: José Hernández's Martín Fierro, Alonso de Ercilla y Zúñiga's La Araucana, and Juan Zorrilla de San Martín's Tabaré, among others. In so doing he made available to the English-speaking world these neglected masterpieces of the Southern Cone. But as a translator he felt obliged to tell his readers (in extensive introductions or prefaces) how he crafted his works of translation. Thus, his legacy is a double one, of considerable value to both the reader of epic Latin American poetry as well as to the student of translation.

Owen avoided excessively literal translations, realizing that they would be of little interest to the reader trying to understand the gaucho or Araucanian culture. He was willing to sacrifice what he called "verbal accuracy" (i.e., word for word rendition) in order to achieve clarity and ease of style. His ultimate goal was what we would call "equivalent impact": "it must produce upon the consciousness of the reader an equivalent total impression to that produced by the original work upon readers in whose vernacular it was written." He reiterates this philosophy in his preface to the translation of La Araucana: "Translations of poems which adhere faithfully to the original text yield small pleasure to the reader, and what value they have is for the student of philology or semantics.... I consider the translation of poetry into poetry a liberal art and not an exact science .... To coin a portmanteau-term for this sort of translation, it might be called a psychological transvernacularisation."

== Texts ==
Here is his "transvernacularisation" of the opening stanza:

Aquí me pongo a cantar
Al compás de la vigüela
Que el hombre lo desvela,
Una pena estrordinaria
Como la ave solitaria
Con el cantar se consuela.

I sit me here to sing my song
To the beat of my old guitar
To the man whose life is a bitter cup,
With a song may yet his heart lift up,
As the lonely bird on a leafless tree
That sings 'neath the gloaming star.

In the preface to the translation of La Araucana, Owen invites the reader to share with him the intimate details of the process by which he takes the original poem of the Chilean conquest, makes a first rough semi-literal translation, and then plays with each line, word, and syllable to achieve the translation which most closely conveys the spirit, meaning and rhythm of the 16th Century Spanish original. This preface stands as one of the most complete explanations which a poet-translator has ever given of the intricacies of his work. He modestly says: "It will not be foreign to the purpose of these introductory remarks and will perhaps be of some entertainment to my readers if I illustrate the working of the system I have outlined, as applied to the opening stanza of Ercilla's epic. I will first give the original Spanish text of the stanza, then my first roughly literal translation, followed by a running commentary showing the development of the finished English version."

The Spanish original by Alonso de Ercilla, 1569:

No las damas, amor, no gentilezas,
De caballeros canto enamorados,
Ni las muestras, regalos y ternezas
De amorosos afectos y cuidados;
Mas el valor, los hechos, las proezas
De aquellos españoles esforzados,
Que a la cerviz de Arauco no domada
Pusieron duro yugo por la espada.

Owen's first "approximately literal translation" (early 1900s):

Not ladies, love, nor courtesies
Of amorous knights I sing,
Nor tokens, sweets, and favours
Of love's delights and cares;
But the valour, deeds, and exploits
Of those stalwart Spaniards,
That on Arauco's untamed neck
Placed by a sword a rigorous yoke.

Owen notes that this first cut carries the sense of the original, but that the "rhythm and ring and martial tramp of Ercilla are absent. The epic note is wanting; the bird of poetry has escaped our net of English words. No patching or mending of the new form will recapture the spirit of the original. What the translator has to do is to mentally digest this raw material, and once it is well assimilated, imagine himself Ercilla, seated quill in hand in old Madrid about the third quarter of the sixteenth century, with a clean sheet before him and his portfolio of manuscript notes at hand, ruminating the opening lines of his epic of the Arauco Wars."

Owen proceeds to do just that for six pages of his preface, showing the reader in great detail how he arrives at his final version:

Sing, Muse: but not of Venus and her chuck,
And amorous jousts in dainty lists of love,
Favours and forfeits won in Beauty's siege
By soft assaults of chamber gallantry;
But of the valiant deeds and worthy fame
Of those who far on surge-ensundered shores,
Bent the proud neck of Araucania's race
To Spain's stern yoke, by war's arbitrament.
