= Jack D. Dunitz =

British chemist (1923–2021)

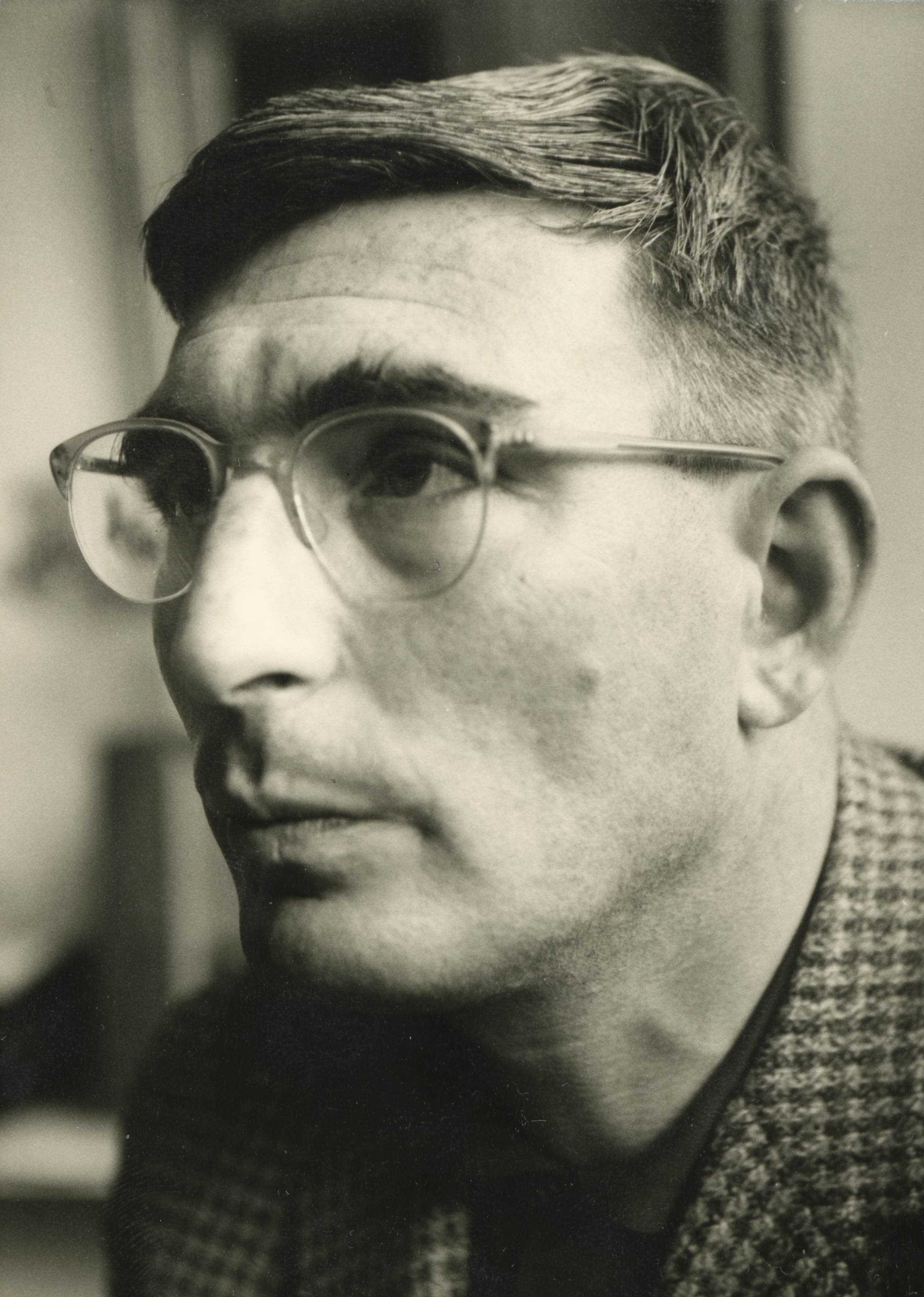
- Jack Dunitz, ca. 1960
- Born: Jack David Dunitz; 29 March 1923; Glasgow, Scotland, UK
- Died: 12 September 2021 (aged 98)
- Education: University of Glasgow
- Known for: Bürgi–Dunitz angle
- Spouse: Barbara Steuer
- Awards: Fellow of the Royal Society (1974); Gregori Aminoff Prize (1990)
- Scientific career
- Workplaces: ETH Zurich; University of Glasgow; University of Oxford; California Institute of Technology; US National Institute of Health; Royal Institution
- Thesis: The crystal and molecular structure of acetylene dicarboxylic acid dihydrate and of diacetylene dicarboxylic acid dihydrate (1946 submitted, accepted 1947)
- Doctoral advisor: J. Monteath Robertson
- Other academic advisors: Dorothy Hodgkin; Linus Pauling; Lawrence Bragg
- Doctoral students: Hans-Beat Bürgi
- Other notable students: Odile Eisenstein (postdoc); Keith Hodgson (postdoc)
- Website: www.chab.ethz.ch/en/the-department/people/emeriti/emeriti-homepages/jack-dunitz.html

Jack David Dunitz FRS (29 March 1923 – 12 September 2021) was a Scottish chemist and widely known chemical crystallographer. He was Professor of Chemical Crystallography at the ETH Zurich from 1957 until his official retirement in 1990. He held Visiting Professorships in the United States, Israel, Japan, Canada, Spain and the United Kingdom.

In 1953 he married Barbara Steuer and had two daughters Marguerite (1955) and Julia Gabrielle (1957).

== Education ==
Born in Glasgow, Dunitz was educated at Hillhead High School and Hutchesons' Grammar School. He went on to study at the University of Glasgow where he gained his Bachelor of Science degree and Doctor of Philosophy in 1947.

He held research fellowships at Oxford University (1946–1948, 1951–1953), the California Institute of Technology (1948–1951, 1953–1954), the US National Institutes of Health, Bethesda MD (1954–1955), and the Royal Institution, London (1956–1957).

== Research ==
Dunitz's main research direction involved the use of crystal structure analysis as tool for studying chemical problems. In his early pre-ETH period, his work included structure studies of cyclobutane, of ferrocene with the first description of its electronic structure in terms of orbital symmetry relationships. With Leslie Orgel he also explained distortions of certain spinel minerals from cubic symmetry in terms of the Jahn-Teller effect. In his later research, at the ETH Zurich and after, Dunitz worked in several areas of structural chemistry, including the conformation and reactivity of medium-ring cycloalkanes and lactams, ion-specificity of natural and synthetic ionophores, chemical reaction paths (see Bürgi-Dunitz angle), aspects of hydrogen bonding, molecular motions in solids, phase transformations and solid-state chemical reactions, electron density distributions in crystals, polymorphism, and intermolecular interactions in condensed phases. A few other publications on mathematical or theoretical topics may be of interest. Dunitz was also known for Dunitz's Rule: "Almost every scientific publication can be improved by cutting out the first sentence".

== Awards and honours ==
Dunitz was elected a Fellow of the Royal Society in 1974. Dunitz was a member of the German National Academy of Sciences Leopoldina since 1979, the Academia Europaea since 1989 and the European Academy of Sciences and Arts. He was also a foreign member of the Royal Netherlands Academy of Arts and Sciences since 1979 and an international member of the US National Academy of Sciences since 1988 and the American Philosophical Society since 1997. He was an international honorary member of the American Academy of Arts and Sciences since 1997. He was an Honorary Member of the Swiss Society of Crystallography, the Royal Society of Chemistry, the Swiss Chemical Society, and the British Crystallographic Association.

Dunitz was the recipient of the Paracelsus Prize of the Swiss Chemical Society (1986), the Gregori Aminoff Prize of the Royal Swedish Academy of Sciences (1990), the M.J. Buerger Award of the American Crystallographic Association (1991). He was the first recipient of the Havinga Medal in 1980, and also received the Bijvoet Medal at the University of Utrecht Bijvoet Center for Biomolecular Research in 1989.

Dunitz held honorary doctorates from the Technion (Israel Institute of Technology, Haifa) (1990), the Weizmann Institute of Science (1992) and the University of Glasgow (1999).

== Publications ==
Dunitz wrote more than 380 scientific papers and was the author of "X-Ray Analysis and the Structure of Organic Molecules" (Cornell University Press, 1979; Verlag Helvetica Chimica Acta, Basel, 1995), and "Reflections on Symmetry in Chemistry...and Elsewhere" (with Edgar Heilbronner, Verlag Helvetica Chimica Acta, Basel, 1993). He was Co-Editor (with J. A. Ibers) of "Perspectives in Structural Chemistry", John Wiley and Sons, Vols. 1–4 (1967– 1971) and (with H.-B. Bürgi) of the two-volume "Structure Correlation", Verlag Chemie, Weinheim, 1994.

== Death ==
Dunitz died on 12 September 2021, at the age of 98 after a short illness.
