= Gordon Younger Craig =

Scottish geologist, author, historian

Gordon Younger Craig FRSE, FGS
- Born: January 17, 1925; Milngavie, East Dunbartonshire, Scotland
- Died: October 3, 2014 (aged 89)
- Education: Hillhead High School, Bearsden Academy; Glasgow University, University of Edinburgh
- Known for: Geology of Scotland
- Awards: Medal, from the International Commission History of Geological Sciences
- Scientific career
- Fields: Geology
- Workplaces: University of Edinburgh, Glasgow University
- Thesis: A study of carboniferous palaeoecology (1951)

Gordon Younger Craig, FRSE, FGS (January 17, 1925 – October 3, 2014) was a Scottish geologist, author, historian, and a professor at the University of Edinburgh.

== Early life ==
He was born on 17 of January in Milngavie, East Dunbartonshire, Scotland, the only son of James and Emily Maud Craig. He attended Hillhead High School and Bearsden Academy, from where he progressed to Glasgow University to study Geology and where he was active in the university's Geological Society. His studies were interrupted by World War II, during which he served naval service. He graduated in 1946 with first class honours degree and was a demonstrator in the Glasgow department for the following year.

== Career ==
Upon recommendation by the renowned T. Neville George, in 1947 he was appointed Lecturer in Palaeontology at Edinburgh University, aged 22, and with the generous yearly salary of £500. Encouraged by Prof. Arthur Holmes, he progressed to become Reader in 1960, the first James Hutton Prof. of Geology in 1967, and Head of Department in 1981, a position which he held until 1984. He specialized in the emerging field of palaeoecology, studying the interaction between organisms and their living environment. One of his gifts was the aptitude to explain in plain language elaborate concepts in an accessible, condensed and concise way. He summed up his research on Lingula saying that "Lingula burrows vertically, anterior end uppermost and always did", and he commented that "It pays to have a snappy hack on your team. Matthew did the crucifixion in 2000 words and it has lasted 2000 years". His Geology of Scotland, defined as the bible of Scottish geological interpretation was published in four editions, and it has been treasured by students over the years in the same way they did Principles of Physical Geology by Arthur Holmes. When the Clerk family of Penicuik discovered some watercolour drawings illustrating geological scenes belonging to their ancestor Sir John Clerk of Eldin, one of James Hutton's companions, he was able to recognize at once their importance. They were the lost drawings meant to illustrate the second volume of Theory of the Earth by Hutton. In team with Charles Waterston (National Museum of Scotland) and the visiting professor Donald McIntyre from Pomona College, he researched the exact locations of these drawings, resulting in the magnificent publication of 1968 with exquisite facsimiles and editorial comments. He was involved in the International Commission on the History of Geological Sciences (INHIGEO) and became its president between 1984 and 1989, organizing international conferences throughout the whole world and promoting the role of Edinburgh as home to James Hutton, "father of modern Geology".

== Works ==
- The geology of Scotland
- A geological miscellany is an entertainment: a book of anecdotes, epigrams, documents, and cartoons, all illustrating (although not all intentionally) the humorous side of the profession.
- Ecology and palaeoecology of marine environments
- James Hutton: present and future
- James Hutton's Theory of the earth: the lost drawings
- James Hutton & Joseph Black: biographies
- The Geology of the Lothians and south east Scotland: an excursion guide. This is a guide for those wanting to explore the geology of the Southern Uplands. It suggests several excursions and provides background information.
- The 1785 abstract of James Hutton's theory of the earth
- This restless earth

== Awards ==
He was a Fellow of the Geological Society. In 1964, he was elected Fellow of the Royal Society of Edinburgh for the discipline Earth Sciences and Chemistry. In 1990, he received the Mary C Rabbit History of Geology award by the Geological Society of America 's History of Geology Division. This award is presented yearly to an individual for exceptional scholarly contributions of fundamental importance to our understanding of the geological sciences.

== Legacy ==
He is remembered as a man who gave his time to others. The School of Geosciences of the University of Edinburgh planned to honour his memory by awarding a Gordon Craig Memorial Scholarship to a student of Geology; a fitting tribute for someone who spent so much time and energy helping the next generation to succeed.
