= Siloxene =

- Wöhler siloxene structure

- Kautsky siloxene structure

Names
- Other names: Wöhler siloxene; Kautsky siloxene; polysilanol; silicon oxyhydride

Identifiers

Properties
Chemical formula	Si_{6}H_{3}(OH)_{3}
Appearance	Yellow-green solid

Structure
Crystal structure	Hexagonal (corrugated silicon sheets)

Related compounds
Related compounds	Silicene; Silicane; Graphane; Calcium disilicide
- Except where otherwise noted, data are given for materials in their standard state (at 25 °C [77 °F], 100 kPa). Infobox references

Siloxene is a nanostructured two-dimensional material derived from silicon. Together with silicene and silicane it constitutes the family of silicon nanosheets (Si-NSs), two-dimensional materials with diverse structures and functionalities. Its empirical formula is Si_{6}H_{3}(OH)_{3} (equivalently Si_{6}O_{3}H_{6}). Siloxene can be structurally derived from layered polysilyne by replacing one half of the hydrogen atoms with OH groups.

Two structural variants are recognised, named after their discoverers. Wöhler siloxene (sometimes called Weiss siloxene) consists of a corrugated hexagonal silicon sheet whose two faces are terminated by −H and −OH groups. No oxygen is incorporated into the Si framework. Kautsky siloxene consists of Si_{6}H_{6} rings connected by Si−O−Si bridges within the layer. The Wöhler form is metastable and slowly converts to the Kautsky form via hydrolysis, with oxygen inserting into Si−Si bonds.

Siloxene is a semiconductor with a band gap of about 2.5 eV and exhibits strong photoluminescence, making it a candidate material for optoelectronics, photocatalysis, supercapacitors, and alkali-ion battery anodes.

== History ==
Siloxene was discovered by Friedrich Wöhler in 1863 during his investigations of silicon compounds. Wöhler isolated the material from the reaction of calcium disilicide with hydrochloric acid as an unusually colored yellow substance, insoluble in water and most solvents, that bleached on exposure to sunlight. He called the yellow compound Silicon and the bleached product Leucon.

The same compound was prepared independently as early as 1900 by Charles Schenck Bradley (1853–1929), a one-time associate of Thomas Edison. Bradley erroneously concluded that the substance was the silicon analog of polyacetylene, (Si_{2}H_{2})_{x}, and so referred to it as silico-acetylene.

Beginning in 1921, Hans Kautsky re-examined the reaction of calcium disilicide with hydrochloric acid and showed that different reaction conditions produced different substances. A white, sometimes greenish, compound obtained from the reaction with alcoholic HCl was named Oxydisilin and, in 1924, renamed siloxene (from Cyclohexasilatrioxen). Kautsky proposed that the material consisted of six-membered silicon rings connected by oxygen bridges.

The structure of Wöhler's siloxene was determined by X-ray diffraction by Armin Weiss and co-workers in 1980, showing that the Wöhler preparation produces a different topology from the one Kautsky had proposed. Refined crystallographic studies followed in the 1990s. More recent work has examined siloxene's electronic and optical properties and explored applications in nanotechnology and electronics.

== Structure ==
Siloxene is a two-dimensional material. Sheets as thin as 0.7 nm (a single silicon layer) and 1.3 nm (two layers) have been prepared. Two distinct structural variants are known. The two variants interconvert: the Wöhler form is metastable, and slowly hydrolyses to the Kautsky form as oxygen inserts into Si−Si bonds.

=== Wöhler siloxene ===
Wöhler siloxene: a buckled silicon honeycomb sheet with −H and −OH terminations on opposite faces. Layer hydrogens not shown.

Interactive 3D ball-and-stick model of Wöhler siloxene built from the refined crystallographic coordinates of Dettlaff-Weglikowska et al. (1997) (space group P3m1, a = 380 pm, c = 604 pm).

Wöhler siloxene is a corrugated two-dimensional polymer of 1,3,5-trihydroxocyclohexasilane. Each silicon atom is fourfold-coordinated: 3 in-plane Si−Si bonds to neighbouring silicons and 1 out-of-plane Si−H or Si−OH bond. The Si sublattice is the same buckled honeycomb found in silicene and in the (111) layers of α-silicon. One face of each sheet is terminated by hydrogen atoms, and the other by hydroxyl groups, producing an electrostatic dipole that limits close interlayer stacking. Layer ordering is turbostratic.

The structure is trigonal in space group P3m1 (No. 156) with one formula unit Si_{6}H_{3}(OH)_{3} per cell distributed over three primitive cells.

Crystal data for Wöhler siloxene
Quantity	Value
a = b	380 pm (3.80 Å)
c	604 pm (6.04 Å)
Si−Si bond	234 pm
Si−H bond	154 pm
Si−O−H angle	115°

Note that the Si−Si bond length (234 pm) is nearly that of crystalline silicon (235.2 pm).

Dahn et al. (1993) reported nearly identical in-plane parameters (a = 3.83 Å, c = 5.90 Å) and confirmed the same topology by powder X-ray diffraction.

=== Kautsky siloxene ===
Kautsky siloxene: Si_{6} rings linked within the layer by Si−O−Si bridges. Layer hydrogens not shown.

Interactive 3D ball-and-stick model of Kautsky siloxene, using HSi(Si_{2}O) connectivity as measured experimentally by Kurmaev et al. (1999). Atom positions have not been measured experimentally, so standard bond geometries (Si−Si 234 pm, Si−O 160 pm, Si−O−Si 144°, Si−H 154 pm) are used.

The Kautsky variant has a different in-plane connectivity: discrete Si_{6} rings linked by Si−O−Si bridges, or one-dimensional Si−Si chains likewise joined by Si−O−Si bridges. Because the material does not form single crystals that can undergo conventional X-ray structure analysis, no refined atomic coordinates are available. The connectivities were measured using Si L_{2,3} X-ray emission spectroscopy (XES) and infrared spectroscopy.

Si−H environments in Kautsky siloxene
Connectivity	Fraction	Notes
HSi(Si_{2}O)	60.7%	dominant. Kautsky's 1924 Si_{6}-ring + Si−O−Si-bridge motif
HSiO_{3}	20.5%	non-ideal
HSi(SiO_{2})	18.8%	non-ideal

The overall oxygen content is ≈0.8 O per Si in Kautsky siloxene, compared with ≈0.5 O per Si in Wöhler siloxene. This matches the additional oxygen carried by the Si−O−Si bridges.

== Synthesis ==
=== Standard route ===
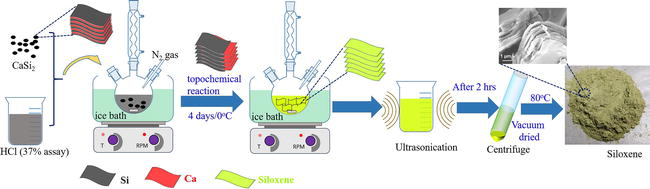
Schematic of the synthesis of siloxene from CaSi_{2}

Siloxene is most commonly synthesized from calcium disilicide (CaSi_{2}), a widely used precursor for silicon-based materials. The standard route de-intercalates Ca^{2+} from CaSi_{2} by a strong acid. The final structure depends on the acid concentration, temperature and reaction time.

- CaSi_{2} powder is mixed with concentrated hydrochloric acid under an inert atmosphere (nitrogen or argon) to prevent unintended oxidation.
- The mixture is stirred for 2 – 4 days at low temperature, typically close to 0 °C to remove (de-intercalate) Ca^{2+} ions from the CaSi_{2} layers. This produces silicon sheets terminated by −OH and −H groups, which is siloxene.

The overall reaction is:

3 CaSi_{2} + 6 HCl + 3 H_{2}O → Si_{6}H_{3}(OH)_{3} + 3 CaCl_{2} + 3 H_{2}

=== Characterization ===
Analysis of siloxene relies on several techniques that together probe its structure, chemical composition and physico-chemical properties.

X-ray diffraction (XRD) indexes siloxene to a hexagonal lattice. Reported lattice parameters vary across studies: some report a = 3.83 Å and c = 6.30 Å, while others give a = 3.83 Å and c = 5.90 Å. The discrepancies are attributed to differences in experimental conditions and to genuine structural variability of the material.

Fourier-transform infrared spectroscopy (FTIR) is used to identify surface functional groups, including hydroxyl (−OH), Si−H and siloxane (Si−O−Si). Scanning electron microscopy (SEM) and transmission electron microscopy (TEM) reveal the nanoscale morphology and sheet stacking, with TEM capable of resolving atomic-scale detail such as the corrugation imposed by the surface groups. Raman spectroscopy probes vibrational modes of the Si−H and Si−O−Si bonds and so yields precise information about the structure and state of siloxene. Photoluminescence spectroscopy (PL) is used to examine the optical properties of siloxene, in particular its capacity to emit light under photoexcitation. Thermogravimetric analysis (TGA) assesses thermal stability through mass loss as a function of temperature. Finally, X-ray photoelectron spectroscopy (XPS) determines the surface chemical composition and the oxidation states of the silicon and oxygen atoms, providing information on the nature of the chemical bonds present in the material.

== Properties ==
=== Optical and electronic ===
Siloxene is a semiconductor with a band gap of about 2.5 eV. Both structural forms are strongly luminescent: the Wöhler form phosphoresces in the green near a wavelength of 560 nm, while the Kautsky form emits in the blue near 500 nm. Dettlaff-Weglikowska et al. (1997) measured a room-temperature photoluminescence maximum at 2.30 eV with a FWHM of 300 meV and an external quantum efficiency of about 10%, with a sharp photoluminescence excitation peak at 2.6 eV attributed to a direct excitonic transition.

=== Chemical reactivity ===
Under aqueous basic conditions siloxene decomposes rapidly to silicic acid. Siloxene is a reducing agent and can reduce aldehydes and ketones to the corresponding alcohols.

In Kautsky siloxene the Si−H hydrogen atoms above and below the oxygen-linked silicon plane are the most reactive sites and can be replaced by other atoms or functional groups in substitution reactions. Stepwise bromination is possible. Iodination is incomplete because of the size of the iodine atoms. Reaction with chlorine is so vigorous that Si−Si bonds are also broken. Brominated siloxenes can be converted to further derivatives bearing organic ligands such as alkoxides, carboxylic acid groups, or alkylamines.

== Aspirational uses ==
Siloxene has attracted interest across a range of technological and medical fields.

=== Dopamine sensing ===
Siloxene-based electrodes have been investigated for selective electrochemical detection of dopamine, a neurotransmitter implicated in Parkinson's disease and schizophrenia. The two-dimensional morphology promotes electron transfer and reduces interference from other biomolecules, increasing sensor sensitivity and stability and supporting the development of devices for monitoring neurodegenerative diseases.

=== Photo-assisted Li−O_{2} batteries ===
The semiconducting character and light absorption of siloxene allow it to act as a bifunctional photocatalyst in light-assisted Li−O_{2} cells. Reported figures of merit include a reduced charge voltage of 1.90 V, an increased discharge voltage of 3.51 V, a round-trip energy efficiency of 185%, a capacity retention of 92% over 100 cycles, and a reversible capacity of 1170 mAh g^{−1} at 0.75 mA cm^{−2}. These characteristics make the material a promising candidate for energy storage, notably for integration with renewable-energy sources.

=== Wearable health sensors ===
Siloxene has been incorporated into flexible patches that monitor sweat electrolytes (Na^{+} and K^{+}) and cardiac activity (electrocardiogram). When combined with gold nanoparticles and graphene, siloxene improves measurement accuracy and supports non-invasive, continuous monitoring relevant to personalized medicine.

=== Supercapacitors ===
The two-dimensional architecture and oxygenated surface groups of siloxene yield high energy density and good cycling stability, making it an alternative electrode material to silicon and carbon for high-performance supercapacitors.

=== Optical limiting ===
Siloxene has also been studied for optical limiting, the attenuation of intense light flux passing through a material while low-intensity light passes mostly unattenuated. Its strong nonlinear absorption and semiconducting character give siloxene nanosheets considerable potential as broad-band optical-limiting materials.

Such nanosheets, embedded in hybrid gel glasses, reduce transmitted light intensity under intense laser illumination and so afford effective protection for optical sensors and other sensitive devices. The application is particularly relevant to defense, optronics and laser safety.

=== Photocatalysis ===
Its visible-light absorption and semiconducting character make siloxene an active photocatalyst. Reported reactions include photocatalytic reduction of chromate (Cr(VI)) in water, water splitting into hydrogen and oxygen, and reduction of carbon dioxide under sunlight.

=== Alkali-ion battery anodes ===
Siloxene can intercalate alkali metal cations (Li^{+}, Na^{+}, and K^{+}) and so has been investigated as an anode material for lithium-ion, sodium-ion, and potassium-ion batteries. Reversible specific capacities of 2300, 311, and 203 mAh g^{−1} have been measured for Li, Na, and K respectively.

== See also ==
- Calcium disilicide
- Graphane
- Silicon nanosheet
- Silicane
- Silicene
- Siloxane
