= Graphene chemistry =

Chemical properties of graphene

Graphene is the only form of carbon (or solid material) in which every atom is available for chemical reaction from two sides (due to the 2D structure). Atoms at the edges of a graphene sheet have special chemical reactivity. Graphene has the highest ratio of edge atoms of any allotrope. Defects within a sheet increase its chemical reactivity. The onset temperature of reaction between the basal plane of single-layer graphene and oxygen gas is below 260 °C (530 K). Graphene combusts at 350 °C (620 K). Graphene is commonly modified with oxygen- and nitrogen-containing functional groups and analyzed by infrared spectroscopy and X-ray photoelectron spectroscopy. However, determination of structures of graphene with oxygen- and nitrogen- functional groups requires the structures to be well controlled.

Contrary to the ideal 2D structure of graphene, chemical applications of graphene need either structural or chemical irregularities, as perfectly flat graphene is chemically inert. In other words, the definition of an ideal graphene is different in chemistry and physics.

Graphene placed on a soda-lime glass (SLG) substrate under ambient conditions exhibited spontaneous n-doping (1.33 × 10^{13} e/cm^{2}) via surface-transfer. On p-type copper indium gallium diselenide (CIGS) semiconductor itself deposited on SLG n-doping reached 2.11 × 10^{13} e/cm^{2}.

== Oxide ==
Using paper-making techniques on dispersed, oxidized and chemically processed graphite in water, monolayer flakes form a single sheet and create strong bonds. These sheets, called graphene oxide paper, have a measured tensile modulus of 32 GPa. The chemical property of graphite oxide is related to the functional groups attached to graphene sheets. These can change the polymerization pathway and similar chemical processes. Graphene oxide flakes in polymers display enhanced photo-conducting properties. Graphene is normally hydrophobic and impermeable to all gases and liquids (vacuum-tight). However, when formed into graphene oxide-based capillary membrane, both liquid water and water vapor flow through as quickly as if the membrane was not present.

== Chemical modification ==
Photograph of single-layer graphene oxide undergoing high temperature chemical treatment, resulting in sheet folding and loss of carboxylic functionality, or through room temperature carbodiimide treatment, collapsing into star-like clusters.

Soluble fragments of graphene can be prepared in the laboratory through chemical modification of graphite. First, microcrystalline graphite is treated with an acidic mixture of sulfuric acid and nitric acid. A series of oxidation and exfoliation steps produce small graphene plates with carboxyl groups at their edges. These are converted to acid chloride groups by treatment with thionyl chloride; next, they are converted to the corresponding graphene amide via treatment with octadecylamine. The resulting material (circular graphene layers of 5.3 angstrom thickness) is soluble in tetrahydrofuran, tetrachloromethane and dichloroethane.

Refluxing single-layer graphene oxide (SLGO) in solvents leads to size reduction and folding of individual sheets as well as loss of carboxylic group functionality by up to 20%, indicating thermal instabilities of SLGO sheets dependent on their preparation methodology. When using thionyl chloride, acyl chloride groups result, which can then form aliphatic and aromatic amides with a reactivity conversion of around 70–80%.

Boehm titration results for various chemical reactions of single-layer graphene oxide, which reveal reactivity of the carboxylic groups and the resultant stability of the SLGO sheets after treatment.

Hydrazine reflux is commonly used for reducing SLGO to SLG(R), but titrations show that only around 20–30% of the carboxylic groups are lost, leaving a significant number available for chemical attachment. Analysis of such SLG(R) reveals that the system is unstable. Using a room temperature stirring with HCl (< 1.0 M) leads to around 60% loss of COOH functionality. Room temperature treatment of SLGO with carbodiimides leads to the collapse of the individual sheets into star-like clusters that exhibited poor subsequent reactivity with amines (c. 3–5% conversion of the intermediate to the final amide). It is apparent that conventional chemical treatment of carboxylic groups on SLGO generates morphological changes of individual sheets that leads to a reduction in chemical reactivity, which may potentially limit their use in composite synthesis. Therefore, chemical reactions types have been explored. SLGO has also been grafted with polyallylamine, cross-linked through epoxy groups. When filtered into graphene oxide paper, these composites exhibit increased stiffness and strength relative to unmodified graphene oxide paper.

Full hydrogenation from both sides of graphene sheet results in graphane, but partial hydrogenation leads to hydrogenated graphene. Similarly, both-side fluorination of graphene (or chemical and mechanical exfoliation of graphite fluoride) leads to fluorographene (graphene fluoride), while partial fluorination (generally halogenation) provides fluorinated (halogenated) graphene.

== Graphene ligand/ Graphene complex ==
Graphene can be a ligand to form a graphene complex by introducing functional groups and coordinating metal ions. Structures of graphene ligands are similar to e.g. metal-porphyrin complex, metal-phthalocyanine complex and metal-phenanthroline complex. Copper and nickel ions can be coordinated with graphene ligands.
