= Lithium silicate =

Lithium silicate may refer to:

- Lithium metasilicate, an inorganic chemical compound with the formula Li_{2}SiO_{3}, used in calibrating thermocouples
- Lithium orthosilicate, an inorganic chemical compound with the formula Li_{4}SiO_{4}, used as a carbon dioxide scrubber
