= Graphite-like zinc oxide nanostructure =

Type of nanostructure

Most of the synthesized Zinc oxide (ZnO) nanostructures in different geometric configurations such as nanowires, nanorods, nanobelts and nanosheets are usually in the wurtzite crystal structure. However, it was found from density functional theory calculations that for ultra-thin films of ZnO, the graphite-like structure was energetically more favourable as compared to the wurtzite structure. The stability of this phase transformation of wurtzite lattice to graphite-like structure of the ZnO film is only limited to the thickness of about several Zn-O layers and was subsequently verified by experiment. Similar phase transition was also observed in ZnO nanowire when it was subjected to uniaxial tensile loading. However, with the use of the first-principles all electron full-potential method, it was observed that the wurtzite to graphite-like phase transformation for ultra-thin ZnO films will not occur in the presence of a significant amount of oxygen vacancies (V_{o}) at the Zn-terminated (0001) surface of the thin film. The absence of the structural phase transformation was explained in terms of the Coulomb attraction at the surfaces. The graphitic ZnO thin films are structurally similar to the multilayer of graphite and are expected to have interesting mechanical and electronic properties for potential nanoscale applications. In addition, density functional theory calculations and experimental observations also indicate that the concentration of the V_{o} is the highest near the surfaces as compared to the inner parts of the nanostructures. This is due to the lower V_{o} defect formation energies in the interior of the nanostructures as compared to their surfaces.
