= NGC 7796 =

Elliptical galaxy in the constellation of Phoenix

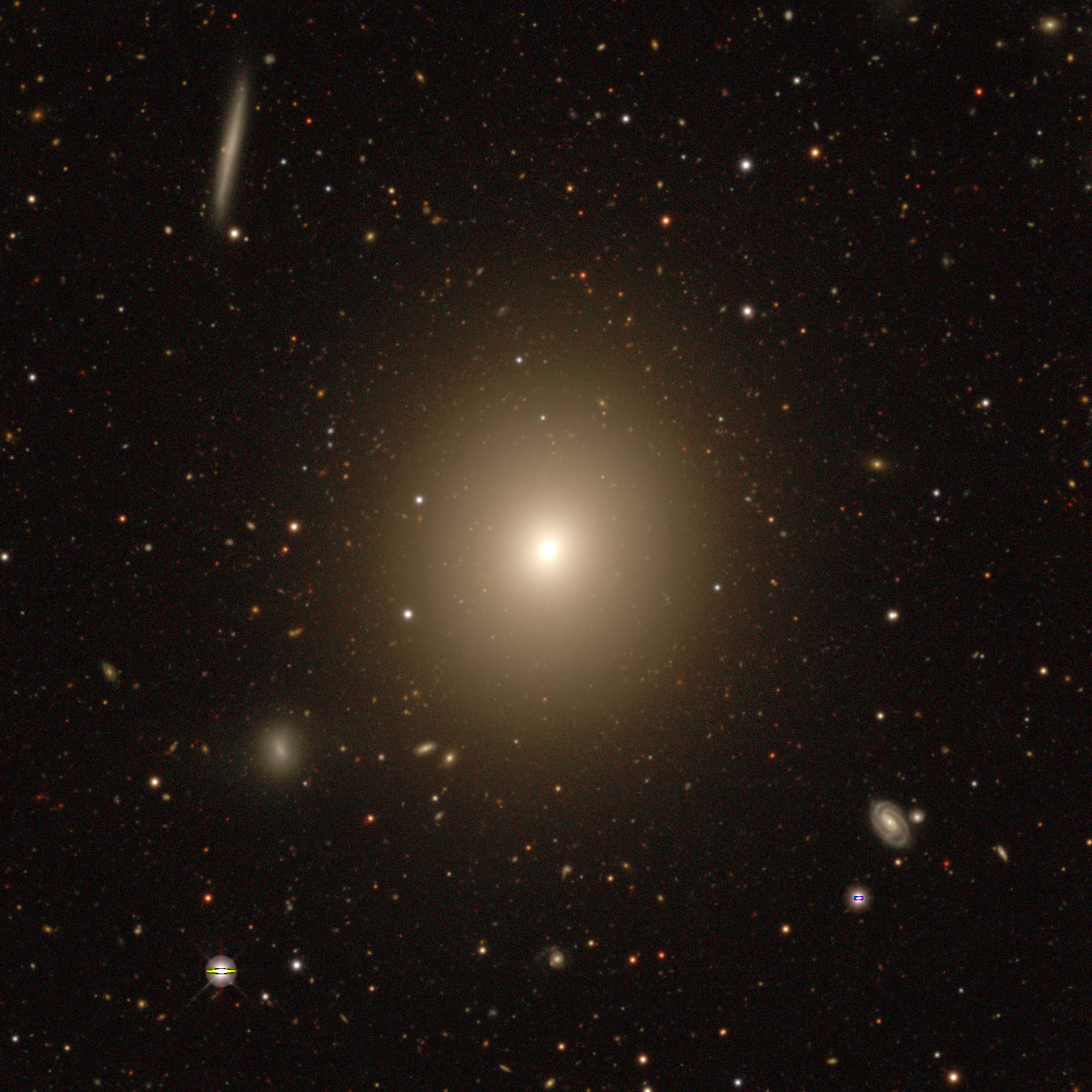
- Image of NGC 7796

Observation data (J2000 epoch)
- Constellation: Phoenix
- Right ascension: 23^{h} 58^{m} 59.8011^{s}
- Declination: −55° 27′ 29.841″
- Redshift: 0.010974 ± 0.00000007
- Heliocentric radial velocity: 3290 ± 2 km/s
- Distance: 150 mly
- Apparent magnitude (V): 11.3

Characteristics
- Type: cD cD / Sy1
- Size: ~217,100 ly (66.55 kpc) (estimated)

Other designations
- WISEA J235859.80-552729.8, PGC 73126

NGC 7796 (also known as PGC 73126) is an elliptical galaxy located around 150 million light years away from Earth in the constellation of Phoenix. It is a large, box-shaped galaxy with an estimated size of about 888,000 light years. It is an old galaxy that is isolated from other galaxies but does have a companion dwarf galaxy. It was discovered on Sep 11, 1836 by John Herschel.

While morphologically classified as a normal elliptical galaxy, NGC 7796 hosts an active galactic nucleus (AGN) and is formally classified as a Seyfert 1 (Sy1) galaxy in spectroscopic catalogs and the SIMBAD database.

== Characteristics ==
It is a large and ancient galaxy with an estimated size of approximately 880,000 light years (272.27 parsecs). The morphology of the galaxy shows no abnormalities, lack by structures such as shells or ripples which are usually seen in isolated galaxies its type. The main body of the galaxy is depleted in metals making it have a low-metallicity. Star formation seemed to have started in the galactic nucleus around 12 to 15 billion years ago occurring on relatively short-timescales of 0.1 to 1 billion years. Then when many of these stars undergo type-ll supernovae, the galaxies enriched in elements such as Oxygen (O), Neon (Ne), Magnesium (Mg), Silicon (Si) (O–Si) and Iron (Fe). These supernovas heat up the gas around them and produces a galactic wind which generates significant motions.

There seems to be a lack of a very massive dark matter halo. However there may not be full absence and there may be some instances of dark matter. The halo that it does have is cool and compact.

=== Globular clusters ===
The system of globular clusters (GCs) around NGC 7796 is rich and contains around 2000 members which makes the galaxy not have as many as large elliptical galaxies of similar mass located in galaxy clusters but much more than similar galaxies that are isolated.

=== Companion galaxy ===
It is an isolated elliptical (IE) galaxy being isolated from other galaxies for hundreds of parsecs and in a low-density environment. However it does have a dwarf galaxy companion named NGC 7796-1. It has a tidal tail which seems to be common for isolated giant elliptical galaxies. The tidal tail show than it is interacting with NGC 7796. The companion may be the left over remains of a larger population, most of which would form into NGC 7796. It may have been instead a product of a galactic merger which evidence can be seen with its multiple galactic nuclei labeled A, B and C. These nuclei are bluer than the bulk of the galaxies stellar population indicating that these nuclei have younger ages. Nuclei B and C have an oxygen abundance close to the solar abundance.

== See also ==
- List of NGC objects (7001-7840)
- List of NGC objects
