= Chlorographene =

For inorganic compounds of carbon, chlorographene is fully chlorinated graphene with the chemical formula of (CCl)_{n}. Upon reaction with chlorine, graphene's sp^{2} planar lattice structure is transformed to sp^{3} hybridized buckled structure, this structure is similar to hydrogenated graphene (graphane) and fluorinated graphene (fluorographene).

== Early derivatives ==
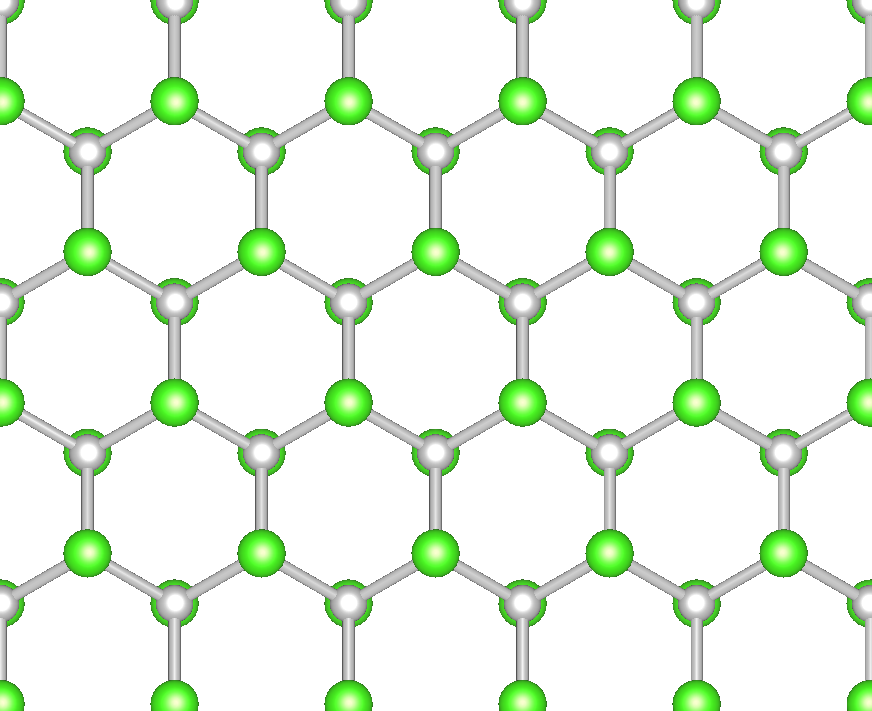
The atomic structure of chlorographene.(Top view)

Although graphene is one of the most mechanically strong material having a wide range of extraordinary properties, practical device applications are limited by its metallic behavior and sensitivity to surface adsorbates. Efforts to synthesize chemically modified graphene composites with tailored electronic, optical, and chemical properties have presented new directions in graphene research. In particular, band gap engineering of graphene through chemical modification, such as oxygenation, hydrogenation and fluorination is appealing for electronic applications, since the scalable fabrication of graphene-based devices without disturbing the strong honeycomb lattice has become possible. However, due to the complex atomic structure of graphene oxides (GOs) and thermal instabilities of hydrogenated graphenes (CHs) even at low temperatures, search for the novel graphene-based materials is still continuing. Easy synthesis, high-quality insulating behavior and extraordinary mechanical strength of fluorographene (CF) have inspired intense research on other halogen decorated graphene derivatives.

== Synthesis ==
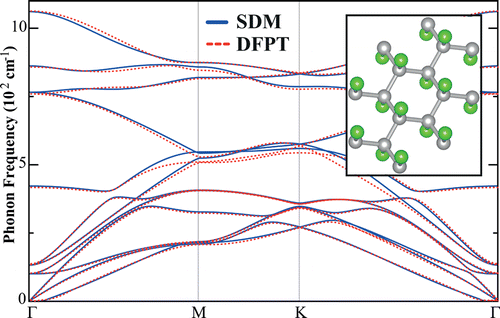
Phonon Dispersion of the stable chair form of chlorographene

In addition to three known derivatives of graphene: graphene oxide, graphane and fluorographene, the successful synthesis of chlorinated graphene (chlorographene) was also achieved very recently. It is experimentally demonstrated that nondestructive and patternable conversion of graphene is possible by using various photochemical chlorination techniques. Theoretical investigations have revealed that the covalently bonded chair conformation of chlorographene (formulated as CCl) is found to be stable even at room temperature.

== Electronic properties ==
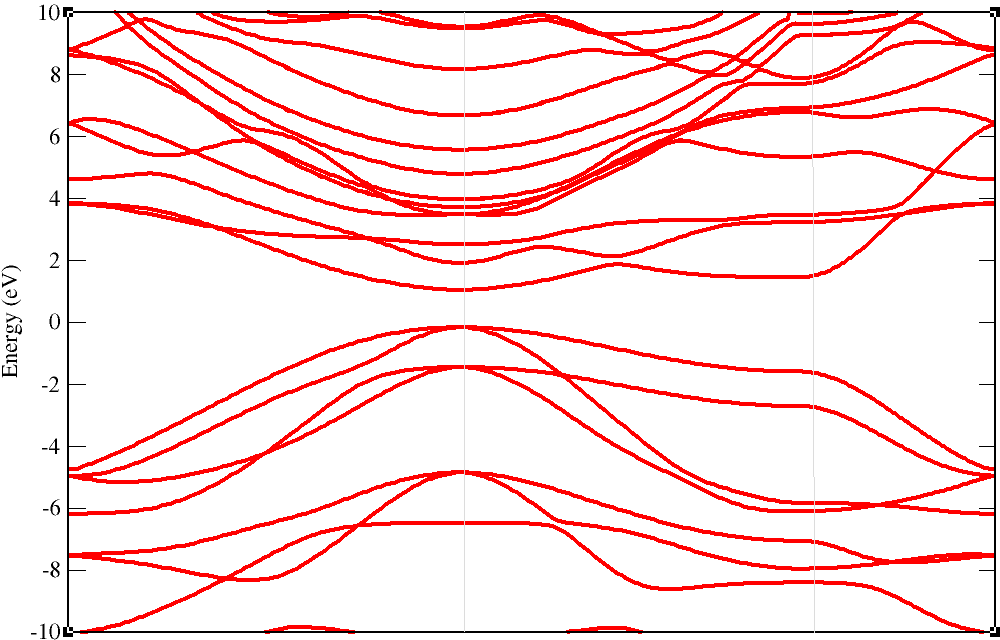
Electronic band structure of chlorographene through the high symmetry points K-Gamma-M-K

Chlorographene is a nonmagnetic semiconductor with 1.2 eV direct band gap. Top of the valence band and bottom of the conduction band locate at gamma point (center of the Brillouin zone). Its electronic properties are more sensitive to applied strain than other graphene derivatives such as graphane and fluorographene.
