= Cooperative segmental mobility =

Cooperative segmental mobility is a phenomenon associated with mobility of tens to a few hundreds of repeat units of a polymer and is important in defining the transition between “glassy” and “rubbery” state of the polymer. This cooperative segmental mobility is closely related to the dynamics of the polymer near its glass transition temperature. In the glassy state, the relaxation process of a polymer chain is a cooperative phenomenon and the molecular motion depends to some degree on that of its neighbors.

== Background ==
F. Bueche was the first scientist to come up with the theory of segmental mobility of polymers near their glass transition temperature. He presented two methods to describe the mobility of polymer segments near T_{g}. Based on his excluded volume calculations, he concluded that any factor which increases the volume disturbed by a rotating segment of a polymer chain or which increases the density of the polymer will in turn increase T_{g}. Hence, increasing chain stiffness and addition of bulky, but stiff, chain side groups will increase T_{g}.

Later in 1965, Adam and Gibbs formulated the temperature dependence of cooperative relaxation properties in glass forming liquids. It was theorized that the local relaxation of polymer chains occurs in cooperative rearranging regions (CRR) where there is a collective motion of small polymer segments (hence the name segmental mobility). They correlated the size of these cooperative regions to the configurational entropy of the system. Typically the size of the CRR near T_{g} ranges between 1 and 4 nm.

Alexandrov Solunov formulated an equation to determine the average size of the cooperative rearranging regions which corresponds to the average number of structural units that relax together to cross from one configuration to another. He concluded that the glass transition temperature is proportional to the activation energy of these CRRs.

Following these work, a lot of researchers started investigating ways to quantify this cooperative segmental mobility which in turn affects the relaxation time of polymers.

== Theory ==
The concept of cooperative segmental mobility comes from the free volume quantification. With the reduction in temperature, the free volume occupied by the polymer segments is reduced. Due to this loss in free volume, cooperative segmental dynamics is significantly slowed near the glass transition temperature and is practically arrested at glass transition temperature. In other words, the molecular rearrangements are frozen.

This cooperative segmental mobility has a huge effect on the glass transition temperature of the polymer. As F. Bueche concluded in his work, increasing the chain stiffness and/or adding a bulky stiff side group significantly increases T_{g}. For example, the glass transition temperature of poly(dimethyl siloxane) is -125 °C whereas that of poly(isobutylene) is -75 °C due to stiffer backbone chain. Similarly, T_{g} for polypropylene is -20 °C whereas for polystyrene it is 95 °C due to the presence of bulkier side group.

The glass transition temperature in thin films is also affected by this phenomenon. Exposure to the free surface enhances the cooperative segmental mobility which reduces T_{g}. This can be detrimental in applications like nano electronics, where polymer thin films are used.

Experimentally, single-molecule fluorescence microscopy can be used to detect the motion of single molecules, and thus reflect the segmental mobility in their neighboring domains. From simulation perspective, the probability of segment movement (PSM) is a parameter used to directly measure the segmental mobility. PSM is defined as the probability of movement of each segment either by jumping into its neighboring empty sites or partial sliding diffusion. The value of 〈PSM〉 decreases initially with the decrease of temperature, and then levels off at low temperatures, indicating that the chain segments enter the completely frozen state.
