= Silanone =

Silicon analogue of a ketone

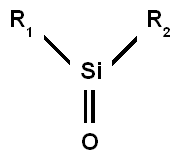
The general structure of a silanone

A silanone in chemistry is the silicon analogue of a ketone. The general description for this class of organic compounds is R_{1}R_{2}Si=O, with silicon connected to a terminal oxygen atom via a double bond and also with two organic residues (R). Silanones are extremely reactive and until 2013 were only detected by argon matrix isolation or in the gas phase but not isolated. A synthesis of a stable silanone was reported in 2014. Silanones are of some interest to academic research, with their reactivity being of some relevance to the double bond rule.

Silanones are unstable and favor oligomerisation to siloxanes. The reason for this instability is the weak pi bond with a small HOMO–LUMO gap caused by an unfavorable overlap between the p-orbitals of silicon and oxygen. A second reason for the observed instability is the strongly polarized silicon–oxygen bond, Si^{δ+}–O^{δ−}.

== History ==
The first to postulate a silanone were Kipping & Lloyd in 1901, but their products were in fact siloxanes. It was not until 2014 that a stable silanone was reported. In this compound, silicon is bonded to a SIDipp (1,3-bis(2,6-iPr_{2}-C_{6}H_{3})imidazolidin-2-ylidene) group and a (Cp^{*})Cr(CO)_{3} group. Its stability is owed to the direct coordination of silicon to chromium and to steric shielding. The reported Si=O bond length is 1.526 Å, in line with expectations. It has been described as a cationic metallosilanone.

Other strategies have recently been used to stabilise silanones, for example coordination to Lewis acids or bases and steric shielding.
