= Tetrakis(trifluoropropyl)tetramethylcyclotetrasiloxane =

Identifiers
CAS Number	429-67-4
3D model (JSmol)	Interactive image
ChemSpider	61251
ECHA InfoCard	100.006.420
EC Number	207-060-9
PubChem CID	67934
UNII	6UZH4CP48X
CompTox Dashboard (EPA)	DTXSID7059985
- InChI: InChI=1S/C16H28F12O4Si4/c1-33(9-5-13(17,18)19)29-34(2,10-6-14(20,21)22)31-36(4,12-8-16(26,27)28)32-35(3,30-33)11-7-15(23,24)25/h5-12H2,1-4H3 Key: XOVNCWWRDSAYNE-UHFFFAOYSA-N
- SMILES: C[Si]1(O[Si](O[Si](O[Si](O1)(C)CCC(F)(F)F)(C)CCC(F)(F)F)(C)CCC(F)(F)F)CCC(F)(F)F

Properties
Chemical formula	C₁₆H₂₈F₁₂O₄Si₄
Molar mass	624.71

Hazards
- GHS labelling
Pictograms	(GHS07: Exclamation mark) (GHS09: Environmental hazard)
Signal word	Warning
Hazard statements	H302, H312, H315, H319, H332, H335, H410, H413
Precautionary statements	P261, P264, P264+P265, P270, P271, P273, P280, P301+P317, P302+P352, P304+P340, P305+P351+P338, P317, P319, P321, P330, P332+P317, P337+P317, P362+P364, P391, P403+P233, P405, P501
- Except where otherwise noted, data are given for materials in their standard state (at 25 °C [77 °F], 100 kPa). Infobox references

Tetrakis(trifluoropropyl)tetramethylcyclotetrasiloxane (D_{4}F) is a chemical substance. It is a derivative of octamethylcyclotetrasiloxane (D_{4}), but also belongs to the class of per- and polyfluoroalkyl substances (PFASs).

It occurs in four diastereomeric forms:

cis-D_{4}F

trans-D_{4}F (2R,4r,6S,8s)

trans-D_{4}F (2R,4R,6S,8S)

trans-D_{4}F (2r,4r,6r,8r)

D_{4}F is formed as a reaction by-product in the synthesis of polymethyltrifluoropropylsiloxane (PMTFPS). The starting material is dichloromethyl(3,3,3-trifluoropropyl)silane and tris(trifluoropropyl)trimethylcyclotrisiloxane (D_{3}F) is an intermediate.

Reaction of dichloromethyl(3,3,3-trifluoropropyl)silane via D_{3}F to form PMTFPS, with D_{4}F as a reaction by-product

It has been detected in wastewater, sewage sludge as well as in biosolid-amended soils.
