= Tris(trifluoropropyl)trimethylcyclotrisiloxane =

Identifiers
CAS Number	2374-14-3
3D model (JSmol)	Interactive image
ChemSpider	67943
ECHA InfoCard	100.017.414
EC Number	219-154-7
PubChem CID	75410
UNII	MV7XKZ9FYQ
CompTox Dashboard (EPA)	DTXSID7051892
- InChI: InChI=1S/C12H21F9O3Si3/c1-25(7-4-10(13,14)15)22-26(2,8-5-11(16,17)18)24-27(3,23-25)9-6-12(19,20)21/h4-9H2,1-3H3 Key: URZHQOCYXDNFGN-UHFFFAOYSA-N
- SMILES: C[Si]1(O[Si](O[Si](O1)(C)CCC(F)(F)F)(C)CCC(F)(F)F)CCC(F)(F)F

Properties
Chemical formula	C_{12}H_{21}F_{9}O_{3}Si_{3}
Molar mass	468.538 g·mol^{−1}

Hazards
- GHS labelling
Pictograms	(GHS07: Exclamation mark) (GHS08: Health hazard)
Signal word	Danger
Hazard statements	H315, H319, H361, H372, H373
Precautionary statements	P203, P260, P264, P264+P265, P270, P280, P302+P352, P305+P351+P338, P318, P319, P321, P332+P317, P337+P317, P362+P364, P405, P501
- Except where otherwise noted, data are given for materials in their standard state (at 25 °C [77 °F], 100 kPa). Infobox references

Tris(trifluoropropyl)trimethylcyclotrisiloxane (D_{3}F) is a chemical substance. It is a derivative of hexamethylcyclotrisiloxane (D_{3}), but also belongs to the class of per- and polyfluoroalkyl substances (PFASs).

It occurs in two diastereomeric forms:

cis-D_{3}F

trans-D_{3}F

D_{3}F is used to produce polymethyltrifluoropropylsiloxane (PMTFPS). The starting material is dichloromethyl(3,3,3-trifluoropropyl)silane. Tetrakis(trifluoropropyl)tetramethylcyclotetrasiloxane (D_{4}F) is produced as a reaction by-product.

Reaction of dichloromethyl(3,3,3-trifluoropropyl)silane via D_{3}F to form PMTFPS, with D_{4}F as a reaction by-product

It has been detected in wastewater, sewage sludge as well as in biosolid-amended soils.
