= Tetrakis(trimethylsilyloxy)silane =

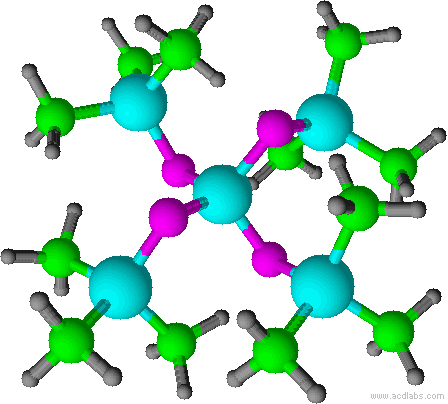

Names
- Preferred IUPAC name Tetrakis(trimethylsilyl) silicate

Identifiers
CAS Number	3555-47-3
3D model (JSmol)	Interactive image
Abbreviations	TTMS
ChemSpider	18019
ECHA InfoCard	100.020.558
EC Number	222-613-4
PubChem CID	19086
UNII	55L9T9A11I
CompTox Dashboard (EPA)	DTXSID9042463
- InChI: InChI=1S/C12H36O4Si5/c1-17(2,3)13-21(14-18(4,5)6,15-19(7,8)9)16-20(10,11)12/h1-12H3 Key: VNRWTCZXQWOWIG-UHFFFAOYSA-N
- SMILES: C[Si](C)(C)O[Si](O[Si](C)(C)C)(O[Si](C)(C)C)O[Si](C)(C)C

Properties
Chemical formula	C_{12}H_{36}O_{4}Si_{5}
Molar mass	384.841 g·mol^{−1}
Appearance	Colourless liquid
Density	0.87 g cm^{−3}
Melting point	−60 °C (−76 °F; 213 K)
Boiling point	103–106 °C (217–223 °F; 376–379 K)
Vapor pressure	8.96 Pa (25°C)
Refractive index (n_{D})	1.389

Hazards
- GHS labelling
Pictograms	(GHS07: Exclamation mark)
Signal word	Warning
Hazard statements	H315, H319, H335, H413
Precautionary statements	P261, P264, P271, P273, P280, P302+P352, P304+P340, P305+P351+P338, P312, P321, P332+P313, P337+P313, P362, P403+P233, P405, P501
Flash point	80 °C (176 °F; 353 K)

Related compounds
Related compounds	Hexamethyldisiloxane Octamethylcyclotetrasiloxane
- Except where otherwise noted, data are given for materials in their standard state (at 25 °C [77 °F], 100 kPa). verify (what is ?) Infobox references

Tetrakis(trimethylsilyloxy)silane (TTMS) is an organosilicon compound with the formula Si[OSi(CH_{3})_{3}]_{4}. This colourless liquid is used as a reagent in organic synthesis.

== Application ==
TTMS can be used for thin film coating with a nanostructured silicon dioxide prepared by plasma-enhanced chemical vapor deposition (PECVD) at atmospheric pressure.

== See also ==
- Hexamethylcyclotrisiloxane
- Polymethylhydrosiloxane
