= Siloxane =

Organic functional group (Si–O–Si)

Polydimethylsiloxane is a prevalent siloxane.

In organosilicon chemistry, a siloxane is an organic compound containing a functional group of two silicon atoms bound to an oxygen atom: Si−O−Si. The parent siloxanes include the oligomeric and polymeric hydrides with the formulae H[OSiH_{2}]_{n}OH and [OSiH_{2}]_{n}. Siloxanes also include branched compounds, the defining feature of which is that each pair of silicon centres is separated by one oxygen atom. The siloxane functional group forms the backbone of silicones [−R_{2}Si−O−SiR_{2}−]_{n}, the premier example of which is polydimethylsiloxane (PDMS). The functional group R_{3}SiO− (where the three Rs may be different) is called siloxy. Siloxanes are manmade and have many commercial and industrial applications because of the compounds' hydrophobicity, low thermal conductivity, and high flexibility.

== Structure ==
Siloxanes generally adopt structures expected for linked tetrahedral ("sp^{3}-like") centers. The Si−O bond length is 1.64 Å (vs Si−C distance of 1.92 Å) and the Si−O−Si angle is rather open at 142.5°. By contrast, the C−O distance in a typical dialkyl ether is much shorter at 1.414(2) Å with a more acute C−O−C angle of 111°. It can be appreciated that the siloxanes would have low barriers for rotation about the Si−O bonds as a consequence of low steric hindrance. This geometric consideration is the basis of the useful properties of some siloxane-containing materials, such as their low glass transition temperatures.

== Synthesis ==
Dimethyldichlorosilane (Si(CH_{3})_{2}Cl_{2}) is a key precursor to cyclic (D_{3}, D_{4}, etc.) and linear siloxanes.

The main route to siloxane functional group is by hydrolysis of silicon chlorides:

2 R_{3}Si−Cl + H_{2}O → R_{3}Si−O−SiR_{3} + 2 HCl

The reaction proceeds via the initial formation of silanols (R_{3}Si−OH):

R_{3}Si−Cl + H_{2}O → R_{3}Si−OH + HCl

The siloxane bond can then form via a silanol + silanol pathway or a silanol + chlorosilane pathway:

2 R_{3}Si−OH → R_{3}Si−O−SiR_{3} + H_{2}O
R_{3}Si−OH + R_{3}Si−Cl → R_{3}Si−O−SiR_{3} + HCl

Hydrolysis of a silyldichloride can afford linear or cyclic products. Linear products are terminated with silanol groups:

n R_{2}Si(OH)_{2} → H(R_{2}SiO)_{n}OH + (n - 1) H_{2}O

Cyclic products have no silanol termini:

n R_{2}Si(OH)_{2} → (R_{2}SiO)_{n} + n H_{2}O

The linear polymer, polydimethylsiloxane (PDMS), is of commercial significance. It is produced using dimethylsilicon dichloride.

Starting from trisilanols, cages are possible, such as the species with the formula (RSi)_{n}O_{3n/2} with cubic (n = 8) and hexagonal prismatic (n = 12) structures. The cubic cages are cubane-type clusters, with silicon centers at the corners of a cube oxygen centres spanning each of the twelve edges.

== Reactions ==
Oxidation of organosilicon compounds, including siloxanes, gives silicon dioxide. This conversion is illustrated by the combustion of hexamethylcyclotrisiloxane:

((CH_{3})_{2}SiO)_{3} + 12 O_{2} → 3 SiO_{2} + 6 CO_{2} + 9 H_{2}O

Strong bases degrade the siloxane group, often affording siloxide salts:

((CH_{3})_{3}Si)_{2}O + 2 NaOH → 2 (CH_{3})_{3}SiONa + H_{2}O

This reaction proceeds by production of silanols. Similar reactions are used industrially to convert cyclic siloxanes to linear polymers.

== Uses ==
Polysiloxanes (silicones), upon combustion in an inert atmosphere, generally undergo pyrolysis to form silicon oxycarbide or silicon carbide (SiC). By exploiting this reaction, polysiloxanes have been used as preceramic polymers in various processes including additive manufacturing. Polyvinyl siloxane (vinyl polysiloxane) is used to make dental impressions and industrial impressions. The use of a poly-siloxane precursor in polymer-derived ceramics allows the formation of ceramic bodies with complex shapes, although the significant shrinkage in pyrolysis needs to be taken into account.

Trisiloxanes may be used as diffusion pump fluid.

== Cyclomethicones ==
Cyclomethicones are a group of methyl siloxanes, a class of liquid silicones (cyclic polydimethylsiloxane polymers) that possess the characteristics of low viscosity and high volatility as well as being skin emollients and in certain circumstances useful cleaning solvents. Unlike dimethicones, which are linear siloxanes that do not evaporate, cyclomethicones are cyclic: both groups consist of a backbone of [(CH_{3})_{2}SiO]_{n}. They are used in many cosmetic products including deodorants and antiperspirants which need to coat the skin but not remain tacky afterward. Dow is a major producer of cyclomethicones.

Cyclomethicones, like all siloxanes, degrade by hydrolysis, producing silanols. These silanols are produced at such low levels that they do not interfere with hydrolytic enzymes. Even though some cyclomethicones structurally resemble crown ethers, they bind metal ions only weakly.

== Nomenclature ==
Decamethylcyclopentasiloxane, or D_{5}, a cyclic siloxane

The word siloxane is derived from the words silicon, oxygen, and alkane. In some cases, siloxane materials are composed of several different types of siloxane groups; these are labeled according to the number of Si−O bonds:

M-units: (CH_{3})_{3}SiO_{0.5}
D-units: (CH_{3})_{2}SiO
T-units: (CH_{3})SiO_{1.5}

Cyclic siloxanes (cyclomethicones)	CAS	Linear siloxanes	CAS
		L_{2}, MM: hexamethyldisiloxane	107-46-0
D_{3}: hexamethylcyclotrisiloxane	541-05-9	L_{3}, MDM: octamethyltrisiloxane	107-51-7
D_{4}: octamethylcyclotetrasiloxane	556-67-2	L_{4}, MD_{2}M: decamethyltetrasiloxane	141-62-8
D_{5}: decamethylcyclopentasiloxane	541-02-6	L_{5}, MD_{3}M: dodecamethylpentasiloxane	141-63-9
D_{6}: dodecamethylcyclohexasiloxane	540-97-6	L_{6}, MD_{4}M: tetradecamethylhexasiloxane	107-52-8

== Safety and environmental considerations ==
Because silicones are heavily used in biomedical and cosmetic applications, their toxicology has been intensively examined. "The inertness of silicones toward warmblooded animals has been demonstrated in a number of tests." With an LD_{50} in rats of >50 g/kg, they are virtually nontoxic.

Findings about bioaccumulation have been largely based on laboratory studies. Field studies of bioaccumulation have not reached consensus. "Even if the concentrations of siloxanes we have found in fish are high compared to concentrations of classical contaminants like PCBs, several other studies in the Oslo Fjord in Norway, Lake Pepin in the US, and Lake Erie in Canada have shown concentrations of siloxanes decrease at higher range in the food chain. This finding raises questions about which factors influence the bioaccumulation potential of siloxanes."

Cyclomethicones are ubiquitous because they are widely used in biomedical and cosmetic applications. They can be found at high levels in American cities. They can be toxic to aquatic animals in concentrations often found in the environment. The cyclomethicones octamethylcyclotetrasiloxane (D_{4}) and decamethylcyclopentasiloxane (D_{5}) are bioaccumulative in some aquatic organisms, according to one report.

In the European Union, D_{4}, D_{5}, D_{6} and octamethyltrisiloxane have been deemed hazardous as per the REACH regulation. They were characterized as substances of very high concern (SVHC) in 2024 due to their persistent, bioaccumulative, and toxic properties and were subsequently added to the REACH Candidate List in 2025. Canada regulates D_{4} under a pollution prevention plan. A scientific review in Canada in 2011 concluded that "Siloxane D5 does not pose a danger to the environment."

== See also ==
- Calcium disilicide
- Graphane
- Nanosheet
- Silicane
- Silicene
- Siloxene
