= Silicon–oxygen bond =

Covalent chemical bond between silicon and oxygen atoms

A silicon–oxygen bond (Si−O bond) is a chemical bond between silicon and oxygen atoms that can be found in many inorganic and organic compounds. In a silicon–oxygen bond, electrons are shared unequally between the two atoms, with oxygen taking the larger share due to its greater electronegativity. This polarisation means Si–O bonds show characteristics of both covalent and ionic bonds. Compounds containing silicon–oxygen bonds include materials of major geological and industrial significance such as silica, silicate minerals and silicone polymers like polydimethylsiloxane.

== Bond polarity, length and strength ==
On the Pauling electronegativity scale, silicon has an electronegativity of 1.90 and oxygen 3.44. The electronegativity difference between the elements is therefore 1.54. Because of this moderately large difference in electronegativities, the Si−O bond is polar but not fully ionic. Carbon has an electronegativity of 2.55 so carbon–oxygen bonds have an electronegativity difference of 0.89 and are less polar than silicon–oxygen bonds. Silicon–oxygen bonds are therefore covalent and polar, with a partial positive charge on silicon and a partial negative charge on oxygen: Si^{δ+}—O^{δ−}.

Silicon–oxygen single bonds are longer (1.6 vs 1.4 Å) but stronger (452 vs. about 360 kJ mol^{−1}) than carbon–oxygen single bonds. However, silicon–oxygen double bonds are weaker than carbon–oxygen double bonds (590 vs. 715 kJ mol^{−1}) due to a better overlap of p orbitals forming a stronger pi bond in the latter. This is an example of the double bond rule. For these reasons, carbon dioxide is a molecular gas containing two C=O double bonds per carbon atom whereas silicon dioxide is a polymeric solid containing four Si–O single bonds per silicon atom; molecular SiO_{2} containing two Si=O double bonds would polymerise. Other compounds containing Si=O double bonds are normally very reactive and unstable with respect to polymerisation or oligomerization. Silanones oligomerise to siloxanes unless they are stabilised, for example by coordination to a metal centre, coordination to Lewis acids or bases, or by steric shielding.

Comparison of C–O and Si–O bonds
| Bond | Carbon–oxygen | Silicon–oxygen |
| E | C | Si |
| Pauling electronegativity of E | 2.55 | 1.90 |
| Pauling electronegativity difference between E and O | 0.89 | 1.54 |
| H_{3}E–O–EH_{3} Bond angle / ° | 111 | 142 |
| Typical sp^{3} E–O single bond length / Å | 1.43 | 1.63 |
| Typical sp^{2} E–O single bond length / Å | 1.34 | |
| Typical sp^{2} E=O double bond length / Å | 1.21 | 1.52 |
| Typical sp E=O double bond length / Å | 1.16 | 1.48 |
| Typical E–O single bond strength / kJ mol^{−1} | ~360 | 452 |
| Typical E=O double bond strength / kJ mol^{−1} | 715 | 590 |

== Bond angles ==
Disiloxane groups, Si–O–Si, tend to have larger bond angles than their carbon counterparts, C–O–C. The Si–O–Si angle ranges from about 130–180°, whereas the C–O–C angle in ethers is typically 107–113°. Si–O–C groups are intermediate, tending to have bond angles smaller than Si–O–Si but larger than C–O–C. The main reasons are hyperconjugation (donation from an oxygen p orbital to an Si–R σ* sigma antibonding molecular orbital, for example) and ionic effects (such as electrostatic repulsion between the two neighbouring partially positive silicon atoms). Recent calculations suggest π backbonding from an oxygen 2p orbital to a silicon 3d orbital makes only a minor contribution to bonding as the Si 3d orbital is too high in energy.

The Si–O–Si angle is 144° in α-quartz, 155° in β-quartz, 147° in α-cristobalite and (153±20)° in vitreous silica. It is 180° in coesite (another polymorph of SiO_{2}), in Ph_{3}Si–O–SiPh_{3}, and in the [O_{3}Si–O–SiO_{3}]^{6−} ion in thortveitite, Sc_{2}Si_{2}O_{7}. It increases progressively from 133° to 180° in Ln_{2}Si_{2}O_{7} as the size and coordination number of the lanthanide decreases from neodymium to lutetium. It is 150° in hemimorphite and 134° in lithium metasilicate and sodium metasilicate.

== Coordination number ==
In silicate minerals, silicon often forms single bonds to four oxygen atoms in a tetrahedral molecular geometry, forming a silicon–oxygen tetrahedron. At high pressures, silicon can increase its coordination number to six, as in stishovite.

== See also ==
- Organosilicon compound
- Carbon–hydrogen bond
- Carbon–carbon bond
- Carbon–fluorine bond
- Bonding in solids
