= Disiloxane =

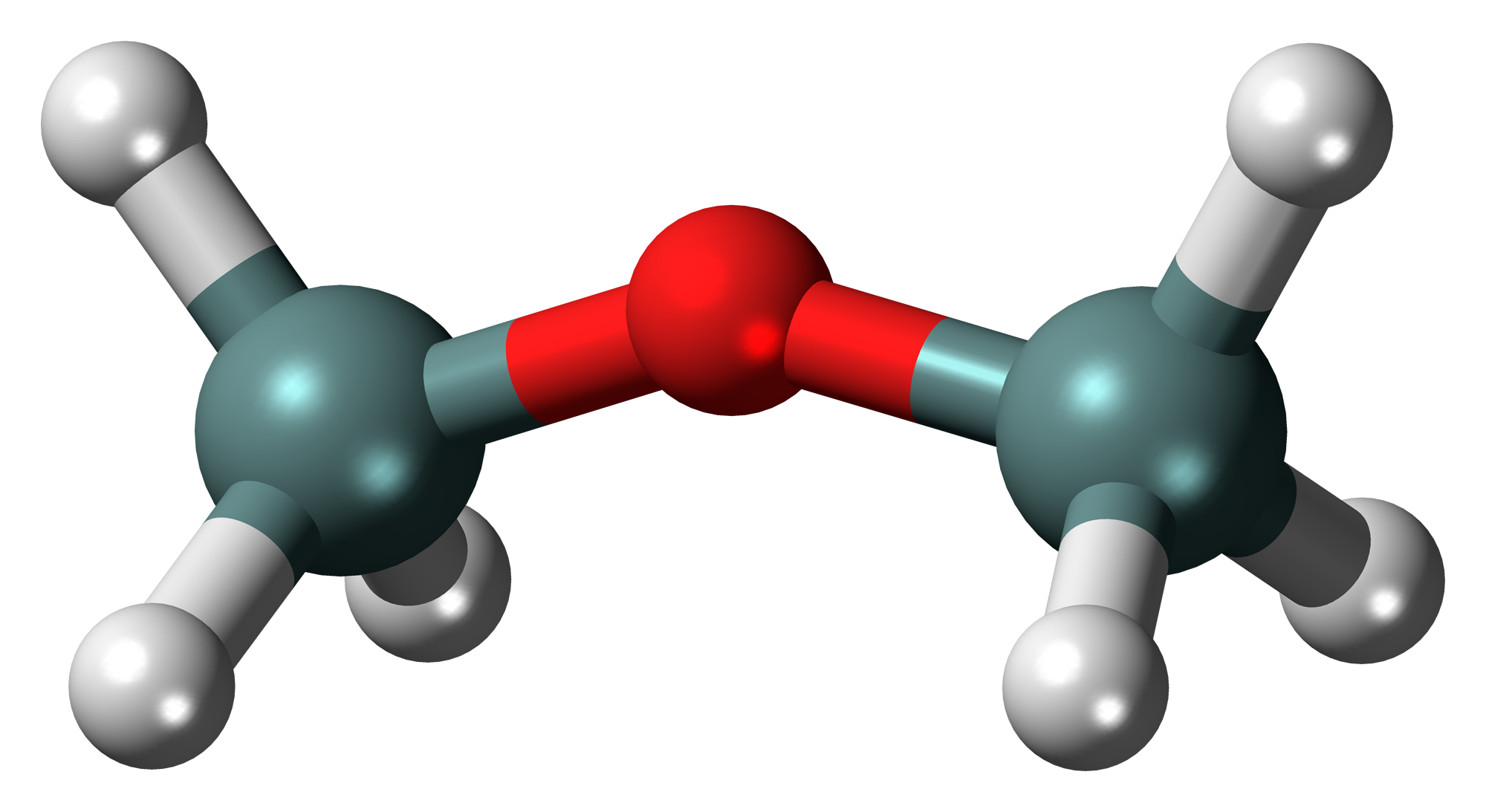

Names
- IUPAC name Disiloxane
- Other names: Disilyl ether; Disilyl oxide; Hexahydrodisiloxane; Perhydrodisiloxane; Silyl ether; Silyl oxide

Identifiers
| CAS Number | 13597-73-4 |
| 3D model (JSmol) | Interactive image |
| Abbreviations | DS; DSE; DSO |
| ChEBI | CHEBI:48141 |
| ChemSpider | 109921 |
| Gmelin Reference | 1206 |
| MeSH | Disiloxane |
| PubChem CID | 123318 |
| CompTox Dashboard (EPA) | DTXSID70929193 |
- InChI: InChI=1S/H6OSi2/c2-1-3/h2-3H3 Key: KPUWHANPEXNPJT-UHFFFAOYSA-N
- SMILES: [SiH3]O[SiH3]

Properties
| Chemical formula | H_{6}OSi_{2} |
| Molar mass | 78.217 g·mol^{−1} |
| Appearance | Colorless gas |
| Boiling point | −15.2 °C (4.6 °F; 257.9 K) |
| Dipole moment | 0.24 D |

Structure
| Crystal structure | Orthorhombic |
| Space group | Pmm2 |
| Molecular shape | Bent |

Hazards
| NFPA 704 (fire diamond) | 2 4 1 |

Related compounds
| Related compounds | Dimethyl ether; Disilane; Silane; Silanol; Trisilane |
- Except where otherwise noted, data are given for materials in their standard state (at 25 °C [77 °F], 100 kPa). Infobox references

Disiloxane has the chemical formula Si_{2}H_{6}O. It is the simplest known siloxane with hydrogen only R groups. The molecule contains six equivalent Si−H bonds and two equivalent Si−O bonds. Disiloxane exists as a colorless, pungent gas under standard conditions. However, it is generally safe for human use as evidenced in its widespread use in cosmetics. It is also commonly known as disilyl ether, disilyl oxide, and perhydrodisiloxane.

== Structure ==
Disiloxane has a simple structure that consists of a siloxane bond (Si−O−Si) and hydrogen R groups.

The structure of disiloxane has been studied by a variety of spectroscopic methods such as electron diffraction, X-ray crystallography, dipole moment, and nuclear magnetic resonance spectroscopy. Due to their unusual nature, the Si−O−Si bond angles are commonly studied. These bonds typically exhibit angles that are larger than average, around 130 to 160 degrees, and larger bond lengths are not uncommon. For example, in the solid state at a temperature of 108 K, disiloxane itself has an Si−O−Si bond angle of 142°. In contrast, the C−O−C bond angle in the carbon analogue of disiloxane, dimethyl ether, is 111°.

The unusual bond angle in disiloxane has been attributed primarily to negative hyperconjugation between oxygen p orbitals and silicon–carbon σ* antibonding orbitals, p(O) → σ*(Si􏰉−R), a form of π backbonding. A secondary and much smaller contribution to the silicon–oxygen bond in disiloxanes involves π backbonding from oxygen 2p orbitals to silicon 3d orbitals, p(O) → d(Si). Because of this interaction, the Si−O bonds can exhibit some partial double bond behavior and the oxygen atoms are much less basic than in the carbon analogue, dimethyl ether.

In addition to studies of bond angles, vibrational analyses have also been done to determine the symmetry elements of disiloxane. IR and Raman spectroscopy have been used to propose a point group of D_{3d}.

While disiloxane itself has a bent molecular geometry at oxygen, the related compound hexaphenyldisiloxane, Ph_{3}Si−O−SiPh_{3}, has an Si−O−Si angle of 180°.

== Synthesis ==
Synthesis of disiloxane is typically done by taking a hydrosilane species with a substituent leaving group and reacting it with water to produce silanol. The silanol is then reacted with itself to produce the final disiloxane through dehydrative coupling. This is shown in the reactions below:

H_{3}SiX + H_{2}O → H_{3}SiOH + HX (first step)

2 H_{3}SiOH → H_{3}SiOSiH_{3} + H_{2}O (second step)

Other methods of synthesis involve the use of gold on carbon as a catalyst for the reaction carried out in water as well as InBr_{3}- catalyzed oxidation of hydrosilanes.

== Uses ==
Disiloxanes can be used as sealants for construction, paints, inks, and coatings, cosmetics, mechanical fluids, textile applications, and paper coatings.

Commercial use of disiloxane is common in cosmetics. It is commonly found in products such as sunscreen, moisturizer, hair spray, eye liner, body spray, nail polish, makeup remover, and conditioner. The properties that disiloxane exhibits in these products include fast drying, oil reducing, moisturizing, skin conditioning, and defoaming agent (preventing formation of foam).

Disiloxanes have been approved as teen and child safe. Siloxanes of many kinds are found to be extremely safe for topical use but can be dangerous if ingested in large quantities.

== Variations ==
The term disiloxane is commonly used to refer to structures that exhibit much more complex R groups than hydrogen. The most common molecule that makes use of this naming is hexamethyldisiloxane which replaces the hydrogen groups with methyl groups. Other common variations include the use of disiloxanes as bridges and spacers in larger compounds such as polymers.

== General references ==
1. Sawama, Y.; Masuda, M.; Yasukawa, N.; Nakatani, R.; Nishimura, S.; Shibata, K.; Yamada, T.; Monguchi, Y.; Suzuka, H.; Takagi, Y.; Sajiki, H. The Journal of Organic Chemistry2016, 81, 4190–4195.
2. Disiloxane https://pubchem.ncbi.nlm.nih.gov/compound/Disiloxane (accessed Mar 23, 2018).
3. Lassen, C.; Hansen, C.; Mikkelsen, S.; Maag, J. Siloxanes-Consumption, Toxicity, and Alternatives; Danish Ministry of the Environment, 2018.
4. Lord, R.; Robinson, D.; Schumb, W. Journal of the American Chemical Society 1956, 78, 1327–1332.
5. Varma, R.; MacDiarmid, A.; Miller, J. Inorganic Chemistry 1964, 3, 1754–1757.
6. BOCK, H.; MOLLERE, P.; BECKER, G.; FRITZ, G. Chemischer Informationsdienst 1974, 5, 113–125.
7. Disiloxane | H6OSi2 | ChemSpider http://www.chemspider.com/Chemical-Structure.109921.html (accessed Mar 23, 2018).
