= Hexamethyldisiloxane =

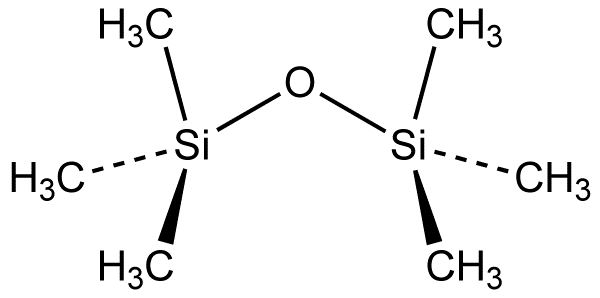

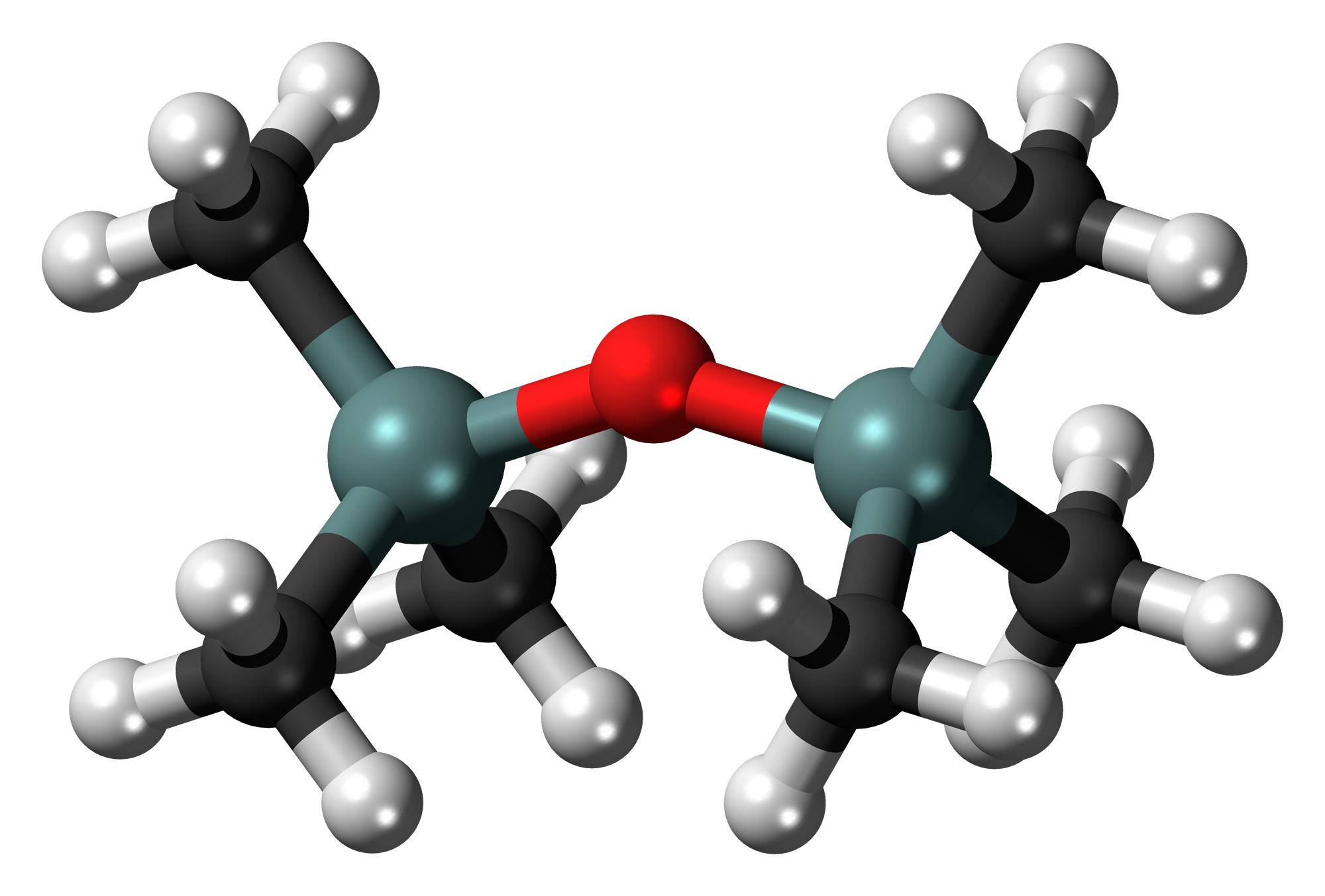

Names
- Preferred IUPAC name Hexamethyldisiloxane
- Other names: Bis(trimethylsilyl) ether; Bis(trimethylsilyl) oxide

Identifiers
CAS Number	107-46-0
3D model (JSmol)	Interactive image
Abbreviations	HMDSO, (TMS)_{2}O
Beilstein Reference	1736258
ChEBI	CHEBI:78002
ChemSpider	23150
ECHA InfoCard	100.003.176
EC Number	203-492-7
MeSH	Hexamethyldisiloxane
PubChem CID	24764
RTECS number	JM9237000
UNII	D7M4659BPU
UN number	1993
CompTox Dashboard (EPA)	DTXSID4026769
- InChI: InChI=1S/C6H18OSi2/c1-8(2,3)7-9(4,5)6/h1-6H3 Key: UQEAIHBTYFGYIE-UHFFFAOYSA-N; InChI=1/C6H18OSi2/c1-8(2,3)7-9(4,5)6/h1-6H3 Key: UQEAIHBTYFGYIE-UHFFFAOYAL
- SMILES: O([Si](C)(C)C)[Si](C)(C)C

Properties
Chemical formula	C_{6}H_{18}OSi_{2}
Molar mass	162.379 g·mol^{−1}
Appearance	Colourless liquid
Density	0.764 g·cm^{−3}
Melting point	−59 °C (−74 °F; 214 K)
Boiling point	100 to 101 °C (212 to 214 °F; 373 to 374 K)
Solubility in water	930.7±33.7 ppb (23 °C)
Vapor pressure	43 hPa (20 °C)
Refractive index (n_{D})	1.377

Hazards
- Occupational safety and health (OHS/OSH)
Main hazards	Highly flammable liquid and vapour; Causes serious eye irritation
- GHS labelling
Pictograms	(GHS02: Flammable) (GHS09: Environmental hazard)
Signal word	Danger
Hazard statements	H225, H410
Precautionary statements	P210, P233, P240, P273, P403+P235
NFPA 704 (fire diamond)	1 4 0
Flash point	−1(1) °C

Related compounds
Related compounds	Disiloxane; Tetramethylsilane; Dimethyl ether; Bis(trimethylsilyl)amine; Tetrakis(trimethylsilyloxy)silane
- Except where otherwise noted, data are given for materials in their standard state (at 25 °C [77 °F], 100 kPa). verify (what is ?) Infobox references

Hexamethyldisiloxane (HMDSO or MM) is an organosilicon compound with the formula O[Si(CH_{3})_{3}]_{2}, often abbreviated O[SiMe_{3}]_{2}. This volatile colourless liquid is used as a solvent and as a reagent in organic synthesis. It is prepared by the hydrolysis of trimethylsilyl chloride. The molecule is the prototypical disiloxane and resembles a subunit of polydimethylsiloxane.

== Synthesis and reactions ==
Hexamethyldisiloxane can be produced by the addition of trimethylsilyl chloride to purified water:

2 Me_{3}SiCl + H_{2}O → 2 HCl + O[SiMe_{3}]_{2}

It also results from the hydrolysis of silyl ethers and other silyl-protected functional groups. HMDSO can be converted to trimethylsilyl chloride by treatment with dimethyldichlorosilane:

O[SiMe_{3}]_{2} + Me_{2}SiCl_{2} → "Me_{2}SiO" + 2 Me_{3}SiCl

Hexamethyldisiloxane is mainly used as source of the trimethylsilyl functional group (-Si(CH_{3})_{3}) in organic synthesis. For example, in the presence of acid catalyst, it converts alcohols and carboxylic acids into the silyl ethers and silyl esters, respectively.

It reacts with rhenium(VII) oxide to give a siloxide:

Re_{2}O_{7} + O[SiMe_{3}]_{2} → 2 O_{3}ReOSiMe_{3}

HMDSO is a precursor to trimethylsilyl iodide:

O[SiMe_{3}]_{2} + AlI_{3} → "AlI(O)" + 2 Me_{3}SiI

== Solvent-related uses ==
HMDSO is an effective solvent for thiations using phosphorus pentasulfide.

It is used occasionally as an internal standard for ^{1}H NMR spectroscopy. It is more easily handled since it is less volatile than the usual standard tetramethylsilane but still displays only a singlet near 0 ppm.

HMDSO has even poorer solvating power than alkanes. It is therefore sometimes employed to crystallise highly lipophilic compounds.

== Other ==
It is used in liquid bandages (spray-on plasters) such as Cavilon spray, to protect damaged skin from irritation from other bodily fluids. It is also used to soften and remove adhesive residues left by medical tape and bandages, without causing further skin irritation.

HMDSO is being studied for making low-k dielectric materials for the semiconductor industries by plasma-enhanced chemical vapour deposition (PECVD).

HMDSO has been used as a reporter molecule to measure tissue oxygen tension (pO_{2}). HMDSO is highly hydrophobic and exhibits high gas solubility, and hence strong nuclear magnetic resonance spin lattice relaxation rate (R1) response to changes in pO_{2}. Molecular symmetry provides a single NMR signal. Following direct injection into tissues it has been used to generate maps of tumour and muscle oxygenation dynamics with respect to hyperoxic gas breathing challenge.
