= Decamethylcyclopentasiloxane =

- Structural formula

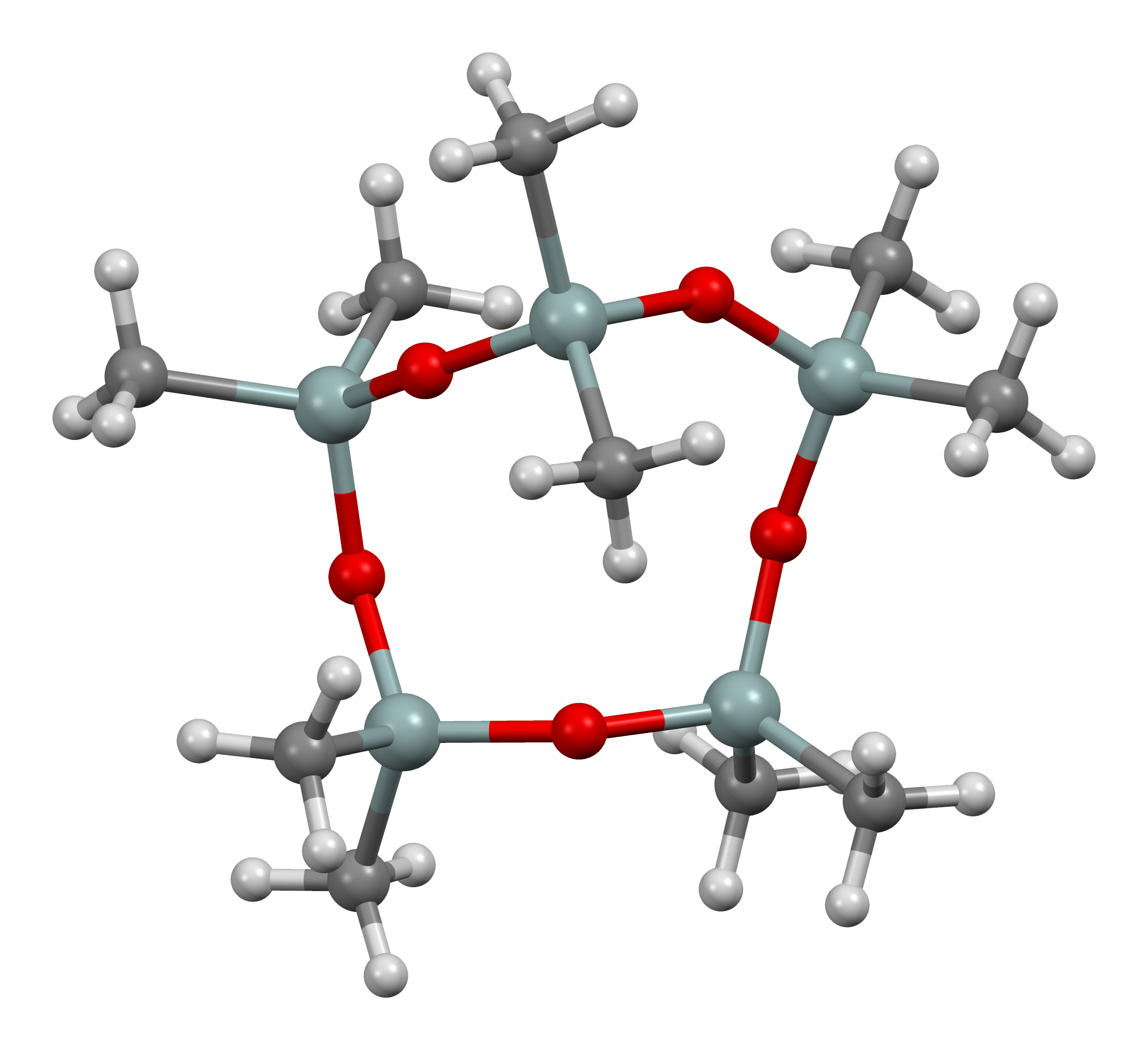
- Ball-and-stick model of the molecule as found in the crystal structure determined by single-crystal X-ray diffraction

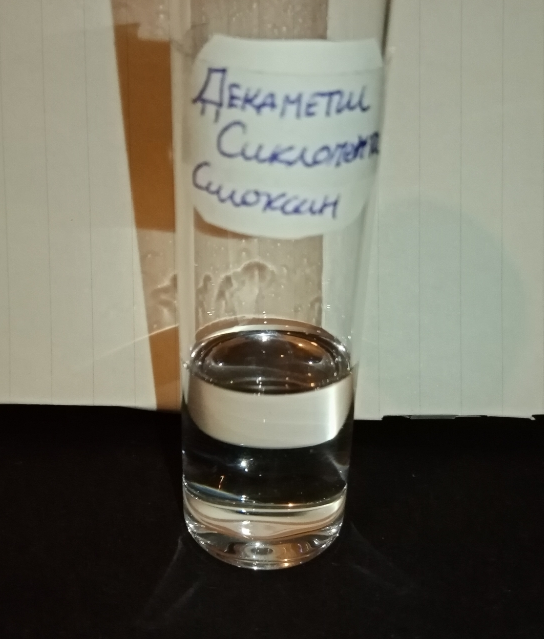
- Sample of decamethylcyclopentasiloxane

Names
- Preferred IUPAC name Decamethyl-1,3,5,7,9,2,4,6,8,10-pentaoxapentasilecane
- Other names: Cyclopentamethicone; Cyclic dimethylsiloxane pentamer; D_{5}; D5; 2,2,4,4,6,6,8,8,10,10-Decamethylcyclopentasiloxane; GreenEarth

Identifiers
CAS Number	541-02-6
3D model (JSmol)	Interactive image; Interactive image
Beilstein Reference	1800166
ChEMBL	ChEMBL1885178
ChemSpider	10451
DrugBank	DB11244
ECHA InfoCard	100.007.969
EC Number	208-764-9
MeSH	Decamethylcyclopentasiloxane
PubChem CID	10913
RTECS number	GY5945200
UNII	0THT5PCI0R
CompTox Dashboard (EPA)	DTXSID1027184
- InChI: InChI=1S/C10H30O5Si5/c1-16(2)11-17(3,4)13-19(7,8)15-20(9,10)14-18(5,6)12-16/h1-10H3 Key: XMSXQFUHVRWGNA-UHFFFAOYSA-N; InChI=1/C10H30O5Si5/c1-16(2)11-17(3,4)13-19(7,8)15-20(9,10)14-18(5,6)12-16/h1-10H3 Key: XMSXQFUHVRWGNA-UHFFFAOYAC
- SMILES: C[Si]1(C)O[Si](C)(C)O[Si](C)(C)O[Si](C)(C)O[Si](C)(C)O1; O1[Si](O[Si](O[Si](O[Si](O[Si]1(C)C)(C)C)(C)C)(C)C)(C)C

Properties
Chemical formula	[(CH_{3})_{2}SiO]_{5}
Molar mass	370.770 g·mol^{−1}
Appearance	Colourless liquid
Density	0.959 g/cm^{3} (20 °C)
Melting point	−38 °C (−36 °F; 235 K)
Boiling point	210 °C (410 °F; 483 K)
Solubility in water	17.03±0.72 ppb (23 °C)
log P	8.07
Vapor pressure	20.4±1.1 Pa (25 °C)
Refractive index (n_{D})	1.3982
Viscosity	3.74 cP

Hazards
- GHS labelling
Pictograms	(GHS02: Flammable) (GHS08: Health hazard)
Signal word	Warning
Hazard statements	H226, H361, H412, H413
Precautionary statements	P201, P202, P210, P233, P240, P241, P242, P243, P273, P280, P281, P303+P361+P353, P308+P313, P370+P378, P403+P235, P405, P501
NFPA 704 (fire diamond)	1 2 0
Flash point	73 °C (163 °F; 346 K)
Safety data sheet (SDS)	External MSDS

Related compounds
Related Organosilicon compounds	Octamethylcyclotetrasiloxane
- Except where otherwise noted, data are given for materials in their standard state (at 25 °C [77 °F], 100 kPa). verify (what is ?) Infobox references

Decamethylcyclopentasiloxane, also known as D_{5} or D5, is an organosilicon compound with the formula [(CH_{3})_{2}SiO]_{5}. It is a colorless and odorless liquid that is slightly volatile. It is used in various cosmetic products. It also is used as a dry cleaning solvent and has been marketed as an "eco-friendly" and "green" alternative to perchloroethylene in the 2000s, under the tradename GreenEarth. Decamethylcyclopentasiloxane is persistent in nature and bioaccumulative. Decamethylcyclopentasiloxane is acutely non-toxic but its long-term health effects are unknown.

== Use ==
The compound is classified as a cyclomethicone. Such fluids are commonly used in cosmetics, such as deodorants, sunblocks, hair sprays and skin care products. It is becoming more common in hair conditioners, as it makes the hair easier to brush without breakage. It is also used as part of silicone-based personal lubricants. D_{5} is considered an emollient. In Canada, among the volume used in consumer products approximately 70% were for antiperspirants and 20% for hair care products. 10,000–100,000 tonnes per year of D_{5} is manufactured and/or imported in the European Economic Area. Atmospheric emissions of D_{5} in the Northern Hemisphere were estimated to 30,000 tonnes per year.

Decamethylcyclopentasiloxane is also used as a dry-cleaning solvent. It was first marketed by GreenEarth Cleaning in the 1990s and was claimed to be eco-friendlier than tetrachloroethylene (the most common dry-cleaning solvent worldwide since the 1950s) despite being controlled in the EU for to its "very persistent and very bioaccumulative" (vPvB) characteristics. Decamethylcyclopentasiloxane is more bioaccumulative than tetrachloroethylene and it does not break down in nature. Its use in dry cleaning will be prohibited in the European Union after June 2026 due to its environmental effect.

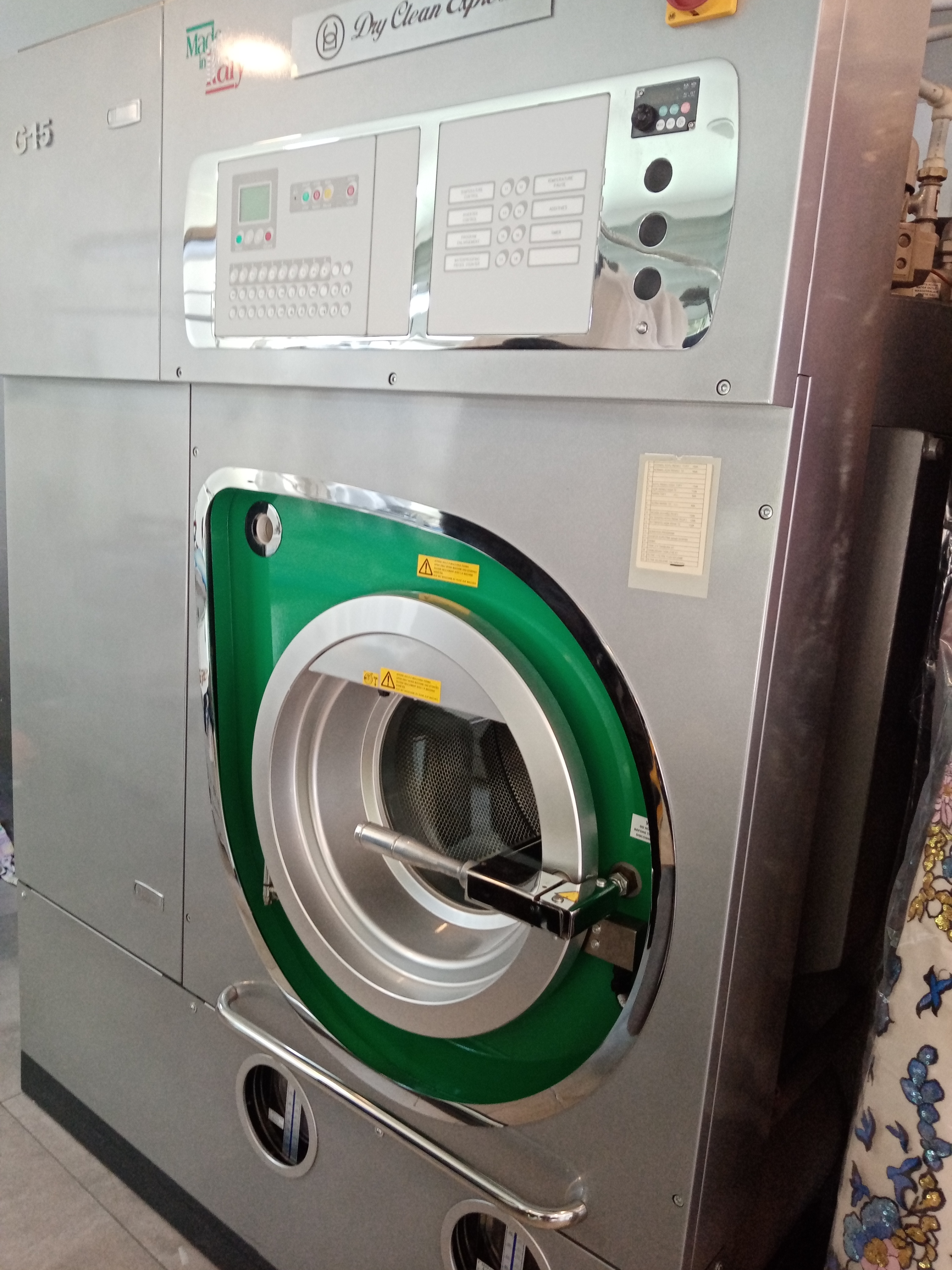
An Italian dry cleaning machine for decamethylcyclopentasiloxane used in Turkey in the 2020s. It uses various filters to clean used solvent.

== Production and polymerization ==
Commercially D_{5} is produced from dimethyldichlorosilane. Hydrolysis of the dichloride produces a mixture of cyclic dimethylsiloxanes and polydimethylsiloxane. From this mixture, the cyclic siloxanes including D_{5} can be removed by distillation. In the presence of a strong base such as KOH, the polymer/ring mixture is equilibrated, allowing complete conversion to the more volatile cyclic siloxanes:

[(CH_{3})_{2}SiO]_{5n} → n [(CH_{3})_{2}SiO]_{5}

where n is a positive integer. D_{4} and D_{5} are also precursors to the polymer. The catalyst is again KOH.

Decamethylcyclopentasiloxane was first isolated in 1946 as a component hydrolysis products of dimethyldichlorosilane.

== Safety and environmental considerations ==
D_{5} is acutely nontoxic with an LD_{50} of >50 g/kg for rats. It has caused tumours in female rats but it was not evaluated further for possible carcinogenicity. It may affect the liver and the immune system in long term. Possible negative long-term effects of D5 were not investigated.

The environmental impacts of D_{5} and D_{4} have attracted attention because these compounds are pervasive. Cyclic siloxanes have been detected in some species of aquatic life. A scientific review in Canada has determined that “Siloxane D5 does not pose a danger to the environment” and a scientific assessment of D5 by the Australian government stated, "the direct risks to aquatic life from exposure to these chemicals at expected surface water concentrations are not likely to be significant." However, in the European Union, D_{5} was characterized as a substance of very high concern (SVHC) due to its PBT and vPvB properties and was thus included in the candidate list for authorisation. Since 31 January 2020, D_{5} cannot be placed on the market in the European Union in wash-off cosmetic products in a concentration equal to or greater than 0.1 % by weight.

== See also ==
- Hexamethylcyclotrisiloxane (D_{3})
- Octamethylcyclotetrasiloxane (D_{4})
