= Fluorographene =

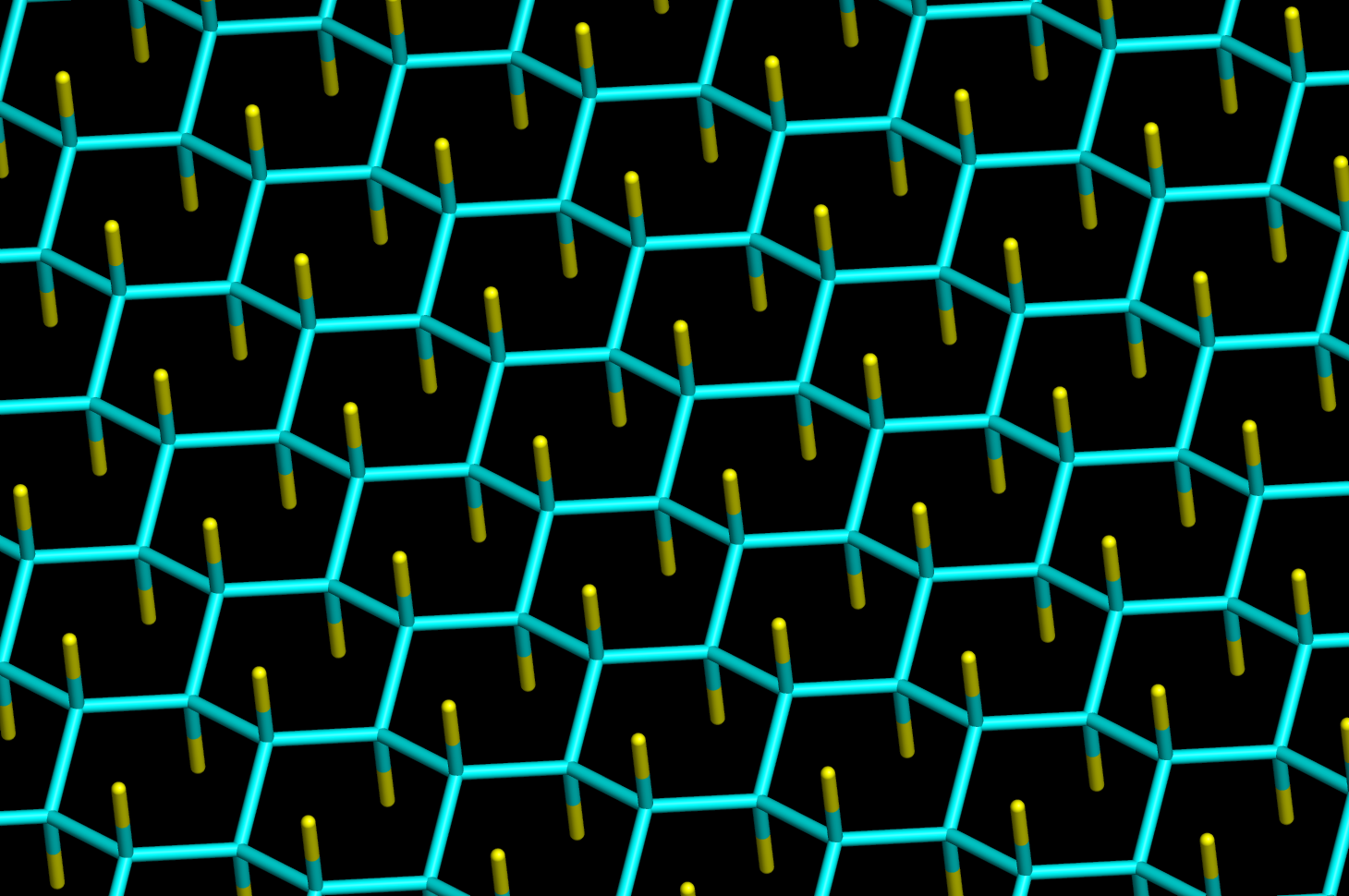

Identifiers
ChemSpider	none

Properties
Chemical formula	CF_{1(.1)}
Molar mass	Variable
- Except where otherwise noted, data are given for materials in their standard state (at 25 °C [77 °F], 100 kPa). (what is ?) Infobox references

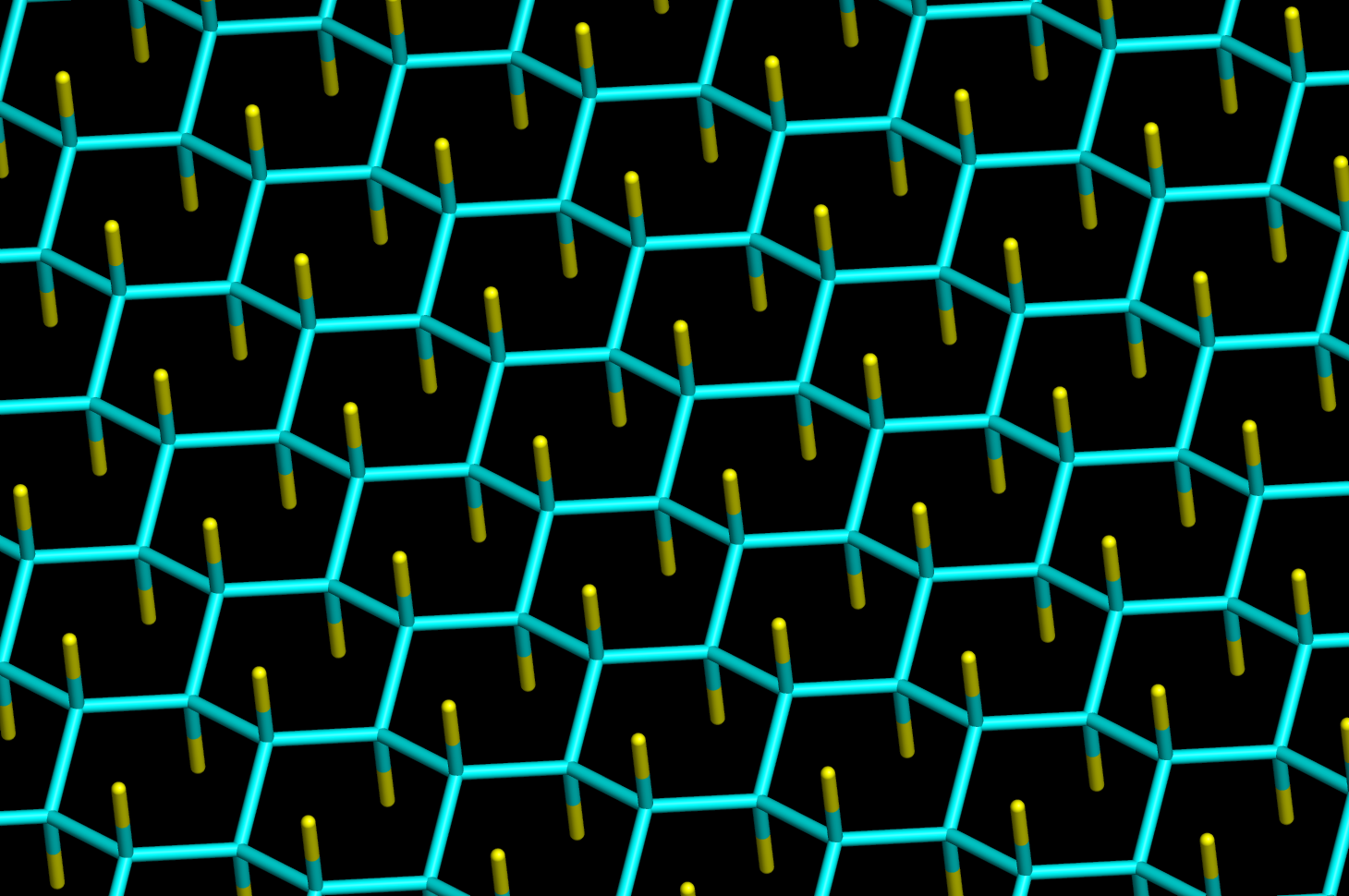
Fluorographene structure in chair conformation seen from above

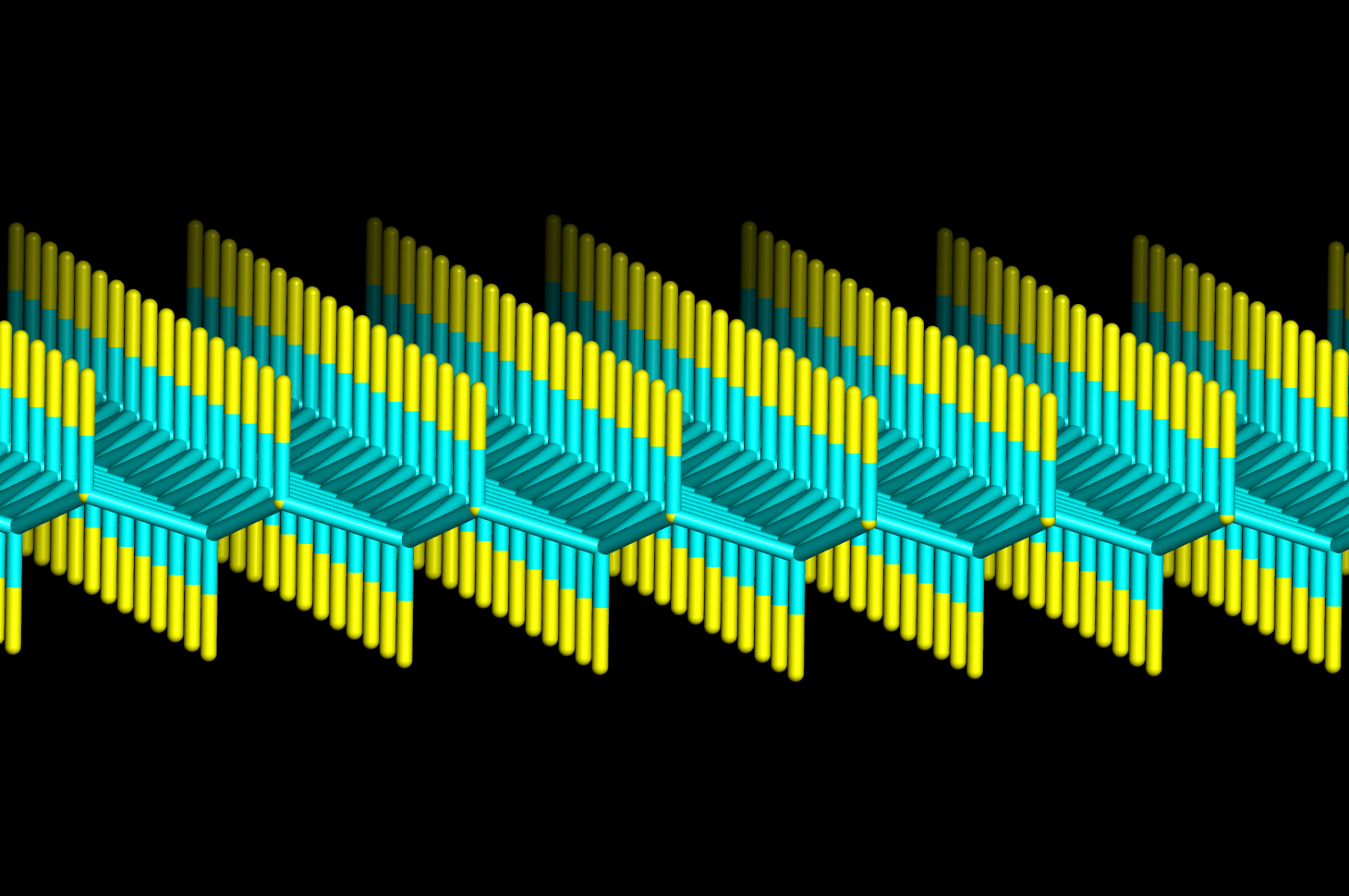
Fluorographene in chair structure seen from side

Fluorographene (or perfluorographane, graphene fluoride) is a fluorocarbon derivative of graphene. It is a two dimensional carbon sheet of sp^{3} hybridized carbons, with each carbon atom bound to one fluorine. The chemical formula is (CF)_{n}. In comparison, Teflon (polytetrafluoroethylene), -(CF_{2})_{n}-, consists of carbon "chains" with each carbon bound to two fluorines.

Unlike fluorographene, graphene is unsaturated (sp^{2} hybridized) and completely carbon. The hydrocarbon analogue to fluorographene is sp^{3} hybridized graphane. Similar to other fluorocarbons (e.g. perfluorohexane), fluorographene is highly insulating. Fluorographene is thermally stable, resembling polytetrafluoroethylene; however, chemically it is reactive. It can be transformed back into graphene by reaction with potassium iodide at high temperatures. During reactions of fluorographene with NaOH and NaSH simultaneous reductive defluorination and substitution are observed. The reactivity of fluorographene represents a facile way towards graphene derivatives.

== Preparation ==
The material was first created in 2010 by growing graphene on copper foil exposed to xenon difluoride at 30 °C. It was discovered soon after that fluorographene could also be prepared by combining cleaved graphene on a gold grid while being exposed to xenon difluoride at 70 °C. Also in 2010 Withers et al. described exfoliation of fluorinated graphite (monolayer, 24% fluorination) and Cheng et al. reported reversible graphene fluorination. Stoichiometric fluorographene was also prepared by chemical exfoliation of graphite fluoride. It was also shown that graphene fluoride can be transformed back into graphene via reaction with iodine, which forms graphene iodide as a short lived intermediate.

== Structure ==
The structure of fluorographene can be derived from the structure of graphite monofluoride (CF)_{n}, which consists of weakly bound stacked fluorographene layers, and its most stable conformation (predicted for the monocrystal) contains an infinite array of trans-linked cyclohexane chairs with covalent C–F bonds in an AB stacking sequence. The estimated C-F distance is 136-138 pm, C-C distance is 157-158 pm and the C-C-C angle is 110°. Possible fluorographene conformations have been extensively investigated computationally.

== Electronic properties ==
Fluorographene is considered a wide gap semiconductor, because its I-V characteristics are strongly nonlinear with a nearly gate-independent resistance greater than 1 GΩ. In addition, fluorescence and NEXAFS measurements indicate band gap higher than 3.8 eV. Theoretical calculations show that estimation of fluorographene band gap is rather challenging task, as GGA functional provides band gap of 3.1 eV, hybrid (HSE06) 4.9 eV, GW 8.1 eV on top of PBE 8.1 or 8.3 eV on top of HSE06. The optical transition calculated by the Bethe-Salpeter equation is equal to 5.1 eV and points to an extremely strong exciton binding energy of 1.9 eV. It has recently been demonstrated that using fluorographene as a passivation layer in Field Effect Transistors (FETs) featuring a graphene channel, carrier mobility increases significantly.

== Reaction ==
Fluorographene is susceptible for nucleophilic substitution and reductive defluorination, which makes it an extraordinary precursor material for synthesis of numerous graphene derivatives. Both of these channels can be used to chemically manipulate fluorographene, and they can be tuned by suitable conditions, e.g., solvent. In 2010 it was shown that fluorographene can be transformed to graphene by treatment with KI. Nucleophiles can substitute the fluorine atoms and induce partial or full defluorination. The fluorographene reactivity is triggered by point defects. The knowledge on fluorographene reactivity can be used for synthesis of new graphene derivatives, which contain i) mixture of F and other functional groups (like, e.g., thiofluorographene containing both -F and -SH) or ii) selectively only the functional group (and any -F groups). Alkyl and aryl groups can be selectively attached to graphene using Grignard reaction with fluorographene and this reaction leads to high-degree of graphene functionalization. Very promising and selective graphene derivative cyanographene (graphene nitrile) was synthesized by reaction of NaCN with fluorographene. This material was further used for synthesis of graphene acid, i.e., graphene functionalized by -COOH groups over its surface, and it was shown that this graphene acid can be effectively conjugated with amines and alcohols. These findings open new door for high-yield and selective graphene functionalization.

== Other halogenated graphenes ==
Recent studies have also revealed that, similar to fluorination, full chlorination of graphene can be achieved. The resulting structure is called chlorographene. However other theoretical calculations questioned stability of chlorographene under ambient conditions.

Also graphene can be fluorinated or halofluorinated by CVD-method with fluorocarbons, hydro- or halofluorocarbons by heating while in contact of carbon material with fluoroorganic substance to form partially fluorinated carbons (so called Fluocar materials).

An overview on preparation, reactivity and properties of halogenated graphenes in available in ACS Nano journal free of charge.

== See also ==
- "Chlorographene"
- Organofluorine chemistry
- Organofluorine compound
- Diamond
- Graphane
