= Octamethylcyclotetrasiloxane =

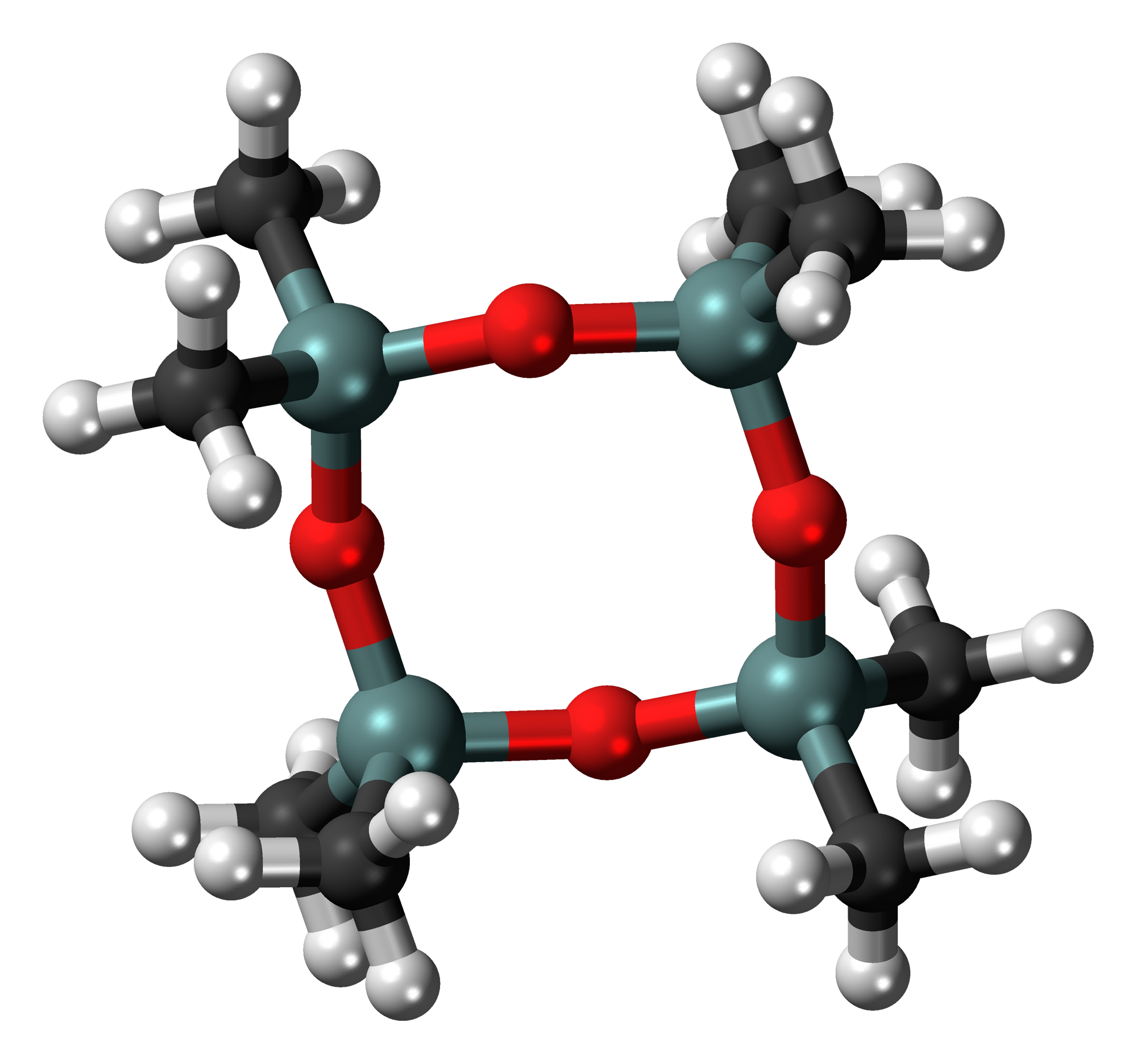

Names
- Preferred IUPAC name Octamethyl-1,3,5,7,2,4,6,8-tetroxatetrasilocane
- Other names: D_{4}; D4; OMCTS

Identifiers
CAS Number	556-67-2
3D model (JSmol)	Interactive image
ChEBI	CHEBI:25640
ChemSpider	10696
ECHA InfoCard	100.008.307
EC Number	209-136-7
PubChem CID	11169
UNII	CZ227117JE
CompTox Dashboard (EPA)	DTXSID7027205
- InChI: InChI=1S/C8H24O4Si4/c1-13(2)9-14(3,4)11-16(7,8)12-15(5,6)10-13/h1-8H3 Key: HMMGMWAXVFQUOA-UHFFFAOYSA-N
- SMILES: C[Si]1(O[Si](O[Si](O[Si](O1)(C)C)(C)C)(C)C)C

Properties
Chemical formula	[(CH_{3})_{2}SiO]_{4}
Molar mass	296.616 g·mol^{−1}
Density	0.956 g/mL
Melting point	17–18 °C (63–64 °F; 290–291 K)
Boiling point	175–176 °C (347–349 °F; 448–449 K)
Solubility in water	56.2±2.5 ppb (23 °C)
log P	6.98±0.13
Vapor pressure	124.5±6.2 Pa (25 °C)

Hazards
- GHS labelling
Pictograms	(GHS08: Health hazard)
Signal word	Warning
Hazard statements	H361f, H410 M=10

Related compounds
Related compounds	Disiloxane; Tetramethylsilane; Dimethyl ether; Bis(trimethylsilyl)amine; Tetrakis(trimethylsilyloxy)silane
- Except where otherwise noted, data are given for materials in their standard state (at 25 °C [77 °F], 100 kPa). Infobox references

Octamethylcyclotetrasiloxane, also called D_{4} or D4, is an organosilicon compound and one of a number of cyclic siloxanes (cyclomethicones). It is a colorless viscous liquid with a high boiling point. It has historically been used on a large scale in personal care products including cosmetics, hair conditioners and emollients (moisturising creams), Global production in 1993 was 136,000 tons, however it is now facing significant pressure from regulators. It is a substance of very high concern In the EU, where it was classified as a PBT and effectively banned in personal care products in 2018. The US EPA began reevaluating its risks in 2020. Replacements include branched-chain alkanes (isoparaffins).

== Production and polymerization ==
Commercially D_{4} is produced from dimethyldichlorosilane. Hydrolysis of the dichloride produces a mixture of cyclic dimethylsiloxanes and polydimethylsiloxane. From this mixture, the cyclic siloxanes including D_{4} can be removed by distillation. In the presence of a strong base such as KOH, the polymer/ring mixture is equilibrated, allowing complete conversion to the more volatile cyclic siloxanes:

[(CH_{3})_{2}SiO]_{4n} → n [(CH_{3})_{2}SiO]_{4}

D_{4} and D_{5} are also precursors to the polymer. The catalyst is again KOH.

== Safety and environmental considerations ==
D_{4} is of low acute toxicity. The LC_{50} for a single four hour inhalation exposure in rats is 36 mg/L. The oral LD_{50} in rats is above 4800 mg/kg and the dermal LD_{50}in rats is above 2400 mg/kg.

As the smallest cyclic dimethylsiloxane that does not experience considerable ring strain, D_{4} is one of the most abundant siloxanes in the environment, e.g. in landfill gases. D_{4} and D_{5} have attracted attention because they are pervasive. Cyclic siloxanes can be detected in some species of aquatic life. An independent, peer-reviewed study in the US found "negligible risk from D4 to organisms" while a scientific assessment by the Australian government stated, "the direct risks to aquatic life from exposure to these chemicals at expected surface water concentrations are not likely to be significant."

In the European Union, D_{4} was characterized as a substance of very high concern (SVHC) due to its PBT and vPvB properties and was thus included in the candidate list for authorisation. D_{4} shall not be placed on the market in wash-off cosmetic products in a concentration equal to or greater than 0.1% by weight of either substance, after 31 January 2020. Conversely, a detailed review and analysis of the science by the State of Washington in 2017 led to the removal of D_{4} from their "Chemicals of High Concern to Children" listing. That decision prompted the State of Oregon to follow suit in 2018.

== See also ==
- Hexamethylcyclotrisiloxane (D_{3})
- Decamethylcyclopentasiloxane (D_{5})
