= Carbon monofluoride =

Identifiers
CAS Number	51311-17-2
3D model (JSmol)	Interactive image
ECHA InfoCard	100.051.920
EC Number	257-131-3
- InChI: InChI=1S/C.F/
- SMILES: [C].[F]

Properties
Chemical formula	(CF)_{x}
- Except where otherwise noted, data are given for materials in their standard state (at 25 °C [77 °F], 100 kPa). Infobox references

Carbon monofluoride (CF, CF_{x}, or (CF)_{n}), also called polycarbon monofluoride (PMF), polycarbon fluoride, poly(carbon monofluoride), and graphite fluoride, is a material formed by high-temperature reaction of fluorine gas with graphite, charcoal, or pyrolytic carbon powder. It is a highly hydrophobic microcrystalline powder. Its CAS number is 51311-17-2. In contrast to graphite intercalation compounds it is a covalent graphite compound.

Carbon is stable in a fluorine atmosphere up to about 400 °C, but between 420 and 600 °C a reaction takes place to give substoichiometric carbon monofluoride, CF_{0.68}, appearing dark grey. With increasing temperature and fluorine pressure stoichiometries up to CF_{1.12} are formed. With increasing fluorine content the color changes from dark grey to cream white, indicating the loss of the aromatic character. The fluorine atoms are located in an alternating fashion above and below the former graphene plane, which is now buckled due to formation of covalent carbon-fluorine bonds. Reaction of carbon with fluorine at even higher temperature successively destroys the graphite compound to yield a mixture of gaseous fluorocarbons such as tetrafluoromethane, CF_{4}, and tetrafluoroethylene, C_{2}F_{4}.

In a similar fashion, in 2001 it was found that the carbon allotrope fullerene, C_{60} reacts with fluorine gas to give fullerene fluorides with stoichiometries up to C_{60}F_{48}.

A precursor of carbon monofluoride is the fluorine-graphite intercalation compound, also called fluorine-GIC.

Other intercalation fluorides of carbon are:

- poly(dicarbon fluoride) ((C_{2}F)_{n});
- tetracarbon monofluoride (TCMF, C_{4}F).

Graphite fluoride is a precursor for preparation of graphene fluoride by a liquid phase exfoliation.

== Application ==
Carbon monofluoride is used as a high-energy-density cathode material in lithium batteries of the "BR" type. Other uses are a wear reduction additive for lubricants, and weather-resistant additive for paints. Graphite fluoride is also used as both oxidizing agent and combustion modifier in rocket propellants and pyrolants.

Carbon monofluoride is commercially available as Carbofluor-brand materials.
