= Lithium metasilicate =

Names
- IUPAC name Lithium metasilicate

Identifiers
CAS Number	10102-24-6
3D model (JSmol)	Interactive image
ChemSpider	162106396
ECHA InfoCard	100.030.232
EC Number	233-270-5
PubChem CID	66243
UNII	5QDO50LGBD
CompTox Dashboard (EPA)	DTXSID30904264
- InChI: InChI=1S/2Li.O3Si/c;;1-4(2)3/q2*+1;-2 Key: PAZHGORSDKKUPI-UHFFFAOYSA-N
- SMILES: [Li+].[Li+].[O-][Si](=O)[O-]

Properties
Chemical formula	Li_{2}SiO_{3}
Molar mass	89.566 g/mol
Appearance	colorless crystals
Density	2.52 g/cm^{3}
Melting point	1,201 °C (2,194 °F; 1,474 K)
Solubility in water	insoluble
Refractive index (n_{D})	1.584

Structure
Crystal structure	orthorhombic

Thermochemistry
Heat capacity (C)	99.1 J/mol K
Std molar entropy (S^{⦵}_{298})	79.8 J/mol K
Std enthalpy of formation (Δ_{f}H^{⦵}_{298})	−1648 kJ/mol
Gibbs free energy (Δ_{f}G^{⦵})	28 kJ/mol
- Except where otherwise noted, data are given for materials in their standard state (at 25 °C [77 °F], 100 kPa). Infobox references

Lithium metasilicate is an ionic compound with the formula Li_{2}SiO_{3}

== Preparation ==
Lithium metasilicate is prepared by the reaction of lithium carbonate and silicon dioxide at temperatures around 800-900°C.

== Applications ==
The melting of lithium metasilicate is used for the calibration of thermocouples.
