= Hexamethylcyclotrisiloxane =

Names
- IUPAC name 2,2,4,4,6,6-hexamethyl-1,3,5,2,4,6-trioxatrisilinane
- Other names: Hexamethyltrisiloxane; Dimethylsiloxane trimer; D_{3}; D3

Identifiers
CAS Number	541-05-9
3D model (JSmol)	Interactive image
ChemSpider	10452
ECHA InfoCard	100.007.970
EC Number	208-765-4
PubChem CID	10914
UNII	EPV75L8O0R
CompTox Dashboard (EPA)	DTXSID6027185
- InChI: InChI=1S/C6H18O3Si3/c1-10(2)7-11(3,4)9-12(5,6)8-10/h1-6H3 Key: HTDJPCNNEPUOOQ-UHFFFAOYSA-N
- SMILES: C[Si]1(O[Si](O[Si](O1)(C)C)(C)C)C

Properties
Chemical formula	[(CH_{3})_{2}SiO]_{3}
Molar mass	222.462 g·mol^{−1}
Appearance	Colorless or white solid
Density	1.02 g/cm^{3}
Melting point	64 °C (147 °F; 337 K)
Boiling point	134 °C (273 °F; 407 K)

Hazards
- GHS labelling
Pictograms	(GHS02: Flammable) (GHS07: Exclamation mark)
Signal word	Warning
Hazard statements	H228, H315, H319, H335
Precautionary statements	P210, P240, P241, P261, P264, P271, P280, P302+P352, P304+P340, P305+P351+P338, P312, P321, P332+P313, P337+P313, P362, P370+P378, P403+P233, P405, P501
- Except where otherwise noted, data are given for materials in their standard state (at 25 °C [77 °F], 100 kPa). Infobox references

Hexamethylcyclotrisiloxane, also known as D_{3} or D3, is an organosilicon compound with the chemical formula [(CH_{3})_{2}SiO]_{3}. It is a colorless or white volatile solid. It finds limited use in organic chemistry. The larger tetrameric and pentameric siloxanes, respectively octamethylcyclotetrasiloxane and decamethylcyclopentasiloxane, are of significant industrial interest, whereas 1,000–10,000 tonnes per year of the trimer is manufactured and/or imported in the European Economic Area.

== Structure and reactions ==
Hexamethylcyclotrisiloxane adopts a planar structure and is considered strained. It reacts with organolithium reagents to give, after hydrolysis, dimethylsilanols:

[(CH_{3})_{2}SiO]_{3} + 3 RLi → 3 RSi(CH_{3})_{2}OLi
RSi(CH_{3})_{2}OLi + H_{2}O → RSi(CH_{3})_{2}OH + LiOH

== Safety and environmental considerations ==
The LD_{50} for the related pentamer (D_{5}) is >50 g/kg in rats.

== See also ==
- Octamethylcyclotetrasiloxane (D_{4})
- Decamethylcyclopentasiloxane (D_{5})
