= Calcium disilicide =

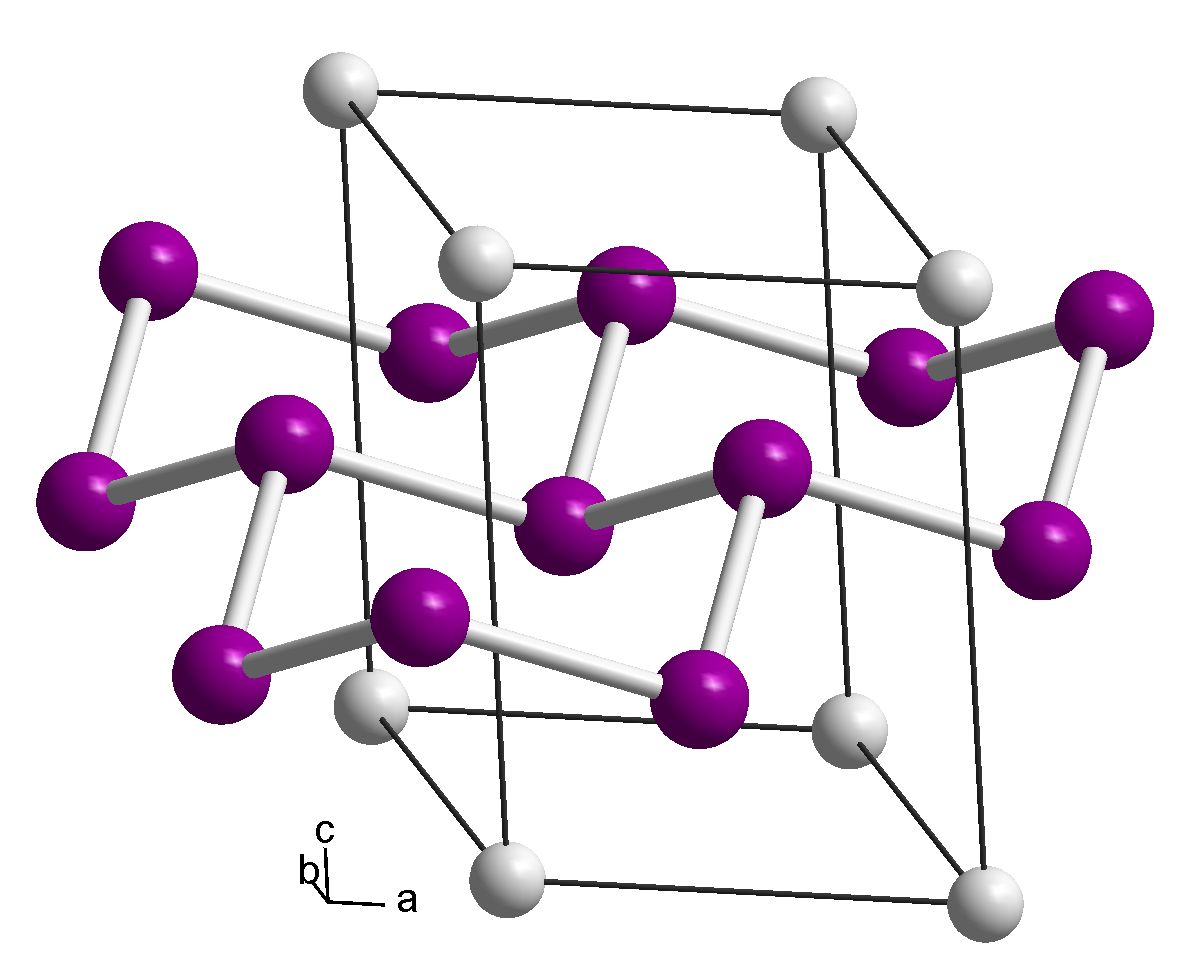
- hR9 unit cell

Identifiers
CAS Number	12013-56-8
3D model (JSmol)	Interactive image
ChemSpider	3365368
ECHA InfoCard	100.031.431
EC Number	234-588-7
PubChem CID	170839545
CompTox Dashboard (EPA)	DTXSID70892171
- InChI: InChI=1S/Ca.2Si Key: HAUJAPUPPYHUGS-UHFFFAOYSA-N
- SMILES: [Si].[Si].[Ca]

Properties
Chemical formula	CaSi_{2}
Molar mass	96.249 g/mol
Appearance	grey solid
Density	2.50 g/cm^{3}
Melting point	1,040 °C (1,900 °F; 1,310 K)
Solubility in water	insoluble

Structure
Crystal structure	Trigonal, hR9/hR18,
Space group	R3̅m, No. 166
Lattice constant	a = 0.38295/0.3855 nm, c = 1.5904/3.06 nm
Formula units (Z)	3/6

Hazards
- GHS labelling
Pictograms	(GHS02: Flammable)
Signal word	Danger
Hazard statements	H261
Precautionary statements	P231+P232, P280, P370+P378, P402+P404, P501
- Except where otherwise noted, data are given for materials in their standard state (at 25 °C [77 °F], 100 kPa). verify (what is ?) Infobox references

Calcium disilicide (CaSi_{2}) is an inorganic compound, a silicide of calcium. It is a whitish or dark grey to black solid matter with melting point 1033 °C. It is insoluble in water, but may decompose when subjected to moisture, evolving hydrogen and producing calcium hydroxide. It decomposes in hot water, and is flammable and may ignite spontaneously in air.

Industrial calcium silicide usually contains iron and aluminium as the primary contaminants, and low amounts of carbon and sulfur.

== Properties ==
At ambient conditions calcium disilicide exists in two polymorphs, hR9 and hR18; in the hR18 structure the hR9 unit cell is stacked twice along the c axis. Upon heating to 1000 °C at a pressure of ca. 40 kBar, calcium disilicide converts to a (semi-stable) tetragonal phase. The tetragonal phase is a superconductor with a transition temperature of 1.37 K to 1.58 K. Although there is no observable superconducting transition temperature for the trigonal/rhombohedral (i.e. hR9 and hR18 unit cells) at ambient pressure, under high pressure (>12 GPa/120 kbar) this phase has been observed exhibit superconducting transition. When the trigonal phase is placed under pressures exceeding 16 GPa, there is a phase transition to an AlB_{2}-like phase.

== Uses ==
=== Alloys ===
Calcium silicide is used for manufacture of special metal alloys, e.g. for removing phosphorus and as a deoxidizer.

=== Pyrotechnics ===
In pyrotechnics, it is used as fuel to make special mixtures, e.g. for production of smokes, in flash compositions, and in percussion caps. Specification for pyrotechnic calcium silicide is MIL-C-324C. In some mixtures it may be substituted with ferrosilicon. Silicon-based fuels are used in some time delay mixtures, e.g. for controlling of explosive bolts, hand grenades, and infrared decoys. Smoke compositions often contain hexachloroethane; during burning they produce silicon tetrachloride, which, like titanium tetrachloride used in smoke-screens, reacts with air moisture and produces dense white fog. Gum arabic is used in some mixtures to inhibit calcium silicide decomposition.

=== Heating food ===
Self-heating cans of military food rations developed during WWII used a thermite-like mixture of 1:1 iron(II,III) oxide and calcium silicide. Such mixture, when ignited, generates moderate amount of heat and no gaseous products.
