= Nanosheet =

Extremely thin plane of material

A nanosheet is a two-dimensional nanostructure with thickness in a scale ranging from 1 to 100 nm.

A typical example of a nanosheet is graphene, the thinnest two-dimensional material (0.34 nm) in the world. It consists of a single layer of carbon atoms with hexagonal lattices.

== Examples and applications ==
As of 2017, silicon nanosheets were being used to prototype future generations of small (5 nm) transistors.

Carbon nanosheets (from hemp) may be an alternative to graphene as electrodes in supercapacitors.

Lithium cobalt oxide nanosheets show promise for use as cathodes in Li-ion battery applications.

== Synthesis ==
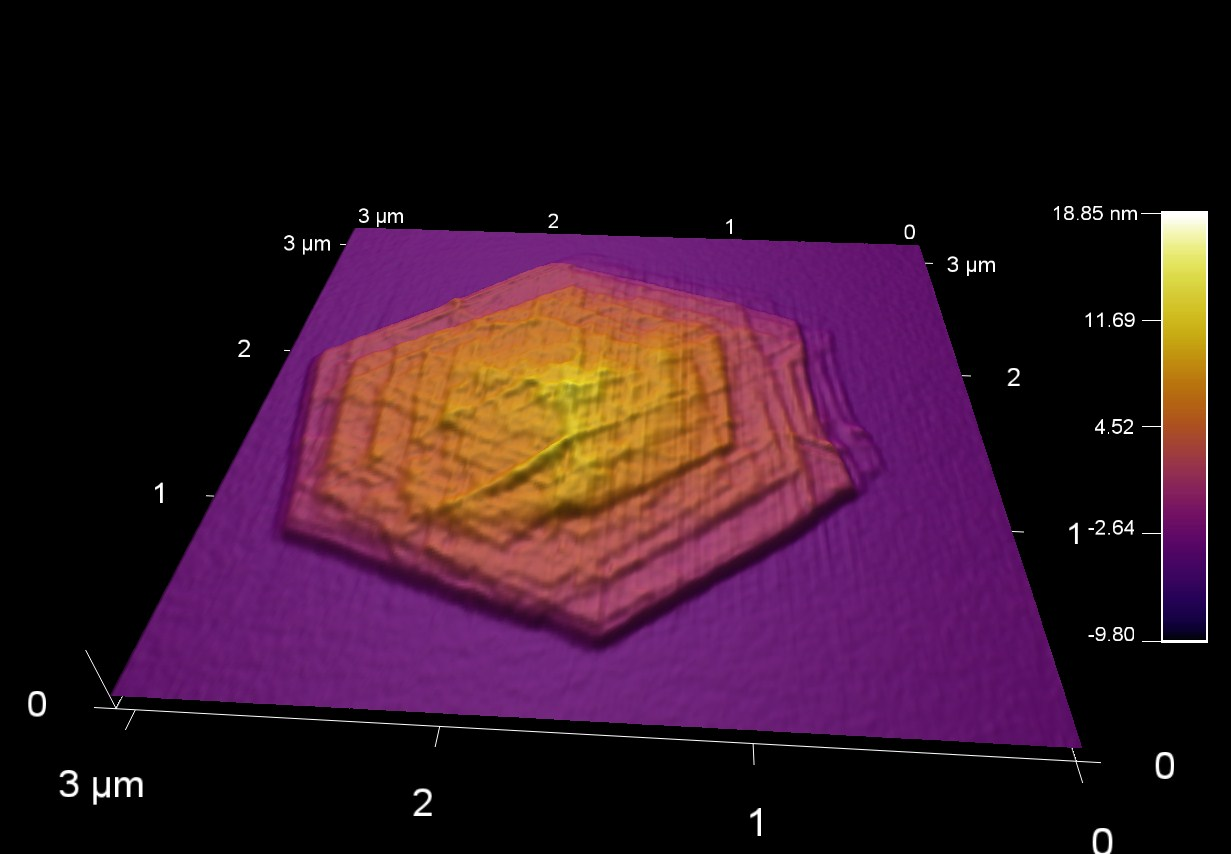
3D AFM topography image of multilayered palladium nanosheet on silicon wafer.

The most commonly used nanosheet synthesis methods use a bottom-up approach, e.g., pre-organization and polymerization at interfaces like Langmuir–Blodgett films, solution phase synthesis and chemical vapor deposition (CVD). For example, CdTe (cadmium telluride) nanosheets could be synthesized by precipitating and aging CdTe nanoparticles in deionized water. The formation of free-floating CdTe nanosheets was due to directional hydrophobic attraction and anisotropic electrostatic interactions caused by dipole moment and small positive charges. Molecular simulations through a coarse-grained model with parameters from semi-empirical quantum mechanics calculations can be used to prove the experimental process.

Ultrathin single-crystal PbS (lead sulfur) sheets with micro scale in x-, y- dimensions can be obtained using a hot colloidal synthesis method. Compounds with linear chloroalkanes like 1,2-dichloroethane containing chlorine were used during the formation of PbS sheets. PbS ultrathin sheets probably resulted from the oriented attachment of the PbS nanoparticles in a two-dimensional fashion. The highly reactive facets were preferentially consumed in the growth process that led to the sheet-like PbS crystal growth.

Nanosheets can also be prepared at room temperature. For instance, hexagonal PbO (lead oxide)) nanosheets were synthesized using gold nanoparticles as seeds under room temperature. The size of the PbO nanosheet can be tuned by gold NPs and Pb^{2+} concentration in the growth solution. No organic surfactants were employed in the synthesis process. Oriented attachment, in which the sheets form by aggregation of small nanoparticles that each has a net dipole moment, and ostwald ripening are the two main reasons for the formation of the PbO nanosheets. The same process was observed for iron sulfide nanoparticles.

Carbon nanosheets have been produced using industrial hemp bast fibres with a technique that involves heating the fibres at over 350F (180C) for 24 hours. The result is then subjected to intense heat causing the fibers to exfoliate into a carbon nanosheet. This has been used to create an electrode for a supercapacitor with electrochemical qualities ‘on a par with’ devices made using graphene.

Metal nanosheets have also been synthesized from solution-based method by reducing metal precursors, including palladium, rhodium, and gold.

== See also ==
- Graphene
- Two-dimensional polymer
- Colloidal gold
- Nanocrystal solar cell
- Nanoparticle
- Quantum dot
- Langmuir–Blodgett film
