= Graphane =

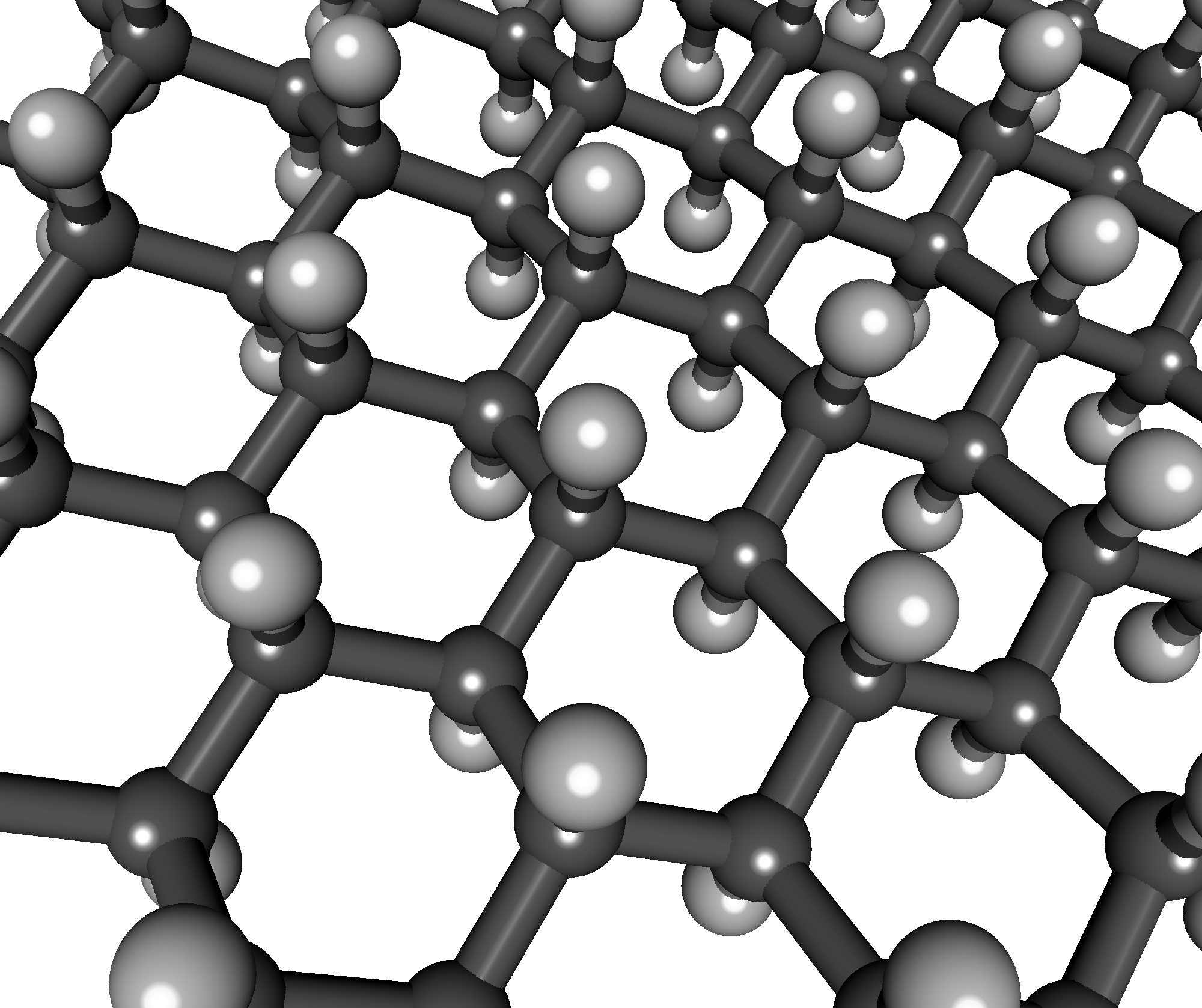

Identifiers
CAS Number	1221743-01-6
ChemSpider	none

Properties
Chemical formula	(CH)_{n}
Molar mass	Variable
- Except where otherwise noted, data are given for materials in their standard state (at 25 °C [77 °F], 100 kPa). verify (what is ?) Infobox references

Graphane is a two-dimensional polymer of carbon and hydrogen with the formula unit (CH)_{n} where n is large. Partial hydrogenation results in hydrogenated graphene, which was reported by Elias et al. in 2009 by a TEM study to be "direct evidence for a new graphene-based derivative". The authors viewed the panorama as "a whole range of new two-dimensional crystals with designed electronic and other properties". With the band gap ranges from 0 to 0.8 eV

== Synthesis ==
Its preparation was reported in 2009. Graphane can be formed by electrolytic hydrogenation of graphene, few-layer graphene or high-oriented pyrolytic graphite. In the last case mechanical exfoliation of hydrogenated top layers can be used.

== Structure ==
The first theoretical description of graphane was reported in 2003. The structure was found, using a cluster expansion method, to be the most stable of all the possible hydrogenation ratios of graphene. In 2007, researchers found that the compound is more stable than other compounds containing carbon and hydrogen, such as benzene, cyclohexane and polyethylene. This group named the predicted compound graphane, because it is the fully saturated version of graphene.

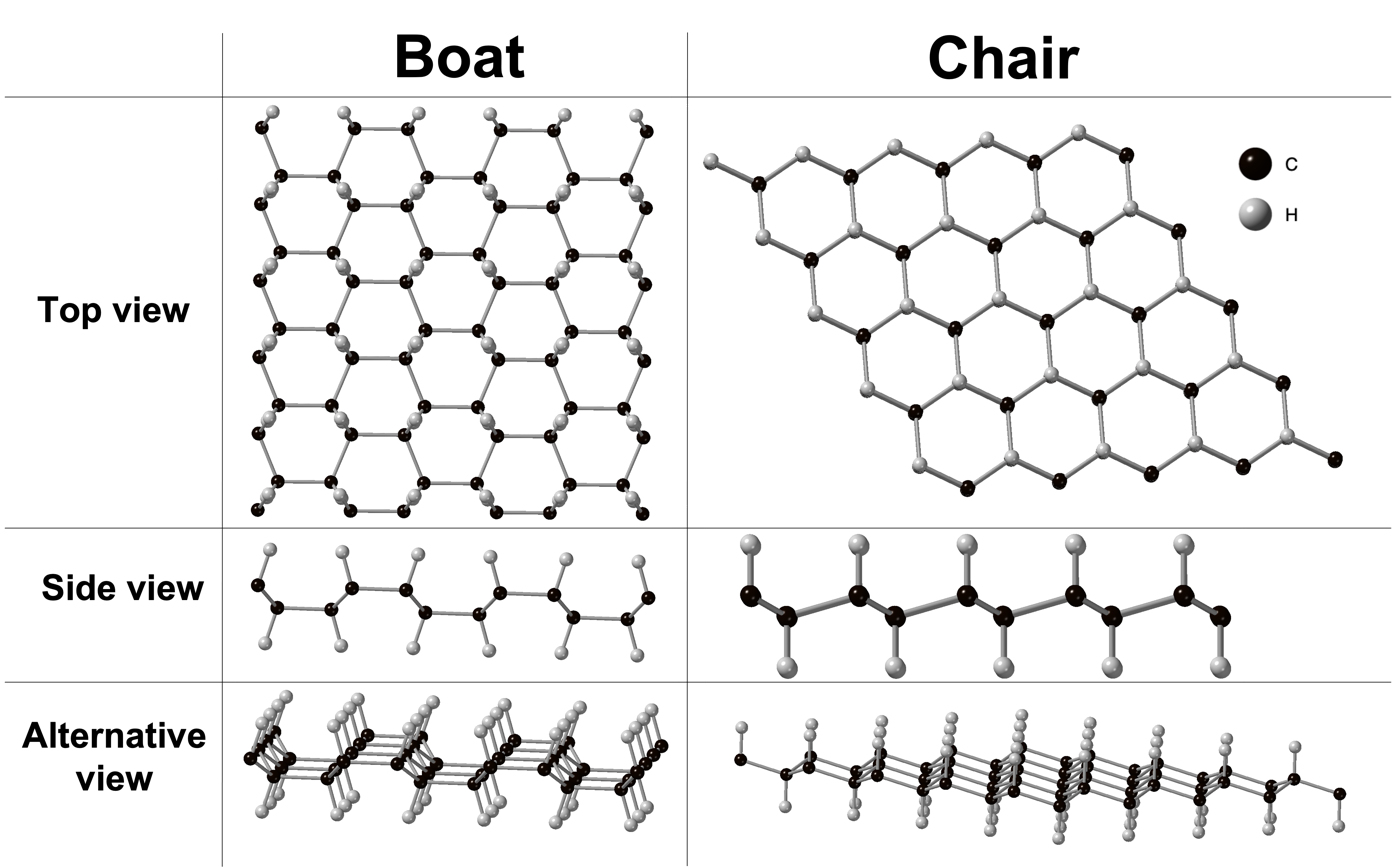
Boat and chair conformers of graphane

Graphane is effectively made up of cyclohexane units, and, in parallel to cyclohexane, the most stable structural conformation is not planar, but an out-of-plane structure, including the chair and boat conformers, in order to minimize ring strain and allow for the ideal tetrahedral bond angle of 109.5° for sp^{3}-bonded atoms. However, in contrast to cyclohexane, graphane cannot interconvert between these different conformers because not only are they topologically different, but they are also different structural isomers with different configurations. The chair conformer has the hydrogens alternating above or below the plane from carbon to neighboring carbon, while the boat conformer has the hydrogen atoms alternating in pairs above and below the plane. There are also other possible conformational isomers, including the twist-boat and twist-boat-chair. As with cyclohexane, the most stable conformer for graphane is the chair, followed by the twist-boat structure. While the buckling of the chair conformer would imply lattice shrinkage, calculations show the lattice actually expands by approximately 30% due to the opposing effect on the lattice spacing of the longer carbon-carbon (C-C) bonds, as the sp^{3}-bonding of graphane yields longer C-C bonds of 1.52 Å compared to the sp^{2}-bonding of graphene which yields shorter C-C bonds of 1.42 Å. As just established, theoretically if graphane was perfect and everywhere in its stable chair conformer, the lattice would expand; however, the existence of domains where the locally stable twist-boat conformer dominates "contribute to the experimentally observed lattice contraction." When experimentalists have characterized graphane, they have found a distribution of lattice spacings, corresponding to different domains exhibiting different conformers. Any disorder in hydrogenation conformation tends to contract the lattice constant by about 2.0%.

Graphane is an insulator. Chemical functionalization of graphene with hydrogen may be a suitable method to open a band gap in graphene. P-doped graphane is proposed to be a high-temperature BCS theory superconductor with a T_{c} above 90 K.

== Variants ==
Partial hydrogenation leads to hydrogenated graphene rather than (fully hydrogenated) graphane. Such compounds are usually named as "graphane-like" structures. Graphane and graphane-like structures can be formed by electrolytic hydrogenation of graphene or few-layer graphene or high-oriented pyrolytic graphite. In the last case mechanical exfoliation of hydrogenated top layers can be used.

Hydrogenation of graphene on substrate affects only one side, preserving hexagonal symmetry. One-sided hydrogenation of graphene is possible due to the existence of ripplings. Because the latter are distributed randomly, the obtained material is disordered in contrast to two-sided graphane. Annealing allows the hydrogen to disperse, reverting to graphene. Simulations revealed the underlying kinetic mechanism.

== Potential applications ==
p-Doped graphane is postulated to be a high-temperature BCS theory superconductor with a T_{c} above 90 K.

Graphane has been proposed for hydrogen storage. Hydrogenation decreases the dependence of the lattice constant on temperature, which indicates a possible application in precision instruments.

== See also ==
- Nanosheet
