= Binary silicon-hydrogen compounds =

Class of chemical compounds

Chemical structure of disilane, which is structurally similar to ethane.

Silanes are saturated chemical compounds with the empirical formula Si_{x}H_{y}. They are hydrosilanes, a class of compounds that includes compounds with Si−H and other Si−X bonds. All contain tetrahedral silicon and terminal hydrides. They only have Si−H and Si−Si single bonds. The bond lengths are 146.0 pm for a Si−H bond and 233 pm for a Si−Si bond. The structures of the silanes are analogues of the alkanes, starting with silane, SiH_{4}, the analogue of methane, continuing with disilane Si_{2}H_{6}, the analogue of ethane, etc. They are mainly of theoretical or academic interest.

Unsaturated compounds are also known, where silenes have a silicon–silicon double bond and silynes a triple bond, analogous to alkenes and alkynes. Examples include disilene and disilyne. Several constitutional isomers of Si_{6}H_{6} have been analyzed theoretically and been the object of synthetic efforts to compare the nature of the all-silicon silabenzene to benzene and its isomers.

== Inventory ==
Cyclopentasilane is structurally similar to cyclopentane, just larger.

The simplest isomer of a silane is the one in which the silicon atoms are arranged in a single chain with no branches. This isomer is sometimes called the n-isomer (n for "normal", although it is not necessarily the most common). However the chain of silicon atoms may also be branched at one or more silicon atoms. The number of possible isomers increases rapidly with the number of silicon atoms. The members of the series (in terms of number of silicon atoms) follow:

- silane, SiH_{4}, 1 silicon atom and 4 hydrogen atoms, analogous to methane
- disilane, Si_{2}H_{6} or H_{3}Si−SiH_{3}, 2 silicon atoms and 6 hydrogen atoms, analogous to ethane
- trisilane, Si_{3}H_{8} or H_{2}Si(−SiH_{3})_{2}, 3 silicon atoms and 8 hydrogen atoms, analogous to propane
- tetrasilane, Si_{4}H_{10} or H_{3}Si−SiH_{2}−SiH_{2}−SiH_{3}, 4 silicon atoms and 10 hydrogen atoms, analogous to butane (one isomer: isotetrasilane, analogous to isobutane)
- pentasilane, Si_{5}H_{12} or H_{3}Si−SiH_{2}−SiH_{2}−SiH_{2}−SiH_{3}, 5 silicon atoms and 12 hydrogen atoms, analogous to pentane (two isomers: isopentasilane H_{3}Si−SiH_{2}−SiH(−SiH_{3})_{2} and neopentasilane Si(SiH_{3})_{4}, analogous to isopentane and neopentane, respectively)
- hexasilane Si_{6}H_{14} or H_{3}Si−SiH_{2}−SiH_{2}−SiH_{2}−SiH_{2}−SiH_{3}, 6 silicon atoms and 14 hydrogen atoms, analogous to hexane

Silanes are named by adding the suffix -silane to the appropriate numerical multiplier prefix. Hence, disilane, Si_{2}H_{6}; trisilane Si_{3}H_{8}; tetrasilane Si_{4}H_{10}; pentasilane Si_{5}H_{12}; etc. The prefix is generally Greek, with the exceptions of nonasilane which has a Latin prefix, and undecasilane and tridecasilane which have mixed-language prefixes. Solid phase polymeric silicon hydrides called polysilicon hydrides are also known. When hydrogen in a linear polysilene polysilicon hydride is replaced with alkyl or aryl side-groups, the term polysilane is used.

3-Silylhexasilane, H_{3}Si−SiH_{2}−SiH(−SiH_{3})−SiH_{2}−SiH_{2}−SiH_{3}, is the simplest chiral binary noncyclic silicon hydride.

Cyclosilanes also exist. They are structurally analogous to the cycloalkanes, with the formula Si_{n}H_{2n}, n > 2.

Data for small silanes
Silane	Formula	Melting point [°C]	Boiling point [°C]	Density [g cm^{−3}] (at 25 °C)	Appearance
Silane	SiH_{4}	−185	−112		Colorless gas
Disilane	Si_{2}H_{6}	−132	−14		Colorless gas
Trisilane	Si_{3}H_{8}	−117	53	0.743	Colorless liquid
Cyclotrisilane	Si_{3}H_{6}				
Tetrasilane	Si_{4}H_{10}	−90	108	0.793	Colorless liquid
Pentasilane	Si_{5}H_{12}	−72.8	153	0.827	Colorless liquid
Cyclopentasilane	Si_{5}H_{10}	−10.5	194	0.963	Colorless liquid
Hexasilane	Si_{6}H_{14}	−44.7	193.6	0.847	Colorless liquid
Cyclohexasilane	Si_{6}H_{12}	16.5	226		Colorless liquid

== Production ==
Early work was conducted by Alfred Stock and Carl Somiesky. Although monosilane and disilane were already known, Stock and Somiesky discovered, beginning in 1916, the next four members of the Si_{n}H_{2n+2} series, up to n = 6. They also documented the formation of solid phase polymeric silicon hydrides. One of their synthesis methods involved the hydrolysis of metal silicides. This method produces a mixture of silanes, which required separation on a high vacuum line.

The silanes (Si_{n}H_{2n+2}) are less thermally stable than alkanes (C_{n}H_{2n+2}). They tend to undergo dehydrogenation, yielding hydrogen and polysilanes. For this reason, the isolation of silanes higher than heptasilane has proved difficult.

The Schlesinger process is used to prepare silanes by the reaction of perchlorosilanes with lithium aluminium hydride.

== Applications ==
The single but significant application for SiH_{4} is in the microelectronics industry. By metal organic chemical vapor deposition, silane is converted to silicon by thermal decomposition:

SiH_{4} → Si + 2 H_{2}

== Hazards ==
Silane is explosive when mixed with air (1 – 98% SiH_{4}). Other lower silanes can also form explosive mixtures with air. The lighter liquid silanes are highly flammable; this risk increases with the length of the silicon chain.

Considerations for detection/risk control:

- Silane is slightly denser than air, while disilane and trisilane are denser than air, thus there is a possibility of pooling at ground levels/pits.

== Nomenclature ==
The IUPAC nomenclature (systematic way of naming compounds) for silanes is based on identifying hydrosilicon chains. Unbranched, saturated hydrosilicon chains are named systematically with a Greek numerical prefix denoting the number of silicons and the suffix "-silane".

IUPAC naming conventions can be used to produce a systematic name.

The key steps in the naming of more complicated branched silanes are as follows:

- Identify the longest continuous chain of silicon atoms
- Name this longest root chain using standard naming rules
- Name each side chain by changing the suffix of the name of the silane from "-ane" to "-anyl", except for "silane" which becomes "silyl"
- Number the root chain so that the sum of the numbers assigned to each side group will be as low as possible
- Number and name the side chains before the name of the root chain

The nomenclature parallels that of alkyl radicals.

Silanes can also be named like any other inorganic compound; in this naming system, silane is named silicon tetrahydride. However, with longer silanes, this becomes cumbersome.

== See also ==
- Organosilicon compounds, compounds containing carbon–silicon bonds
- Hydrosilanes, a larger class of compounds with the formula H_{m}SiR_{n} (m ≠ 0)
