= Catenation =

Bonding of atoms of the same element into chains or rings

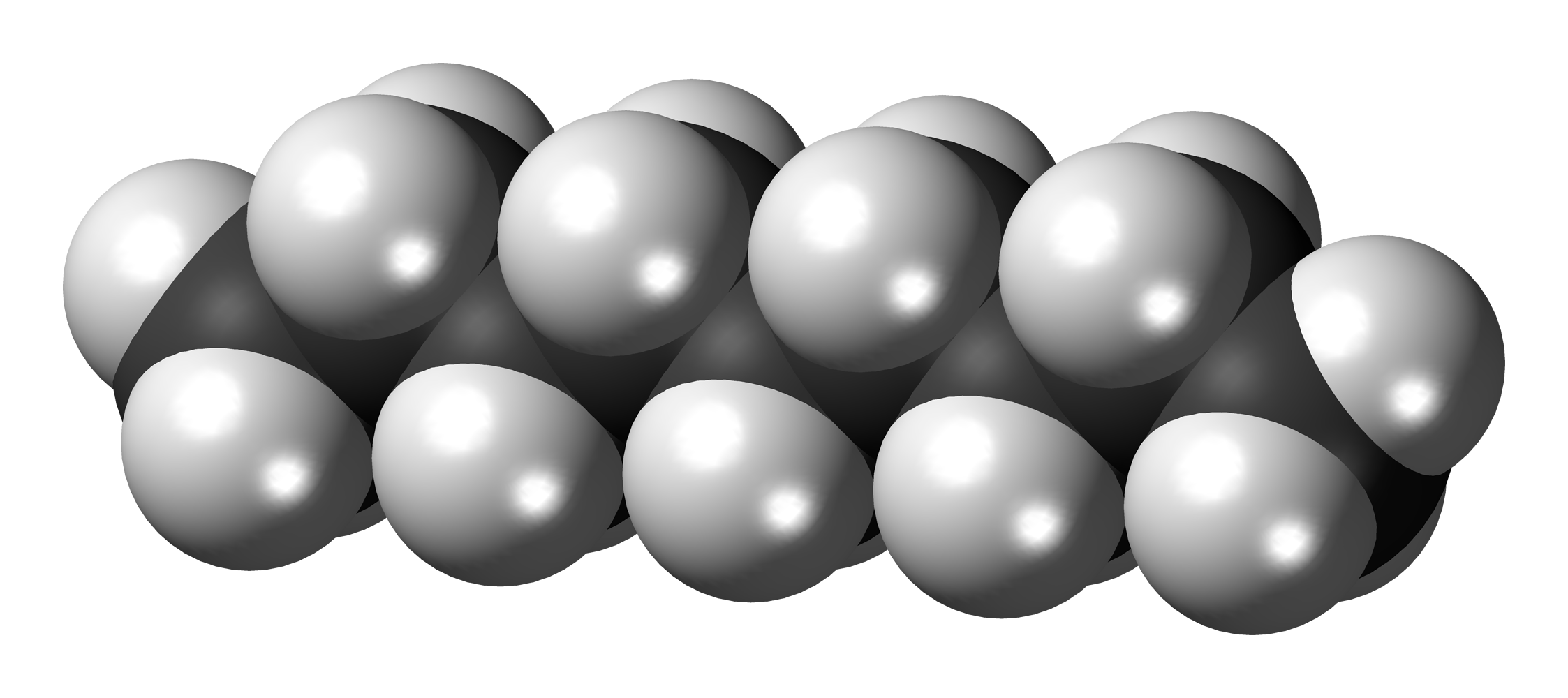
A nonane molecule, consisting of nine carbon atoms in a chain with 20 hydrogen atoms surrounding it

In chemistry, catenation is the bonding of atoms of the same element into a series, called a chain. An open-chain compound is a chain that has free ends whereas a cyclic compound has a closed ring. The words to catenate and catenation reflect the Latin root catena, "chain".

== Carbon ==
Catenation occurs most readily with carbon, which forms covalent bonds with other carbon atoms to form long chains and structures. This is the reason for the presence of the vast number of organic compounds in nature. Carbon is most well known for its properties of catenation, with organic chemistry essentially being the study of catenated carbon structures (and known as catenae). Carbon chains in biochemistry combine any of various other elements, such as hydrogen, oxygen, and biometals, onto the backbone of carbon.

However, carbon is by no means the only element capable of forming such catenae, and several other main-group elements are capable of forming an expansive range of catenae, including hydrogen, boron, silicon, phosphorus, sulfur and halogens.

The ability of an element to catenate is primarily based on the bond energy of the element to itself, which decreases with more diffuse orbitals (those with higher azimuthal quantum number) overlapping to form the bond. Hence, carbon, with the least diffuse valence shell p orbital is capable of forming longer p-p sigma bonded chains of atoms than heavier elements which bond via higher valence shell orbitals. Catenation ability is also influenced by a range of steric and electronic factors, including the electronegativity of the element in question, the molecular orbital n and the ability to form different kinds of covalent bonds. For carbon, the sigma overlap between adjacent atoms is sufficiently strong that perfectly stable chains can be formed. With other elements this was once thought to be extremely difficult in spite of plenty of evidence to the contrary.

== Hydrogen ==
Theories of the structure of water involve three-dimensional networks of tetrahedra and chains and rings, linked via hydrogen bonding.

A polycatenated network, with rings formed from metal-templated hemispheres linked by hydrogen bonds, was reported in 2008.

In organic chemistry, hydrogen bonding is known to facilitate the formation of chain structures. For example, Camphor C_{10}H_{16}O shows catenated hydrogen bonding between the hydroxyl groups, leading to the formation of helical chains; crystalline isophthalic acid C_{8}H_{6}O_{4} is built up from molecules connected by hydrogen bonds, forming infinite chains.

In unusual conditions, a 1-dimensional series of hydrogen molecules confined within a single wall carbon nanotube is expected to become metallic at a relatively low pressure of 163.5 GPa. This is about 40% of the ~400 GPa thought to be required to metallize ordinary hydrogen, a pressure which is difficult to access experimentally.

== Silicon ==
Silicon can form sigma bonds to other silicon atoms (and disilane is the parent of this class of compounds). However, it is difficult to prepare and isolate Si_{n}H_{2n+2} (analogous to the saturated alkane hydrocarbons) with n greater than about 8, as their thermal stability decreases with increases in the number of silicon atoms. Silanes higher in molecular weight than disilane decompose to polymeric polysilicon hydride and hydrogen. But with a suitable pair of organic and inorganic substituents in place of hydrogen on each silicon it is possible to prepare polysilanes (sometimes, erroneously called polysilenes) that are analogues of alkanes. These long chain compounds have surprising electronic properties - high electrical conductivity, for example - arising from sigma delocalization of the electrons in the chain.

Even silicon–silicon pi bonds are possible. However, these bonds are less stable than the carbon analogues. Disilane and longer silanes are quite reactive compared to alkanes. Disilene and disilynes are quite rare, unlike alkenes and alkynes. Examples of disilynes, long thought to be too unstable to be isolated were reported in 2004.

== Boron ==
In dodecaborate(12) anion, twelve boron atoms covalently link to each other to form an icosahedral structure. Various other similar motifs are also well studied, such as boranes, carboranes and metal dicarbollides.

== Nitrogen ==
Nitrogen, unlike its neighbor carbon, is much less likely to form chains that are stable at room temperature. But, there do exist nitrogen chains; for example, in solid nitrogen, triazane, azide anion and triazoles. Longer series with eight or more nitrogen atoms, such as 1,1'-Azobis-1,2,3-triazole, have been synthesized. These compounds have potential use as a convenient way to store large amount of energy.

== Phosphorus ==
Phosphorus chains (with organic substituents) have been prepared, although these tend to be quite fragile. Small rings or clusters are more common.

== Sulfur ==
The versatile chemistry of elemental sulfur is largely due to catenation. In the native state, sulfur exists as S_{8} molecules. On heating these rings open and link together giving rise to increasingly long chains, as evidenced by the progressive increase in viscosity as the chains lengthen. Also, sulfur polycations, sulfur polyanions (polysulfides) and lower sulfur oxides are all known. Furthermore, selenium and tellurium show variants of these structural motifs.

== Semimetallic elements ==
In recent years, a variety of double and triple bonds between semi-metallic elements have been reported, including silicon, germanium, arsenic and bismuth. The ability of certain main group elements to catenate is currently the subject of research into inorganic polymers.

== Halogens ==
Except for fluorine that can only form unstable polyfluorides at low temperature, all other stable halogens (Cl, Br, I) can form several isopolyhalogen anions that are stable at room temperature, of which the most prominent example being triiodide. In all these anions, the halogen atoms of the same element bond to each other.

== See also ==
- Backbone chain
- Chain-growth polymerization
- Macromolecule
- Aromaticity
- Polyhalogen ions
- Polysulfides
- Superatom
- Inorganic polymer
- Self-assembly
