= Silenes =

Silicon compounds with an Si=Si bond

Structure of disilene, the simplest silene

In inorganic chemistry, silenes, or disilalkenes, are silicon compounds that contain Si=Si double bonds, where the oxidation state of Si is +2. The parent molecule is disilene, Si_{2}H_{4}.

== Structure ==
The first transient disilene was reported in 1972 by D. N. Roark and Garry J. D. Peddle. Simple disilenes easily polymerize. To suppress this tendency, bulky substituents are used. Indeed the first isolable disilene, tetramesityldisilene, was described in 1981 by West, Fink, and Michl. It was prepared by UV-photolysis of the related cyclic trisilane:

2 [Si(mesityl)_{2}]_{3} → 3 (mesityl)_{2}Si=Si(mesityl)_{2}

== Structure of tetramesityldisilene ==
Tetramesityldisilene (C_{6}H_{2}(CH_{3})_{3})_{2}Si=Si(C_{6}H_{2}(CH_{3})_{3})_{2} is a yellow-orange solid. The Si=Si double bond lengths of disilenes vary between 2.14 and 2.29 Å and are nearly 5 to 10% shorter than the Si-Si single bond lengths of corresponding disilanes. A peculiarity of disilenes is the trans-bending of the substituents, which is never observed in alkenes. The trans-bent angles of disilenes between the R_{2}Si planes and the Si=Si vector range from 0 to 33.8 °. This distortion is rationalized by the stability of the corresponding silylene fragments, although disilenes do not typically dissociate.

The distorted geometry of disilenes can be rationalized by considering the valence orbitals of silicon, which are 3s and 3p, whereas those of carbon are 2s and 2p. Thus, the energy gap between the ns and np orbitals of a silicon atom is larger than that of a carbon atom. Therefore, silylene fragments are in a singlet state, while carbene fragments are in a triplet state. So, when double bonds are formed by the interaction of these two fragments, disilenes which consist of two silylene units are trans-bending and alkenes which consist of two carbene units are planar. The bending is even more extreme for the tin analogues of disilenes.

== Synthesis ==
Disilenes are generally synthesized by reduction of 1,2-dihalodisilane, by retro-Diels–Alder fragmentation, by dimerization of silylenes, by photofragmentation of cyclopolysilanes, or by rearrangement of silylsilylenes.

A series of 1,1,1,4,4,4-hexaalkyl-2,3-bis(trialkylsilyl)tetrasil-2-enes structural analogues are typically synthesised using reductive coupling of the corresponding 1,1,1,3,3,3-hexaalkyl-2,3-tribromotrisilanes.

== IUPAC names ==
To form the root of the IUPAC names for silenes, simply change the -an- infix of the parent to -en-. For example, SiH_{3}-SiH_{3} is the silane disilANe. The name of SiH_{2}=SiH_{2} is therefore disilENe.

In higher silenes, where isomers exist that differ in location of the double bond, the following numbering system is used:

1. Number the longest silicon chain that contains the double bond in the direction that gives the silicon atoms of the double bond the lowest possible numbers.
2. Indicate the location of the double bond by the location of its first silicon.
3. Name branched or substituted silenes in a manner similar to silanes.
4. Number the silicon atoms, locate and name substituent groups, locate the double bond, and name the main chain.

== See also ==
- Disilane
- Disilyne
- Organosilicon chemistry
- Double bond rule
- Trisilaallene
