= Flexible solar cell research =

Field of research

Flexible solar cell research is a research-level technology, an example of which was created at the Massachusetts Institute of Technology in which solar cells are manufactured by depositing photovoltaic material on flexible substrates, such as ordinary paper, using chemical vapor deposition technology.

== Printable Solar Cells ==
The technology for manufacturing solar cells on paper was developed by a group of researchers from the Massachusetts Institute of Technology with support from the National Science Foundation and the Eni-MIT Alliance Solar Frontiers Program.

=== Features ===
Researchers at MIT developed a method for printing solar cells on fabrics or paper substrates. Circuits of organic photovoltaic materials are deposited in five layers on ordinary paper substrates in a vacuum chamber. It is done by coating conformal conductive polymer electrodes with oxidative chemical vapor, a process known as chemical vapor deposition. Such solar panels are capable of producing voltages exceeding than 50V, which in turn can power appliances at normal lighting conditions. The solar cell is also shown to be flexible. The solar cell conductive grid is similar to an inkjet photo printout with patterned rectangles. When leads are attached to the electrical substrate, it is shown to power electrical appliances. The cost of "printing" (as MIT describes it) is claimed to be similar to that of inkjet photo printing. This technology uses vapor deposition temperatures of less than 120°C, which makes it easier to manufacture on ordinary paper. The current efficiency of the panel is near 1%, which the researcher hopes to improve in the near future.

As paper costs approximately a thousandth of glass, solar cells using printing processes can be much cheaper than conventional solar panels. Also other methods involving coating papers with materials include first coating the paper with a smooth material to counter-act the molecular scale roughness of paper. But in this method, the photovoltaic material can be coated directly onto untreated paper.

=== Testing ===
The circuit was also tested by depositing the photovoltaic materials on a polyethylene terephthalate (PET) substrate. The PET sheet was folded and unfolded 1000 times and no overt deterioration in performance was observed, whereas common photovoltaic materials deposited on PET deteriorated with just a single fold. The solar cell was also passed through a laser printer to demonstrate its continued performance after exposure to [somewhat] high temperatures and it still retained its characteristics after the procedure.

== Foldable Silicon Wafers ==
=== Overview ===
Crystalline silicon (c-Si) is an extremely popular semiconductor made into wafers, which are then used in the manufacturing of 95% of the world’s photovoltaics. Due to its prevalence in the solar cell industry, it would appear to be an ideal substrate for flexible solar cells. Unfortunately, c-Si is brittle, and while some researchers have made solar cells from amorphous silicon that are flexible, these cells have some major drawbacks such as bad performance and unstable operating conditions.

=== Fabrication ===
Recent research breakthroughs have yielded a method of engineering foldable c-Si wafers. The first step is saw-damage removal, which uses an acidic solution to etch the surface of the wafers. This thins the wafers and textures the surface to form random pyramids, which increases flexibility and reduces the surface reflection of the normally glossy wafer, thereby increasing the efficiency of the solar cell. To minimize cracking, researchers have blunted the valleys between pyramids along the edges of the wafer with a hydrogen fluoride(HF) solution to round out the valleys and make them less sharp. Chemical vapor deposition was used to deposit layers of Si:H on both sides of the wafer, and circuitry was screen printed on the devices and glued down with silver paste. The sides of the cells that were expected to be exposed to sunlight coated with an anti-reflective layer to improve light-harvesting efficiency.

=== Mechanical Behavior ===
When bending forces were applied to the textured wafer, both COMSOL simulations and in situ transmission electron microscopy(TEM) images showed that cracking began in the valleys between the pyramids. Upon blunting the valleys, a three-point bending test showed that the vertical displacement of the wafer was increased and the critical bending radius at the cracking moment decreased from approx 74%. This improvement in flexibility was verified by atomistic simulations, where an untreated wafer exhibited cracking under a 9.3% loading strain, and the treated wafers lasted until 17.3%.

Closer analysis of the morphology of the blunted wafers using a stepwise focused ion beam(FIB) showed that the fracture surface had many cleavage sites and microcracks, which propagated down to a critical depth below the surface. Below this depth, secondary shear banding lines spread in tangential directions from the original cracks. These features show the complex stress state during the cracking process, wherein the initial cleaving consumed a greater amount of energy before visible cracks formed along the surface.

TEM images of blunted and traditional wafers showed lattice strain features below the fracture surface. Lattice distortions caused the strains, meaning that residual features were preserved within the atomic layers and could be used as an indicator of the cracking mode. Geometric phase analysis showed that normal wafers exhibited x-direction tensile strain and y-direction compressive and dilation strain, corresponding to typical brittle fracture. The blunted wafer had larger strain variations in both directions as well as larger dilation strain. Overall, these features show larger lattice expansion and that blunting the wafers mitigated the brittle characteristics of c-Si.

=== Testing ===
The flexible cell exhibited an efficiency of 24.5%. To test its performance, the cell was folded corner to corner 1,000 times and held for at least 10 seconds. After the cycles completed, 100% of the initial performance values were retained. Other tests include simulated wind blowing and extreme temperature exposure. In these tests the solar cells exhibited negligible power loss, showing that they could still work despite negative external factors.

== Advantages ==
In conventional solar panels, the supporting structures of the panel like glass, brackets etc. are mostly twice as costly as the photovoltaic materials manufactured on them. Alternative solutions and creative solar cell substrates can mitigate these costs.

== Applications ==
If such solar cells can achieve sufficient technological maturity, they can be used as wall paper and window shades for producing electricity from room lighting. They can also be manufactured on clothing, which can in turn be used to charge portable electronic devices like mobile phones and media players.

Flexible solar modules can be used on curved roofs, or roofs where it does not make sense to install a rack mounting system. Additionally, they can be installed on walls of buildings to make solar a viable option in areas where land or rooftops are not able to have solar installed.

== Disadvantages ==
In order to last 20+ years outdoors exposed to the elements, such solar cells must be finished with a front sheet of a UV-resistant fluoropolymer or thermoplastic olefin rather than the glass used in conventional solar cells, which is comparatively inexpensive. Solar cells must be sealed so water and oxygen cannot enter and destroy the cells via oxidative degradation.

== See also ==
- Thin film solar cell
- Organic solar cell
- Sun-free photovoltaics
- Polarizing organic photovoltaics
