= Tetrasilane =

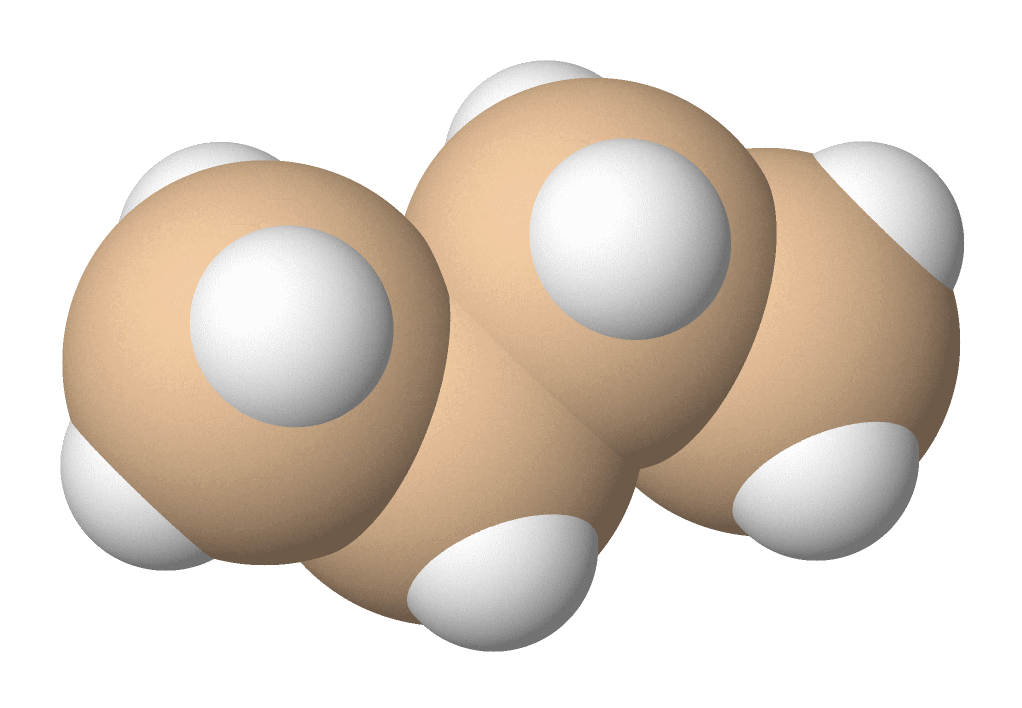

Names
- IUPAC name Tetrasilane
- Other names n-Tetrasilane

Identifiers
CAS Number	7783-29-1
3D model (JSmol)	Interactive image
ChemSpider	122662
ECHA InfoCard	100.132.456
EC Number	616-515-4
PubChem CID	6327668
UNII	OI9DXJ0BL4
CompTox Dashboard (EPA)	DTXSID30999039
- InChI: InChI=1S/H10Si4/c1-3-4-2/h3-4H2,1-2H3 Key: MBDFFBCLMHNNID-UHFFFAOYSA-N
- SMILES: [SiH3][SiH2][SiH2][SiH3]

Properties
Chemical formula	H_{10}Si_{4}
Molar mass	122.420 g·mol^{−1}
Appearance	colourless liquid that self ignite in air
Density	0.792 g·cm^{−3}
Melting point	−89.9 °C
Boiling point	108.1 °C
Solubility in water	reacts

Hazards
- GHS labelling
Pictograms	(GHS02: Flammable)
Signal word	Danger
Hazard statements	H250

Related compounds
Related compounds	butane
- Except where otherwise noted, data are given for materials in their standard state (at 25 °C [77 °F], 100 kPa). Infobox references

Tetrasilane is a silane with the structure formula SiH_{3}–(SiH_{2})_{2}–SiH_{3}. It is the silane analog of butane.

== Preparation ==
Tetrasilane can be prepared by reacting magnesium silicide (Mg_{2}Si) with acids like 20% phosphoric acid in 50–60 °C.

Mg_{2}Si + 4 H^{+} → Si_{n}H_{2n+2}

The reaction can produce silanes up to n=15. The reaction of magnesium silicide with 25% hydrochloric acid produces 40% monosilane, 30% disilane, 15% trisilane, 10% tetrasilane and 5% higher silanes. The mixture can be separated by fractional distillation.

In addition, higher silanes can also be obtained by discharges monosilane:

SiH_{4} → SiH_{2} + H_{2}
SiH_{2} + SiH_{4} → H_{3}Si−SiH_{3}
SiH_{2} + H_{3}Si−SiH_{3} → H_{3}Si−SiH_{2}−SiH_{3}
SiH_{2} + H_{3}Si−SiH_{2}−SiH_{3} → H_{3}Si−SiH_{2}−SiH_{2}−SiH_{3}

== Properties ==
Tetrasilane is a colourless, pyrophoric liquid that has a disgusting odour. Even below 54 °C, it will still spontaneously combust. It is even more unstable than trisilane, slowly decomposing at room temperature, releasing hydrogen and forming shorter chain silanes.

== Reactions ==
Photochemical disproportionation of tetrasilane will produce 3-silylpentasilane and disilane.

2 Si_{4}H_{10} → Si_{2}H_{6} + H_{3}Si−SiH(Si_{2}H_{6})_{2}

With the presence of aluminium chloride, heating tetrasilane in xylene will allow isomerization to isotetrasilane.

2 H_{3}Si−SiH_{2}−SiH_{2}−SiH_{3} → H_{3}Si−SiH(SiH_{3})_{2}

== See also ==
- Binary silicon-hydrogen compounds
