= Polysilicon hydride =

Solid polymers of only silicon and hydrogen

Polysilicon hydrides are polymers containing only silicon and hydrogen. They have the formula $\ce{(SiH_{n})_{x}}$ where 0.2 ≤ n ≤ 2.5 and x is the number of monomer units. The polysilicon hydrides are generally colorless or pale-yellow/ocher powders that are easily hydrolyzed and ignite readily in air. The surfaces of silicon prepared by MOCVD using silane (SiH_{4}) consist of a polysilicon hydride.

== Synthesis ==
Polysilicon hydrides are much less thermally stable than the corresponding alkanes (C_{n}H_{2n+2}). They are kinetically labile, with their decomposition reaction rate increasing with increases in the number of silicon atoms in the molecule. Consequently, the preparation and isolation of polysilicon hydrides is difficult for species containing more than a few silicon atoms. Greater catenation of the Si atoms can be obtained with the halides (Si_{n}X_{2n+2} with n = 14) for the fluorides. Thus the polymeric silicon hydrides are formed along with smaller silicon hydride oligomers and hydrogen gas from the spontaneous but slow decomposition, as well as from the accelerated thermolysis, of acyclic and cyclic liquid silanes that are higher in molecular weight than monosilane (SiH_{4}) and disilane (Si_{2}H_{6}). Polysilicon hydrides are intermediates in the high-temperature conversion of mono- and disilane to silicon and hydrogen gas. In the following idealized sequence cyclopentasilane is the polysilicon hydride intermediate:

5 SiH_{4} → Si_{5}H_{10} + 5 H_{2}
Si_{5}H_{10} → 5 Si + 5H_{2}

Polymeric silicon hydrides may be prepared by hydrolysis of certain silicides. Acid hydrolysis of calcium monosilicide (CaSi) produces (SiH_{2})_{x}. CaSi consists of zigzag silicon chain with the formula (Si^{2−})_{n}. This chain is preserved in the hydrolysis. This reaction was reported in 1921 by the German chemists Lothar Woehler (1870–1952) and Friedrich Mueller.

In 1923, German chemists Alfred Stock (1876–1946) and Friedrich Zeidler (1855–1931) found the (SiH)_{x} polymer is formed along with silane gas by the action of sodium amalgam on dichlorosilane (SiH_{2}Cl_{2}). The reaction is proposed to first produce the disodium dihydrogen silanide (Na_{2}SiH_{2}) via a Wurtz-like reaction. The Na_{2}SiH_{2} dissolves in the mercury to generate the diradical SiH_{2}, which then forms the final products.

Polysilicon hydrides may also be produced by the dehalogenation of polysilicon halides. An illustrative reaction is the debromination of HSiBr_{3} with Mg in ether:

HSiBr_{3} + 3/2 Mg → 1/x (SiH)_{x} + 3/2 MgBr_{2}

== Macromolecular structure ==
When n = 2 in (SiH_{n})_{x}, the polymer is termed polysilene, which has a quasi-one-dimensional (zigzag) chain structure in which each silicon atom is bonded to two other silicon skeletal atoms and two hydrogen atoms. Thus the Si atom is tetravalent (has four bonds). If n = 1, quasi-two-dimensional (corrugated sheets) or random three-dimensional silicon networks termed polysilynes are obtained in which each silicon atom is bonded to three other silicon skeletal atoms and one hydrogen atom giving, again, a tetravalent Si atom. In the polysilenes and the polysilynes, the backbone is made exclusively of silicon atoms; the pendent- or side-groups, are not shared between skeletal atoms of the backbone chain.

Top: chain structure, middle: sheet structure, bottom: three-dimensional irregular structure.

Compression of silane itself under extremely high pressures (> 90 GPa) for long periods of time (~8 months) produces a material that differs from those shown above in that the silicon atoms are not bonded to one another but, rather, are connected via bridging hydrogen atoms. The silicon atoms are 8-fold coordinated by hydrogen (i.e. each silicon atom is bonded to 8 hydrogen atoms) forming a tetragonal structure.

== Inorganic derivatives – siloxene ==
In addition to the polysilicon halides, another related compound, in which the hydrogen is partially replaced by an inorganic group, is siloxene. Siloxene was first observed before the polysilicon hydrides, but it was initially thought to be a polymeric silicon hydride itself. Siloxene is structurally derived from layered polysilyne by replacing one-half of the hydrogen atoms with OH groups. It has the chemical formula Si_{2}H_{2}O (or [Si_{6}H_{3}(OH)_{3}]_{x}) and it is prepared by reacting calcium disilicide (CaSi_{2}), which has a puckered layer of silicon atoms, with dilute hydrochloric acid. This yellow solid was prepared from that route as early as 1900 by Charles Schenck Bradley (1853–1929), a one-time associate of Thomas Edison. However, its structure, the intra-polymer Si-Si bond order, and true chemical formula were not determined for some time afterwards Bradley had erroneously concluded it was the silicon analog, (Si_{2}H_{2})_{x}, of the unsaturated (double-bond containing) polymer Polyacetylene and referred to as silico-acetylene.

== Organic derivatives – polysilanes and polysilynes ==
When hydrogen atoms in linear polysilene are replaced with organic substituents, particularly alkyl and aryl groups, polysilanes are obtained. Although organosilicon polymers can be considered structural derivatives of polysilicon hydrides, they are not synthesized directly from them. Traditionally, polysilanes are prepared by the Wurtz-like sodium or potassium metal-mediated reductive coupling (dehalogenation) of dihaloorganosilanes (R_{2}SiX_{2}) in an inert solvent (e.g. toluene), very much like Burkhard's original method. Polysilynes have been similarly prepared from trihaloorganosilanes (RSiX_{3}).

== See also ==
- Polysilicon halides
