= Polysilicon halide =

Polymeric solid with silicon backbone

Polysilicon halides are silicon-backbone polymeric solids. At room temperature, the polysilicon fluorides are colorless to yellow solids while the chlorides, bromides, and iodides are, respectively, yellow, amber, and red-orange. Polysilicon dihalides (perhalo-polysilenes) have the general formula (SiX_{2})_{n} while the polysilicon monohalides (perhalo-polysilynes) have the formula (SiX)_{n}, where X is F, Cl, Br, or I and n is the number of monomer units in the polymer.

== Macromolecular structure ==
The polysilicon halides can be considered structural derivatives of the polysilicon hydrides, in which the side-group hydrogen atoms are substituted with halogen atoms. In the monomeric silicon dihalide (a.k.a. dihalo-silylene and dihalosilene) molecule, which is analogous to carbene molecules, the silicon atom is divalent (forms two bonds). By contrast, in both the polysilicon dihalides and the polysilicon monohalides, as well as the polysilicon hydrides, the silicon atom is tetravalent with a local coordination geometry that is tetrahedral, even though the stoichiometry of the monohalides ([SiX]_{n} = Si_{n}X_{n}) might erroneously imply a structural analogy between perhalopolysilynes and [linear] polyacetylenes with the similar formula (C_{2}H_{2})_{n}. The carbon atoms in the polyacetylene polymer are sp^{2}-hybridized and thus have a local coordination geometry that is trigonal planar. However, this is not observed in the polysilicon halides or hydrides because the Si=Si double bond in disilene compounds are much more reactive than C=C double bonds. Only when the substituent groups on silicon are very large are disilene compounds kinetically non-labile.

== Synthesis ==
The first indication that the reaction of SiX_{4} and Si yields a higher halide Si_{n}X_{2n+2} (n > 1) was in 1871 for the comproportionation reaction of SiCl_{4} vapor and Si at white heat to give Si_{2}Cl_{6}. This was discovered by the French chemists Louis Joseph Troost (1825 - 1911) and Paul Hautefeuille (1836–1902). Since that time, it has been shown that gaseous silicon dihalide molecules (SiX_{2}) are formed as intermediates in the Si/SiX_{4} reactions. The silicon dihalide gas molecules can be condensed at low temperatures. For example, if the gaseous SiF_{2} (difluorosilylene) produced from SiF_{4} (g) and Si (s) at 1100-1400°C is condensed at temperatures below -80°C and subsequently allowed to warm to room temperature, (SiF_{2})_{n} is obtained. That reaction was first observed by Donald C. Pease, a DuPont scientist in 1958. The polymerization is believed to occur via paramagnetic di-radical oligomeric intermediates like Si_{2}F_{4} (•SiF_{2}-F_{2}Si•) and Si_{3}F_{6} (•SiF_{2}-SiF_{2}-F_{2}Si•),

The polysilicon dihalides also form from the thermally-induced disproportionation of perhalosilanes (according to: x Si_{n}X_{2n+2} → x SiX_{4} + (n-1) (SiX_{2})_{x} where n ≥ 2). For example, SiCl_{4} and Si forms Si_{n}Cl_{2n} cyclic oligomers (with n = 12-16) at 900-1200°C. Under conditions of high vacuum and fast pumping, SiCl_{2} may be isolated by rapidly quenching the reaction products or, under less stringent vacuum conditions, (SiCl_{2})_{n} polymer is deposited just beyond the hot zone while the perchlorosilanes Si_{n}Cl_{2n+2} are trapped farther downstream. The infrared multiphoton dissociation of trichlorosilane (HSiCl_{3}) also yields polysilicon dichloride, (SiCl_{2})_{n}, along with HCl. SiBr_{4} and SiI_{4} react with Si at high temperatures to produce SiBr_{2} and SiI_{2}, which polymerize on quenching.

== Reactivity ==
The polysilicon dihalides are generally stable under vacuum up to about 150-200°C, after which they decompose to perhalosilanes, Si_{n}X_{2n+2} (where n = 1 to 14), and to polysilicon monohalides. However, they are sensitive to air and moisture. Polysilicon difluoride is more reactive than the heavier polysilicon dihalides. In stark contrast to its carbon analog, polytetrafluoroethylene, (SiF_{2})_{n} ignites spontaneously in air, whereas (SiCl_{2})_{n} inflames in dry air only when heated to 150°C. The halogen atoms in polysilicon dihalides can be substituted with organic groups. For example, (SiCl_{2})_{n} undergoes substitution by alcohols to give poly(dialkoxysilylene)s. The polysilicon monohalides are all stable to 400°C, but are also water and air sensitive. Polysilicon monofluoride reacts more vigorously than the heavier polysilicon monohalides. For example, (SiF)_{n} decomposes [to SiF_{4} and Si] above 400°C explosively.

== See also ==
- Polysilicon hydride
