= Cyclohexasilane =

Names
- Other names: Hexasilinane; cyclo-Hexasilane

Identifiers
CAS Number	291-59-8
3D model (JSmol)	Interactive image
ChemSpider	10788414
ECHA InfoCard	100.245.594
EC Number	813-812-2
PubChem CID	457782
CompTox Dashboard (EPA)	DTXSID40760676
- InChI: InChI=1S/H12Si6/c1-2-4-6-5-3-1/h1-6H2 Key: GCOJIFYUTTYXOF-UHFFFAOYSA-N
- SMILES: [SiH2]1[SiH2][SiH2][SiH2][SiH2][SiH2]1

Properties
Chemical formula	Si_{6}H_{12}
Molar mass	180.606 g·mol^{-1}
Appearance	colorless liquid
Melting point	16.5 °C (61.7 °F; 289.6 K)
Boiling point	226 °C (439 °F; 499 K)
Solubility in water	reacts with water
- Except where otherwise noted, data are given for materials in their standard state (at 25 °C [77 °F], 100 kPa). Infobox references

Cyclohexasilane is a binary inorganic compound of silicon and hydrogen with the chemical formula Si_{6}H_{12}.

== Synthesis ==
Reaction of lithium tetrahydroaluminate and hexasilicon dodecachloride:

Si_{6}Cl_{12} + 3LiAlH_{4} → Si_{6}H_{12} + 3LiCl + 3AlCl_{3}

Also, pyrolysis of monosilane and disilane by heating at low pressure followed by fractional distillation.

== Physical properties ==
Cyclohexasilane forms a colorless liquid that reacts with water.

The compound is soluble in ethanol and carbon disulfide.

== Uses ==
Cyclohexasilane is an important precursor for the deposition of silicon layers from liquid silicon inks in the semiconductor industry.
