= Trisilane =

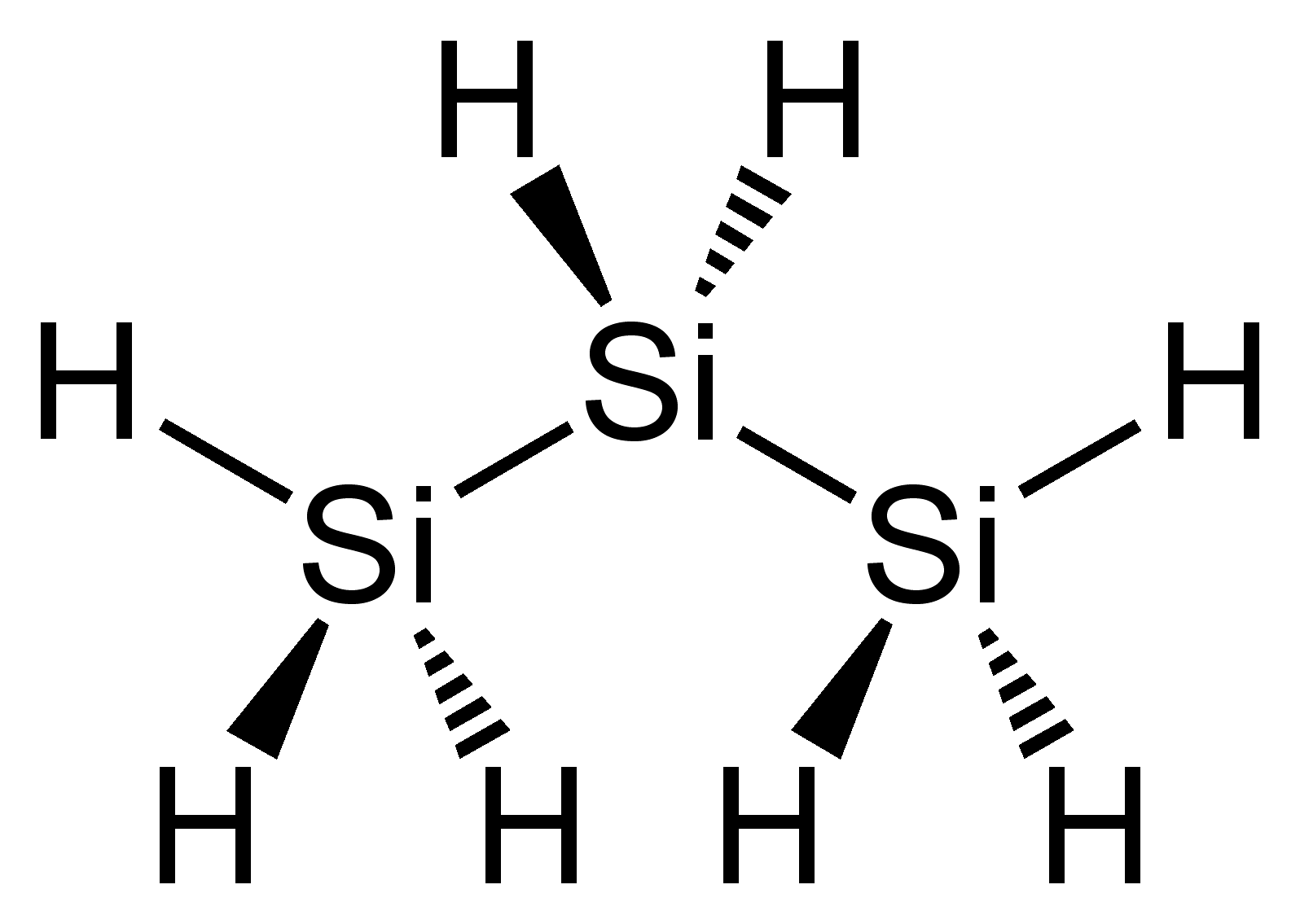
Stereo structural formula of trisilane with implicit hydrogens
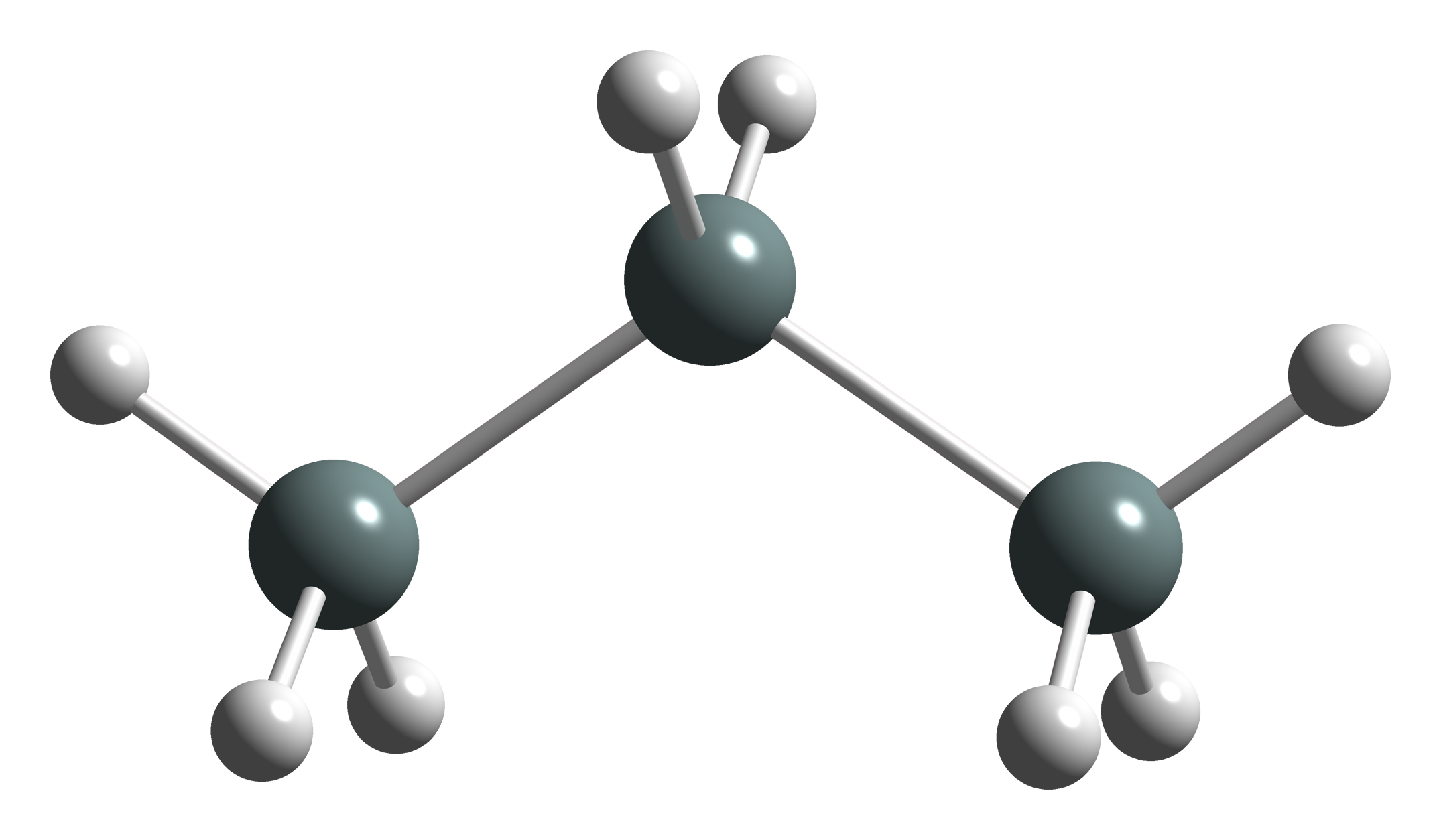
Ball and stick model of trisilane

Names
- IUPAC name Trisilane

Identifiers
CAS Number	7783-26-8
3D model (JSmol)	Interactive image
ChemSpider	122661
ECHA InfoCard	100.132.113
EC Number	616-514-9
PubChem CID	139070
UNII	1T3A75Z4ZL
UN number	3194
CompTox Dashboard (EPA)	DTXSID80884426
- InChI: InChI=1S/H8Si3/c1-3-2/h3H2,1-2H3 Key: VEDJZFSRVVQBIL-UHFFFAOYSA-N
- SMILES: [SiH3][SiH2][SiH3]

Properties
Chemical formula	H_{8}Si_{3}
Molar mass	92.319 g·mol^{−1}
Appearance	Colourless liquid
Odor	Unpleasant
Density	0.743 g cm^{−3}
Melting point	−117 °C (−179 °F; 156 K)
Boiling point	53 °C (127 °F; 326 K)
Solubility in water	Slowly decomposes
Vapor pressure	12.7 kPa

Hazards
- Occupational safety and health (OHS/OSH)
Main hazards	Pyrophoric
- GHS labelling
Pictograms	(GHS02: Flammable) (GHS07: Exclamation mark)
Signal word	Danger
Hazard statements	H250, H261, H315, H319, H335
Precautionary statements	P210, P222, P231+P232, P261, P264, P271, P280, P302+P334, P302+P352, P304+P340, P305+P351+P338, P312, P321, P332+P313, P337+P313, P362, P370+P378, P402+P404, P403+P233, P405, P422, P501
Flash point	< −40 °C (−40 °F; 233 K)
Autoignition temperature	< 50 °C (122 °F; 323 K)

Related compounds
Related hydrosilicons	Disilane; Disilyne; Silane; Silylene
Related compounds	Propane
- Except where otherwise noted, data are given for materials in their standard state (at 25 °C [77 °F], 100 kPa). Infobox references

Trisilane is the silane with the formula H_{2}Si(SiH_{3})_{2}. A liquid at standard temperature and pressure, it is a silicon analogue of propane. In contrast with propane, however, trisilane ignites spontaneously in air.

== Synthesis ==
Trisilane was characterized by Alfred Stock having prepared it by the reaction of hydrochloric acid and magnesium silicide. This reaction had been explored as early as 1857 by Friedrich Woehler and Heinrich Buff, and further investigated by Henri Moissan and Samuel Smiles in 1902.

== Decomposition ==
The key property of trisilane is its thermal lability. It degrades to silicon films and SiH_{4} according to this idealized equation:

Si_{3}H_{8} → Si + 2 SiH_{4}

In terms of mechanism, this decomposition proceeds by a 1,2 hydrogen shift that produces disilanes, normal and isotetrasilanes, and normal and isopentasilanes.

Because it readily decomposes to leave films of Si, trisilane has been explored a means to apply thin layers of silicon for semiconductors and similar applications. Similarly, thermolysis of trisilane gives silicon nanowires.

== See also ==
- Tetrasilane
