= Trisilaallene =

Class of silicon chemical compounds

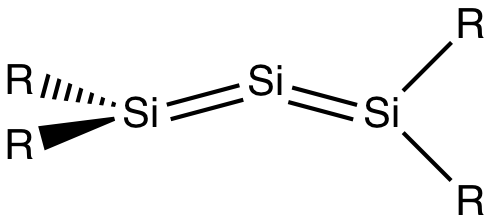
The generic formula of trisilaallene

Trisilaallene is a subclass of silenes derivatives where a central silicon atom forms double bonds with each of two terminal silicon atoms, with the generic formula R_{2}Si=Si=SiR_{2}. Trisilaallene is a silicon-based analog of an allene, but their chemical properties are markedly different.

== Synthesis ==
The first isolable trisilaallene compound was reported by Kira et al. in 2003, synthesized by reductive dehalogenation of tetrachlorosilane using potassium graphite. This tetraalkyl-substituted trisilallene showed thermal stability up to its melting point around 200 °C, but decomposed in contact with air. Its remarkable stability is attributable to bulky substituents providing kinetic protection at the terminal silicon atoms. The ^{29}Si-NMR shifts of the central silicon and terminal silicon atoms were observed at 157.0 ppm and 196.9 ppm respectively. Two Si=Si bond lengths were determined to be 2.177 Å and 2.188 Å by X-ray crystallography, which are within the typical range of Si=Si double bonds.

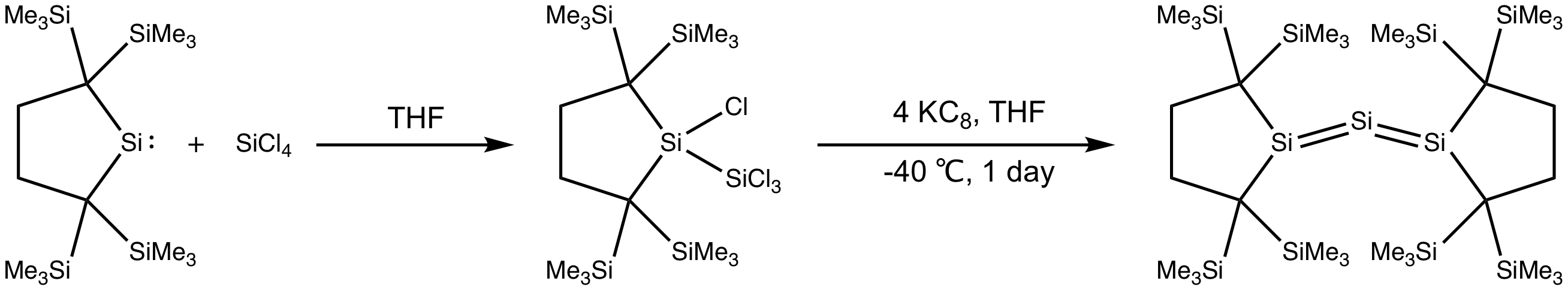

Sekiguchi et al. synthesized a silyl-substituted trisilaallene from a reaction between a N-heterocyclic carbene (NHC) adduct of SiCl_{2} and 1,1-dilithiosilane (t-Bu_{2}MeSi)_{2}SiLi_{2}. Although crystallographic analysis of the product was not successful, the formation of trisilaallene was confirmed by ^{1}H-, ^{13}C-, and ^{29}Si-NMR spectroscopy, high-resolution mass spectrometry (HRMS), and reactivity study. The low electronegativity of silyl substituents compared to alkyl substituents resulted in a more upfield ^{29}Si-NMR shift for the terminal silicon atoms (44.6 ppm) and a downfield shift for the central atom (418.5 ppm).

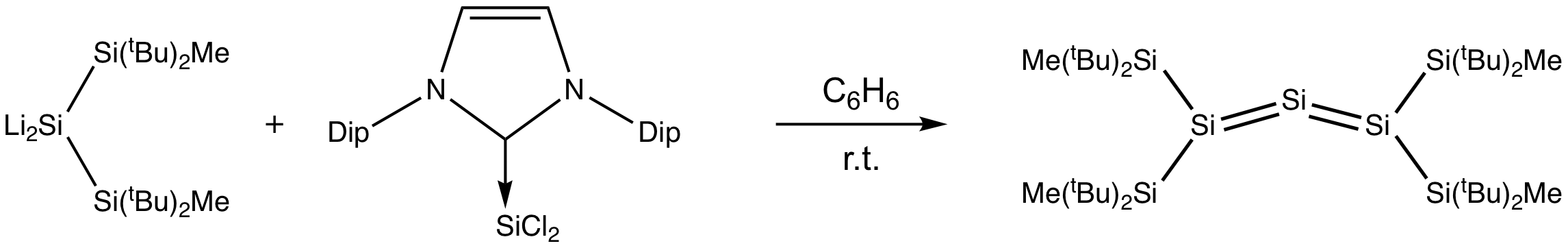

== Structure and bonding ==
=== Geometry ===
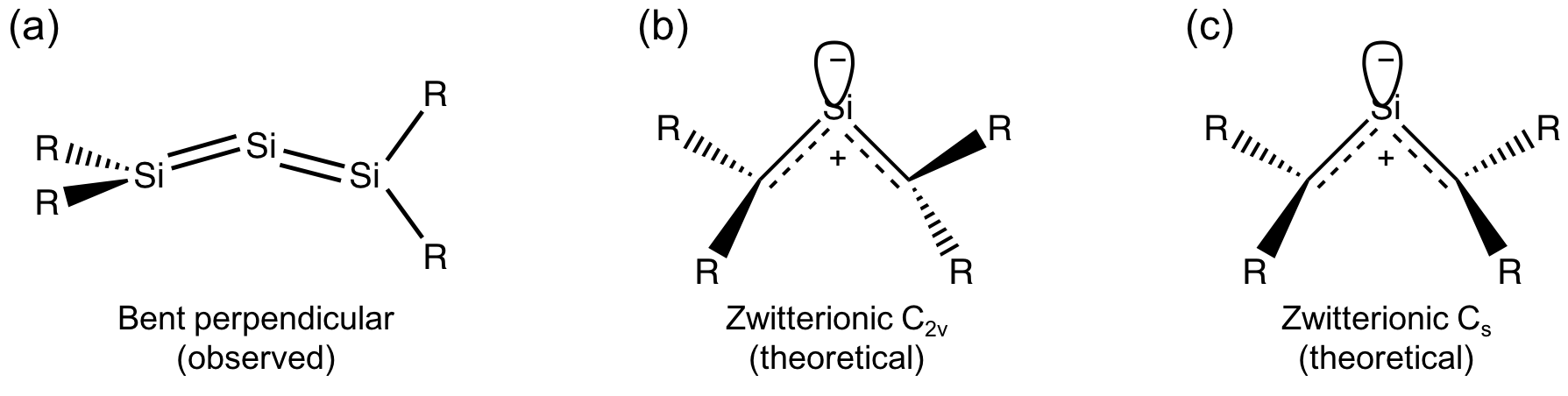
(a) Experimentally observed and (b)(c) theoretically calculated geometries of trisilaallene

In contrast to its linear carbon analog, trisilaallene is characterized by bent geometry. For example, Kira's trisilaallene had a Si=Si=Si bond angle of 136.5º. While the bulky and electropositive silyl ( tBu_{2}MeSi-) substituents widened the bond angle to 164.3º (calculated), no linear trisilaallene has been reported yet. The two planes that each terminal silicon atom and attached substituents lie on tend to be perpendicular to each other, which is analogous with allene. The central silicon atom shows fluxional behavior in that its relative position varies with respect to the substituents planes, and the distribution of resultant isomers depends on the temperature.

The bent structure of trisilaallene is explained by the second-order Jahn-Teller distortion. Unlike the 2s and 2p orbitals of carbon, where the orbital radii of maximum electron density are similar, the 3s orbital of silicon is significantly smaller than 3p orbitals (r_{np}– r_{ns}= -0.2 pm for n = 2 and > 20 pm for n > 2). Therefore, the σ-overlap between the 3s orbital of the central silicon atom and a set of 3p_{z} orbitals of the terminal atoms (when z-axis is the molecular axis) is poor compared to in allene, resulting in a relatively low-lying σ*-orbital. The energy gap between σ*-orbital and π-orbitals originated from 3p_{x} and 3p_{y} orbitals is small enough to induce considerable mixing between the σ*-orbital and one of the π-orbitals with appropriate symmetry. This orbital mixing removes degeneracy between the two π-orbitals, accompanied by geometric distortion.

The ab initio and density functional theory (DFT) calculations predict that Si_{3}R_{4} molecules with smaller substituents (R = H or Me) adopt zwitterionic structures with C_{2v} or C_{s} symmetry and with drastically smaller bond angles (~70º for R = H, ~90º for R = Me). However, the steric congestion required for isolation prevent these highly bent structures.

=== Frontier molecular orbitals ===
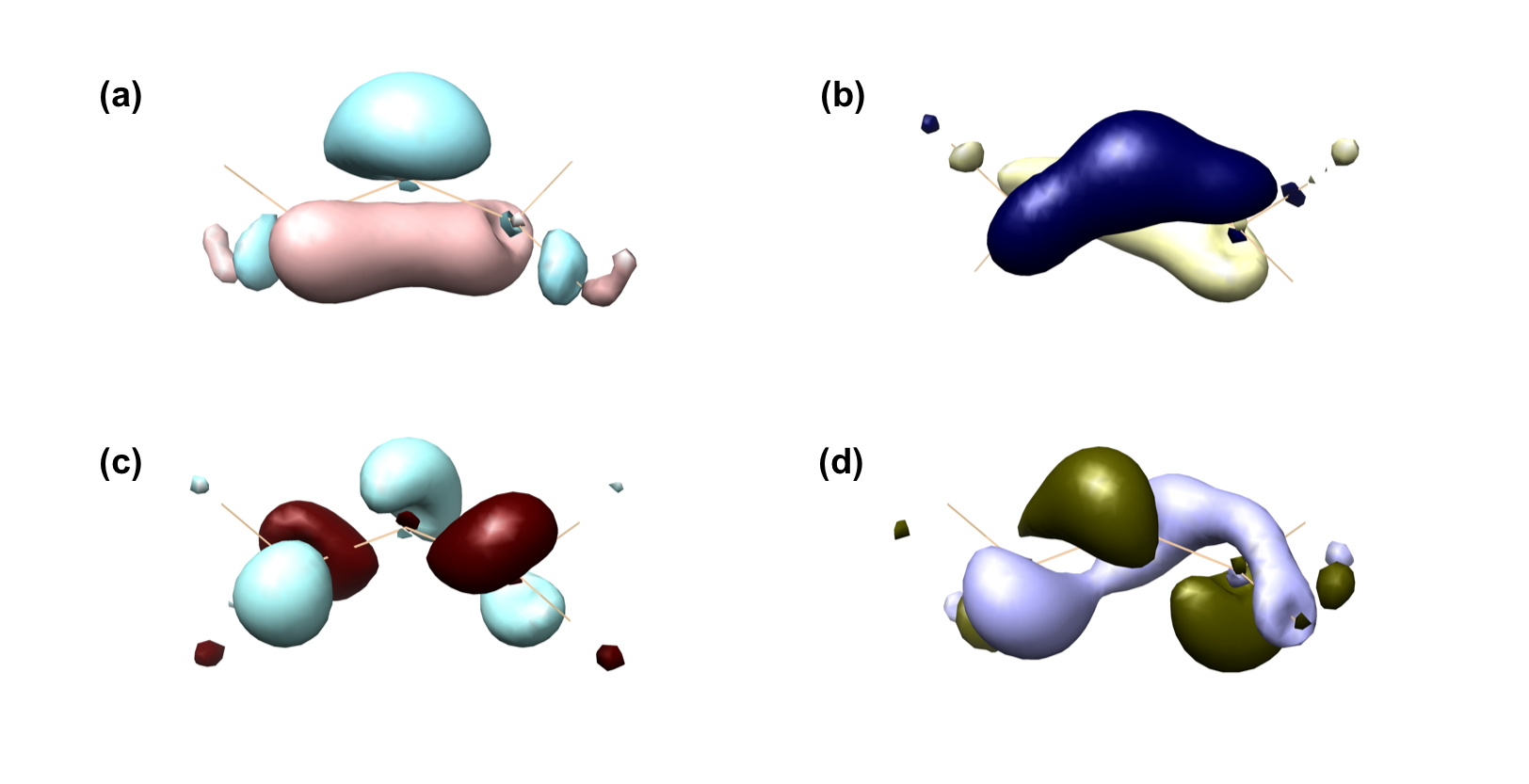
(a) HOMO-1 (b) HOMO (c) LUMO (d) LUMO+1 of alkyl-substituted trisilaallene

DFT calculation at B3LYP/6-31+G(d, p) level suggests that the frontier molecular orbitals of the tetraalkyl-substituted trisilaallene are markedly different from those of allene. The calculation was performed on a model trisilaallene compound with methyl substituents and the experimentally observed bond angle from Kira's compound (136.5º). According to the calculation, the alkyl-substituted trisilaallene has nondegenerate HOMO-1 and HOMO based on π-interaction and also nondegenerate LUMO and LUMO+1 based on π*-interaction, as a direct result of Jahn-Teller distortion. These orbitals correspond to in-plane and out-of-plane twisted overlaps of p-orbitals, which are delocalized over the Si=Si=Si unit. These frontier orbitals make a striking contrast to those of all-carbon allenes, whose frontier orbitals consist of degenerate pairs of π-bonding orbitals (HOMO) and π*-antibonding orbitals (LUMO) localized between two carbons.

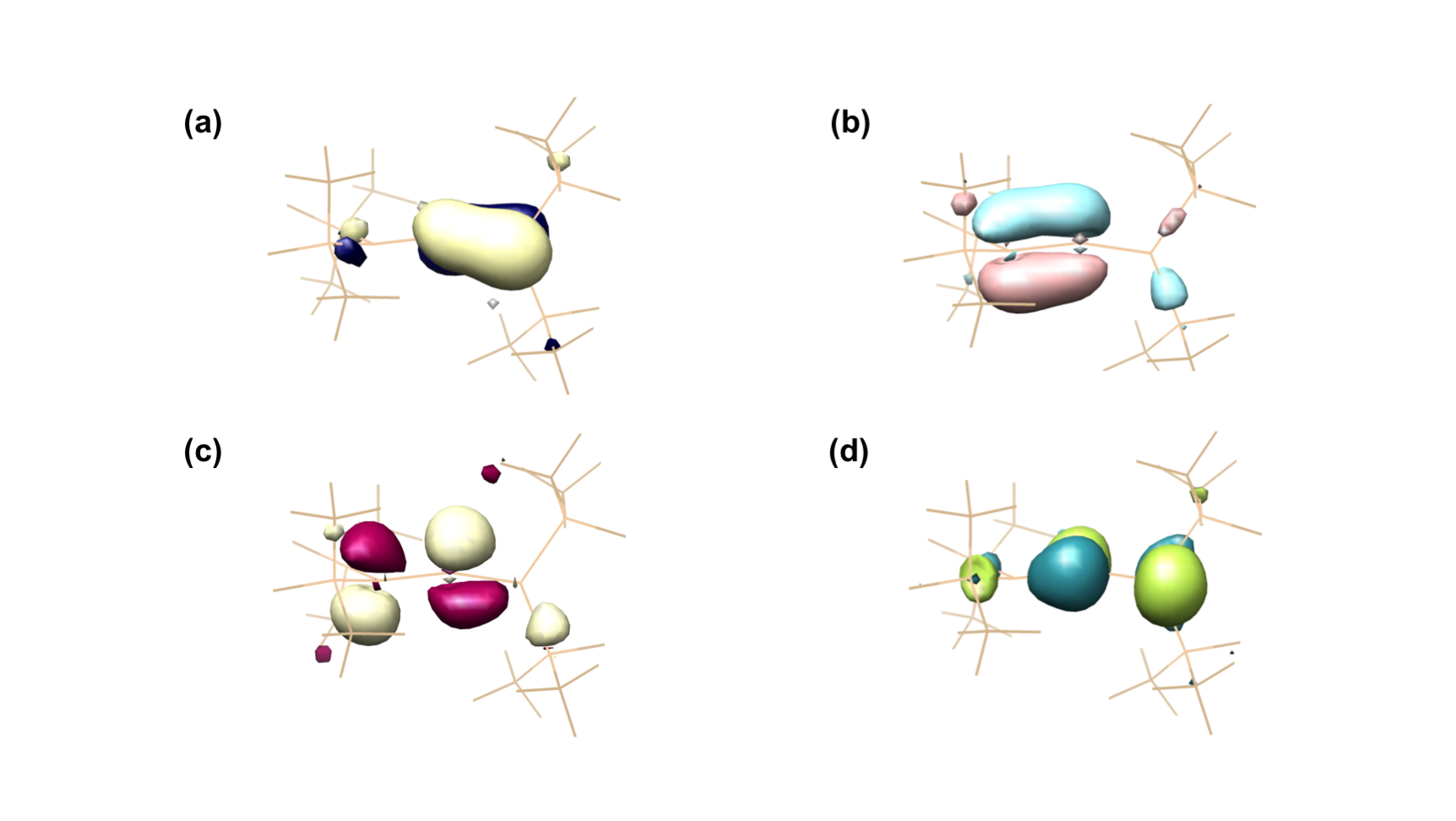
(a)(b) HOMO (c)(d) LUMO of silyl-substituted trisilaallene

The electronic structure of trisilaallene is highly affected by its substituents. On the contrary to the alkyl-substituted trisilaallene, according to DFT calculation at B3LYP/6-31G(d) level, tBu_{2}MeSi-substituted trisilaallene has almost degenerate π (Si=Si) and π* (Si=Si) orbitals, localized between the central silicon atom and only one of the two terminal silicon atoms. The two π-bonding orbitals and the two π*-antibonding orbitals are perpendicular to each other. These features are analogous to all-carbon allenes, which is justified by the close-to-linear geometry of the silyl-substituted trisilaallene.

== Reactivity ==
=== Alcohol addition ===
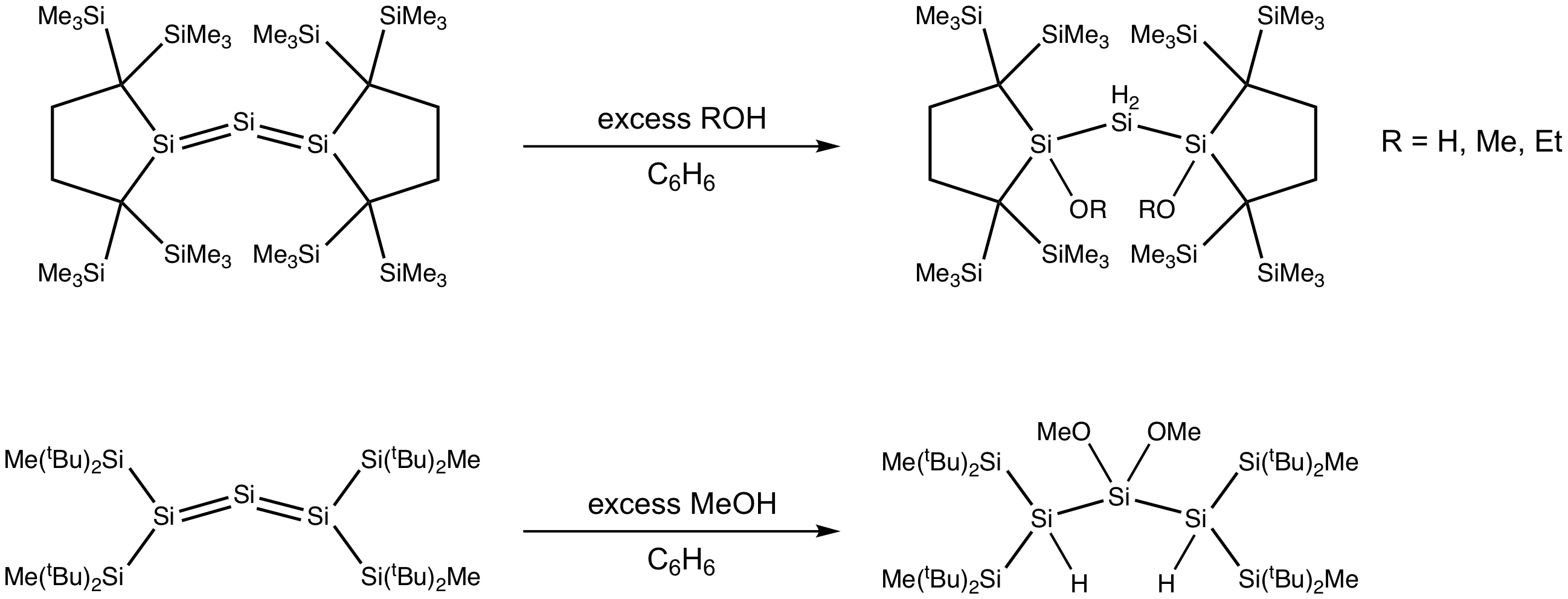

Trisilaallene readily reacts with alcohol to generate dialkoxytrisilane. The regioselectivity of the alcohol addition reaction depends on the type of substituents. In 2007, Kira et al. reported that the alkyl-substituted trisilaallene gives rise to 1,3-dialkoxytrisilane in the presence of excess ROH (R = H, Me, Et). Larger alcohols such as isopropanol and tert-butanol did not react due to the steric congestion arising from the bulky substituents of trisilaallene. In contrast, two methoxy groups were added to the central silicon atom of the silyl-substituted trisilaallene from the reaction with methanol.

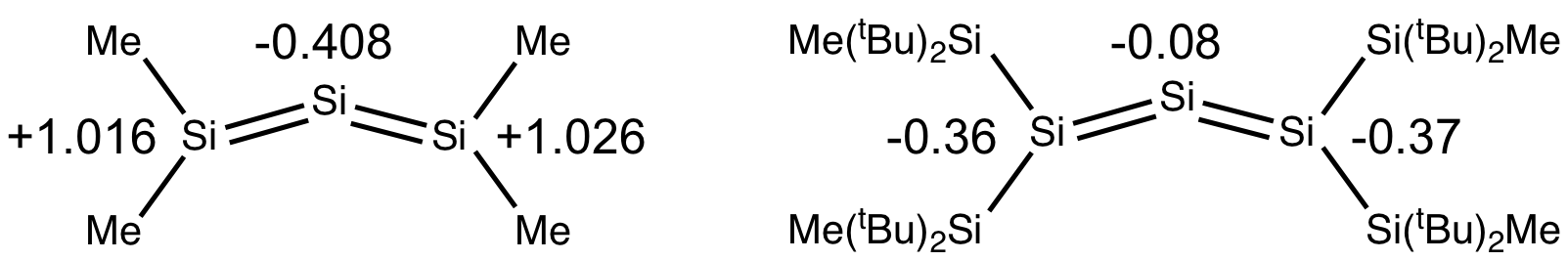
Calculated charge distribution in (left) methyl-substituted trisilaallene (right) silyl-substituted trisilaallene

The different regioselectivity between the alkyl-substituted trisilaallene and the silyl-substituted trisilaallene is explained by charge distribution within Si=Si=Si unit. Calculation at the B3LYP/6-31+G(d,p) level for the methyl-substituted trisilaallene predicted >Si^{δ+}=Si^{δ-}=Si^{δ+}< charge distribution with -0.408 on the central atom and +1.016 / +1.026 on the terminal atoms. Therefore, the nucleophilic addition of alcohol occurs at the terminal atoms. This charge distribution is in accordance with the frontier molecular orbitals of the alkyl-substituted trisilaallene. HOMO-1 and HOMO have the largest orbital coefficient on the central atom, while LUMO and LUMO+1 have larger coefficients on the terminal two. On the other hand, the silyl-substituted trisilaallene is expected to have greater negative charges on the terminal atoms (-0.36 / -0.37) than on the central atom (-0.08), calculated at B3LYP/6-31G(d) level.

=== Miscellaneous ===
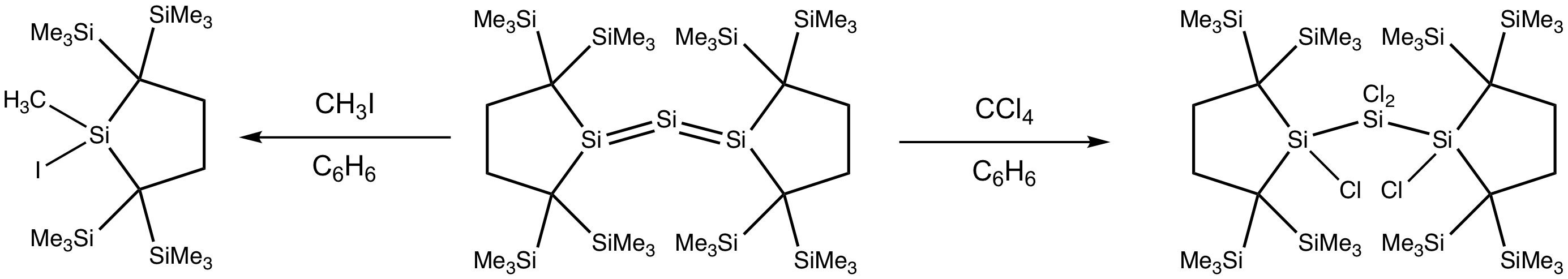

Reactions of trisilaallene with haloalkanes generate halogenated silane products. Treating trisilaallene with methyl iodide breaks the Si=Si double bonds, yielding two molecules of iodo(methyl)silane. Meanwhile, the reaction of trisilaallene with tetrachloromethane gives rise to the complete chlorination of the two Si=Si bonds without bond breaking, yielding tetrachlorotrisilane.

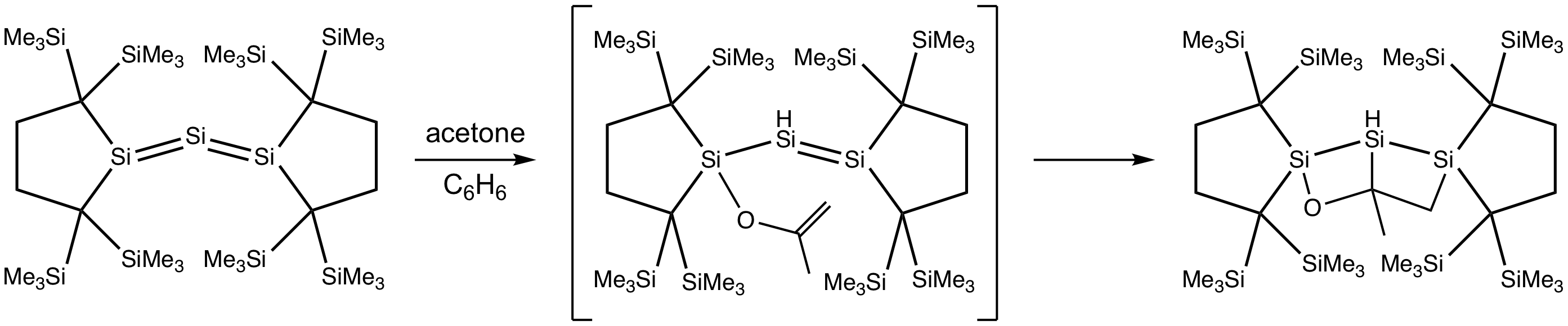

Trisilaallene also reacts with acetone to form a strained bicyclic adduct, whose structure was confirmed by X-ray crystallography. This reaction is supposed to be initiated by an ene reaction of one of the Si=Si double bond with acetone, followed by [2 + 2] cycloaddition of the other Si=Si bond and a C=C bond to give the product.

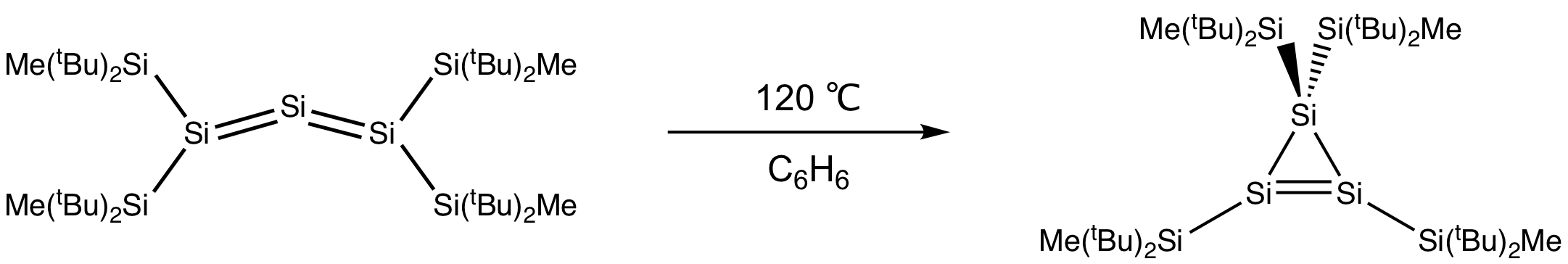

The silyl-substituted trisilaallene goes through thermal rearrangement when heated to 120 °C in benzene. The resultant isomer, tetrakis(di-tert-butylmethylsilyl)cyclotrisilene, was calculated to be thermodynamically more stable than the parent trisilaallene compound by 10.5 kcal/mol.

== See also ==
- Allene
- Silenes
- Organosilicon
