= Robert West (chemist) =

American chemist (1928–2022)

- Born: March 18, 1928; Glen Ridge, New Jersey, U.S.
- Died: October 12, 2022 (aged 94); Madison, Wisconsin, U.S.
- Education: Cornell University, Harvard University
- Known for: Synthesis of the first silicon-silicon double bond, discovery of first thermally-stable silene
- Scientific career
- Fields: Chemistry, especially silicon, silenes, siloxane, organolithium compounds
- Workplaces: University of Wisconsin, Madison; Silatronix, Inc.

Robert Culbertson West Jr. (March 18, 1928 – October 12, 2022) was an American chemist.

West was an E. G. Rochow Professor of Chemistry Emeritus at the University of Wisconsin–Madison; Director of the Organosilicon Research Center, University of Wisconsin–Madison 1999–20??; President, Silatronix, Inc. (2007–20??); Distinguished Professor, Yonsei University, 2007–2011. He died in Madison, Wisconsin on October 12, 2022, at the age of 94.

== Education ==
West received his Bachelor of Arts in chemistry from Cornell University in 1950, proceeding on to Harvard University where he received his Master of Arts in 1952 and Ph.D. in 1954. At Cornell, he was a member of the Quill and Dagger society.

== Notable work ==
West was a chemist best known for his groundbreaking research in silicon chemistry as well as for his work with oxocarbons and organolithium compounds. In 2004, West was listed as one of the most cited scientists during the period 1981–1999, according to a citation survey by Thomson ISI. West's most well-known discovery was the synthesis of the first ever silicon-silicon double bond in 1981, a feat which broke the so-called "double-bond rule" (which stated that main group elements below row two of the periodic table could not form double bonds). West later discovered the first example of a stable silylene, a form of divalent silicon, acting as the silicon analog to the now catalytically important carbene. West also developed a new model for understanding rotations in polymers. West's numerous other discoveries include a siloxane-based electrolyte which has made possible revolutionary rechargeable implantable batteries for biomedical applications including the treatment of spinal injuries and nerve damage. His later interests included the synthesis of silicon-containing anticancer drugs, and the study of silicon and germanium compounds by muon resonance spectroscopy.

== Other interests ==
West was an instrument-rated pilot with over 2500 hours as pilot-in-command. He was a mountaineer, with over 50 first ascents in the mountains of British Columbia. He was known for his eccentric lifestyle, liberal political views, and activism for women's reproductive rights both in the US and internationally. In 1972, along with Anne Nicol Gaylor, he co-founded the Women's Medical Fund to help Wisconsin women pay for abortions.

His international interests led to extensive collaborative research with chemistry departments in major universities in countries including Austria, Brazil, Canada, Germany, Hungary, Israel, Japan, Korea, Lebanon, Mexico, Norway, Russia and the UK. Many of his over 600 publications were in collaboration with scientists in countries outside the USA.
