= Sun-free photovoltaics =

Sun-free photovoltaics is a photovoltaics technology which does not require sunlight to produce electricity. This technique was developed by research team at Massachusetts Institute of Technology. Photovoltaic cells convert light to electricity most efficiently at specific wavelengths. The surface features of Sun-free photovoltaics is engineered such that it converts heat energy into the specific wavelengths. This increases the efficiency of existing thermophotovoltaic (TPV) systems.

== Principle of working ==
The surface of this material is etched with billions of nanoscale pits, so that it emits wave at the specified wavelengths and suppresses other wavelengths which are not required. When the surface is exposed to heat energy, it radiates light energy at required wavelengths. The atoms liberates free electrons when radiation is applied, thus generating electricity.

== Development ==
A device that uses radioisotopes is capable of producing electricity for up to 30 years without interruption using a process called radioactive decay. Another similar device was developed by researchers from MIT, which uses butane as a fuel source. It has the size of a button and is estimated to operate three times longer than a similarly sized lithium-ion battery and has the advantage of recharging immediately upon refuelling. Thermo-photovoltaics, which is a technology developed in the 1960s, is capable of converting heat energy into electricity. It was previously known that sunlight is not absolutely necessary for photovoltaic cells to operate. Infrared radiation is not utilized efficiently in photovoltaic materials which are characterized by low band gap, though the performance is comparatively better than normal silicon photovoltaic cells. One example of photovoltaics utilizing heat is a photovoltaic diode which produces electricity from heat given off by a hydrocarbon fuelled thermal emitter.

In Sun-free photovoltaics, the thermal emitter described above is finely tuned to emit specific wavelengths that the photovoltaic diode can utilize, while at the same time stopping the wavelengths that cannot be used by the diode. This is achieved by etching features of nanoscale like ridges and holes on a photonic crystal so that the light passing through the crystal can be modified.

== Operation ==
A slab of tungsten is used as a thermal emitter with billions of nanoscale pits on the surface, with each pit acting like a resonator. On heating, specific wavelengths are radiated by the slab as it generates an altered emission spectrum.

== Applications ==
Sun-free photovoltaics can be applied in electronic devices like smartphones. Its value of current density has the capability to be tripled in the coming years, when it could power a smartphone for more than 20 days without needing to recharge in between. It can also be used to utilize waste heat from electric appliances like televisions and electronic appliances like mobile phones.

== See also ==
- Quantum efficiency of a solar cell
- Energy conversion efficiency
- Photoelectric effect
- Solar cell efficiency
