= Cyclopentasilane =

Names
- IUPAC name Pentasilolane

Identifiers
CAS Number	289-22-5
3D model (JSmol)	Interactive image
ChemSpider	19148748
PubChem CID	57371111
CompTox Dashboard (EPA)	DTXSID50462194
- InChI: InChI=1S/H10Si5/c1-2-4-5-3-1/h1-5H2 Key: CVLHDNLPWKYNNR-UHFFFAOYSA-N
- SMILES: [SiH2]1[SiH2][SiH2][SiH2][SiH2]1

Properties
Chemical formula	H_{10}Si_{5}
Molar mass	150.505 g·mol^{−1}
Appearance	Colorless liquid
Melting point	−10.5 °C (13.1 °F; 262.6 K)
Boiling point	decomposes at 84°C
- Except where otherwise noted, data are given for materials in their standard state (at 25 °C [77 °F], 100 kPa). Infobox references

Cyclopentasilane is a cyclic compound of silicon and hydrogen with the chemical formula Si_{5}H_{10}. Containing five silicon atoms arranged in a pentagonal ring, it is the silicon analog of cyclopentane. Cyclopentasilane is a colorless pyrophoric liquid. It is an oligosilane. It is of research interest because of its potential use as a liquid silicon ink for printing silicon structures on integrated circuits or solar cells.

== Production ==
Cyclopentasilane can be made from diphenyldichlorosilane (C_{6}H_{5})_{2}SiCl_{2} reacting with lithium. This forms decaphenylcyclopentasilane. This reacts with aluminium chloride in benzene catalysed with hydrogen chloride to yield decachlorocyclopentasilane. Decachlorocyclopentasilane then has its chlorine replaced by hydrogen using lithium aluminium hydride.

== Properties ==
Cyclopentasilane is pyrophoric. It has a σ-delocalization property. Cyclopentasilane is a liquid at standard conditions, but can be frozen to crystals at 173K. The monoclinic crystals are not isomorphic to cyclopentane. The silicon to silicon bond lengths in the solid vary from 2.3353 and 2.3377 Å, which is shorter than in the substituted cyclopentasilanes or linear silanes. In gas form, those bond lengths, as measured by electron diffraction, increased to 2.342 Å.

Cyclopentasilane is sensitive, and starts decomposing when heated over 84°C, when it loses hydrogen and polymerizes. As it is heated more silane is produced, and at 178°C it yields disilane. When heated to over 250°C it decomposes to a silicon hydrogen polymer.

=== Molecule shape ===
A five member ring can adopt a number of shapes: planar with all the atoms arranged in a pentagon with symmetry D_{5h}; envelope symmetry C_{s}, with four atoms in a rectangular plane and one popped up like the flap, and twist with symmetry C_{2}. The planar form has slightly higher energy than the other forms.
