= Silane =

Chemical compound (SiH4)

- Stereo structural formula of silane

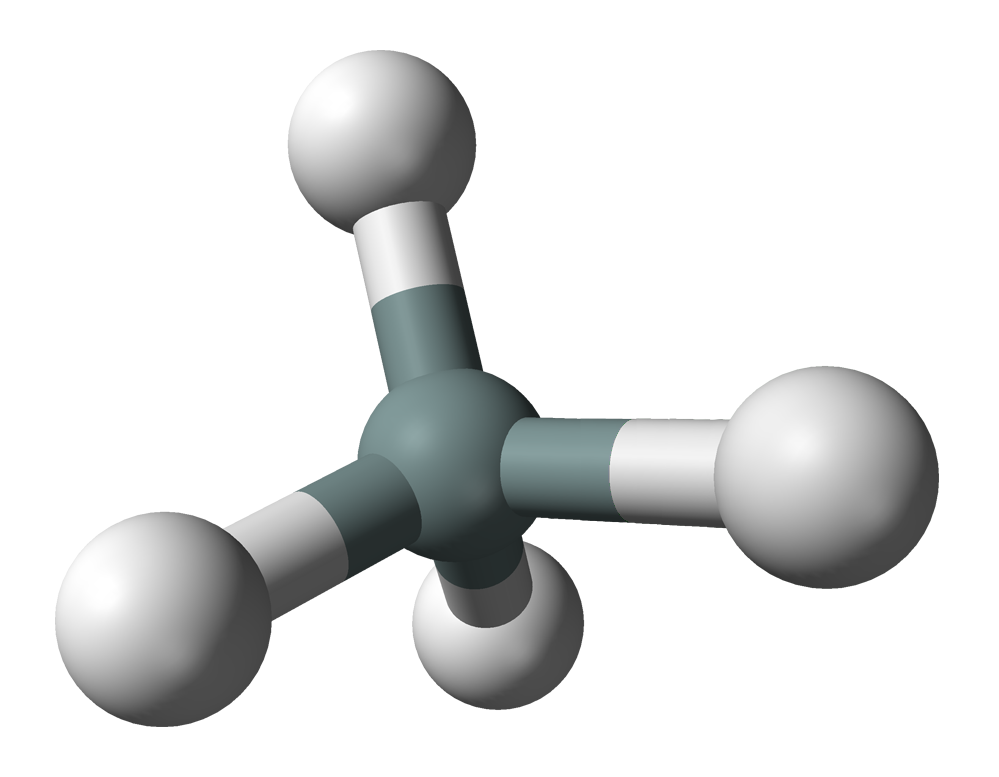
Ball-and-stick model of silane
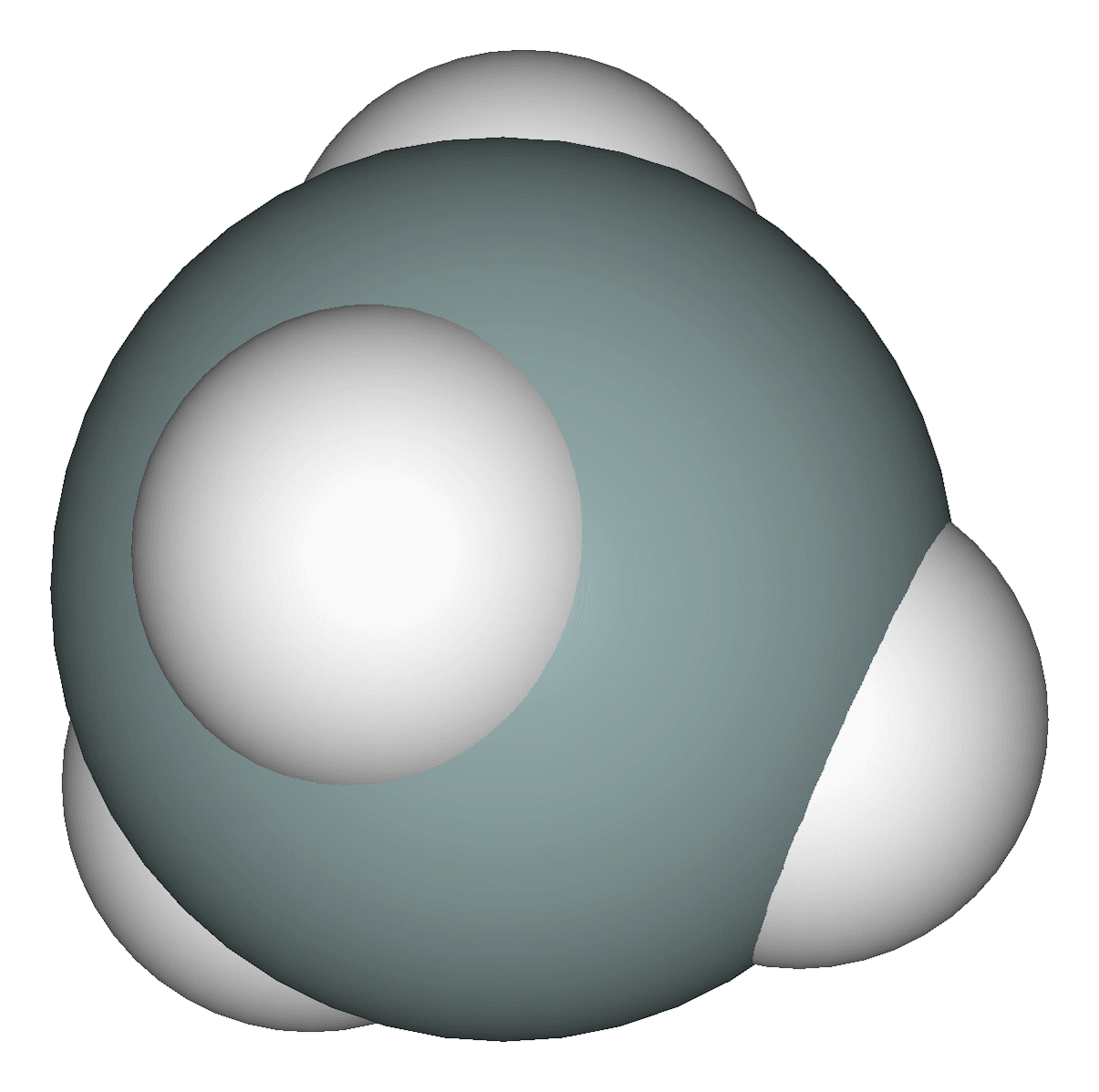
Spacefill model of silane

Names
- IUPAC name Silane
- Systematic IUPAC name Silicane
- Other names: Monosilane; Silicon(IV) hydride; Silicon tetrahydride

Identifiers
CAS Number	7803-62-5
3D model (JSmol)	Interactive image
ChEBI	CHEBI:29389
ChemSpider	22393
ECHA InfoCard	100.029.331
Gmelin Reference	273
PubChem CID	23953
RTECS number	VV1400000
UNII	5J076063R1
UN number	2203
CompTox Dashboard (EPA)	DTXSID6052534
- InChI: InChI=1S/SiH4/h1H4 Key: BLRPTPMANUNPDV-UHFFFAOYSA-N; InChI=1/SiH4/h1H4 Key: BLRPTPMANUNPDV-UHFFFAOYAE
- SMILES: [SiH4]

Properties
Chemical formula	SiH_{4}
Molar mass	32.117 g·mol^{−1}
Appearance	Colorless gas
Odor	Repulsive
Density	1.313 g/L
Melting point	−185 °C (−301.0 °F; 88.1 K)
Boiling point	−111.9 °C (−169.4 °F; 161.2 K)
Solubility in water	Reacts slowly
Vapor pressure	>1 atm (20 °C)
Conjugate acid	Silanium (sometimes spelled silonium)

Structure
Molecular shape	Tetrahedral r(Si-H) = 1.4798 Å
Dipole moment	0 D

Thermochemistry
Heat capacity (C)	42.81 J/mol·K
Std molar entropy (S^{⦵}_{298})	204.61 J/mol·K
Std enthalpy of formation (Δ_{f}H^{⦵}_{298})	34.31 kJ/mol
Gibbs free energy (Δ_{f}G^{⦵})	56.91 kJ/mol

Hazards
- Occupational safety and health (OHS/OSH)
Main hazards	Extremely flammable, pyrophoric in air
- GHS labelling
Pictograms	(GHS02: Flammable)
Signal word	Danger
Hazard statements	H220
Precautionary statements	P210, P222, P230, P280, P377, P381, P403, P410+P403
NFPA 704 (fire diamond)	1 4 3
Flash point	Not applicable, pyrophoric gas
Autoignition temperature	~ 18 °C (64 °F; 291 K)
Explosive limits	1.37–100%
- NIOSH (US health exposure limits)
PEL (Permissible)	None
REL (Recommended)	TWA 5 ppm (7 mg/m^{3})
IDLH (Immediate danger)	N.D.
Safety data sheet (SDS)	ICSC 0564

Related compounds
Related tetrahydride compounds	Methane; Germane; Stannane; Plumbane
Related compounds	Phenylsilane; Vinylsilane; Disilane; Trisilane
- Except where otherwise noted, data are given for materials in their standard state (at 25 °C [77 °F], 100 kPa). verify (what is ?) Infobox references

Silane (silicane) is an inorganic compound with chemical formula SiH_{4}. It is a colorless, pyrophoric gas with a sharp, repulsive, pungent smell, somewhat similar to that of acetic acid. Silane is of practical interest as a precursor to elemental silicon. Silanes with alkyl groups are effective water repellents for mineral surfaces such as concrete and masonry. Silanes with both organic and inorganic attachments are used as coupling agents. They are commonly used to apply coatings to surfaces or as an adhesion promoter.

== Production ==
=== Commercial-scale routes ===
Silane can be produced by several routes. Typically, it arises from the reaction of hydrogen chloride with magnesium silicide:

Mg_{2}Si + 4 HCl → 2 MgCl_{2} + SiH_{4}

It is also prepared from metallurgical-grade silicon in a two-step process. First, silicon is treated with hydrogen chloride at about 300 °C to produce trichlorosilane, HSiCl3, along with hydrogen gas, according to the chemical equation

Si + 3 HCl → HSiCl_{3} + H_{2}

The trichlorosilane is then converted to a mixture of silane and silicon tetrachloride:

4 HSiCl_{3} → SiH_{4} + 3 SiCl_{4}

This redistribution reaction requires a catalyst.

The most commonly used catalysts for this process are metal halides, particularly aluminium chloride. This is referred to as a redistribution reaction, which is a double displacement involving the same central element. It may also be thought of as a disproportionation reaction, even though there is no change in the oxidation number for silicon (Si has a nominal oxidation number IV in all three species). However, the utility of the oxidation number concept for a covalent molecule, even a polar covalent molecule, is ambiguous. The silicon atom could be rationalized as having the highest formal oxidation state and partial positive charge in SiCl_{4} and the lowest formal oxidation state in SiH_{4}, since Cl is far more electronegative than is H.

An alternative industrial process for the preparation of very high-purity silane, suitable for use in the production of semiconductor-grade silicon, starts with metallurgical-grade silicon, hydrogen, and silicon tetrachloride and involves a complex series of redistribution reactions (producing byproducts that are recycled in the process) and distillations. The reactions are summarized below:

1. Si + 2 H_{2} + 3 SiCl_{4} → 4 SiHCl_{3}
2. 2 SiHCl_{3} → SiH_{2}Cl_{2} + SiCl_{4}
3. 2 SiH_{2}Cl_{2} → SiHCl_{3} + SiH_{3}Cl
4. 2 SiH_{3}Cl → SiH_{4} + SiH_{2}Cl_{2}

The silane produced by this route can be thermally decomposed to produce high-purity silicon and hydrogen in a single pass.

Still other industrial routes to silane involve reduction of silicon tetrafluoride (SiF_{4}) with sodium hydride (NaH) or reduction of SiCl_{4} with lithium aluminium hydride (LiAlH_{4}).

Another commercial production of silane involves reduction of silicon dioxide (SiO_{2}) under Al and H_{2} gas in a mixture of NaCl and aluminum chloride (AlCl_{3}) at high pressures:

3 SiO_{2} + 6 H_{2} + 4 Al → 3 SiH_{4} + 2 Al_{2}O_{3}

=== Laboratory-scale routes ===
In 1857, the German chemists Heinrich Buff and Friedrich Woehler discovered silane among the products formed by the action of hydrochloric acid on aluminum silicide, which they had previously prepared. They called the compound siliciuretted hydrogen.

For classroom demonstrations, silane can be produced by heating sand with magnesium powder to produce magnesium silicide (Mg_{2}Si), then pouring the mixture into hydrochloric acid. The magnesium silicide reacts with the acid to produce silane gas, which burns on contact with air and produces tiny explosions. This may be classified as a heterogeneous acid–base chemical reaction, since the isolated Si^{4−} ion in the Mg_{2}Si antifluorite structure can serve as a Brønsted–Lowry base capable of accepting four protons. It can be written as

4 HCl + Mg_{2}Si → SiH_{4} + 2 MgCl_{2}

In general, the alkaline-earth metals form silicides with the following stoichiometries: M^{II}_{2}Si, M^{II}Si, and M^{II}Si_{2}. In all cases, these substances react with Brønsted–Lowry acids to produce some type of hydride of silicon that is dependent on the Si anion connectivity in the silicide. The possible products include SiH_{4} and/or higher molecules in the homologous series Si_{n}H_{2n+2}, a polymeric silicon hydride, or a silicic acid. Hence, M^{II}Si with their zigzag chains of Si^{2−} anions (containing two lone pairs of electrons on each Si anion that can accept protons) yield the polymeric hydride (SiH_{2})_{x}.

Yet another small-scale route for the production of silane is from the action of sodium amalgam on dichlorosilane, SiH_{2}Cl_{2}, to yield monosilane along with some yellow polymerized silicon hydride (SiH)_{x}.

== Properties ==
Silane is the silicon analogue of methane. All four Si−H bonds are equal and their length is 147.98 pm. Because of the greater electronegativity of hydrogen in comparison to silicon, this Si–H bond polarity is the opposite of that in the C–H bonds of methane. One consequence of this reversed polarity is the greater tendency of silane to form complexes with transition metals. A second consequence is that silane is pyrophoric — it undergoes spontaneous combustion in air, without the need for external ignition. However, the difficulties in explaining the available (often contradictory) combustion data are ascribed to the fact that silane itself is stable and that the natural formation of larger silanes during production, as well as the sensitivity of combustion to impurities such as moisture and to the catalytic effects of container surfaces causes its pyrophoricity. Above 420 °C (788 °F), silane decomposes into silicon and hydrogen; it can therefore be used in the chemical vapor deposition of silicon.

The Si–H bond strength is around 384 kJ/mol, which is about 20% weaker than the H–H bond in H_{2}. Consequently, compounds containing Si–H bonds are much more reactive than is H_{2}. The strength of the Si–H bond is modestly affected by other substituents: the Si–H bond strengths are: SiHF_{3} 419 kJ/mol, SiHCl_{3} 382 kJ/mol, and SiHMe_{3} 398 kJ/mol.

== Applications ==
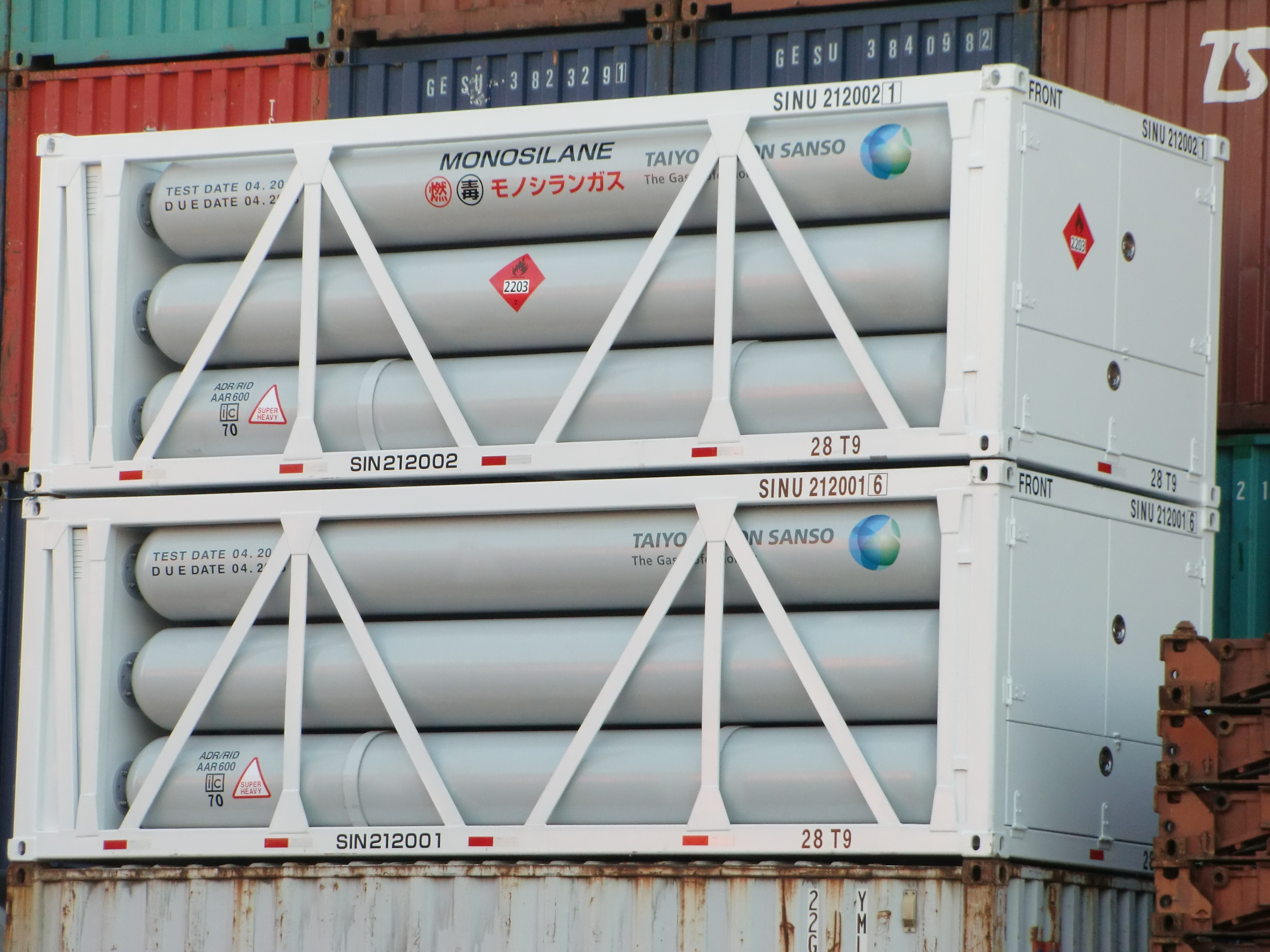
Monosilane gas shipping containers in Japan.

While diverse applications exist for organosilanes, silane itself has one dominant application, as a precursor to elemental silicon, particularly in the semiconductor industry. The higher silanes, such as di- and trisilane, are only of academic interest. About 300 metric tons per year of silane were consumed in the late 1990s. Low-cost solar photovoltaic module manufacturing has led to substantial consumption of silane for depositing hydrogenated amorphous silicon (a-Si:H) on glass and other substrates like metal and plastic. The plasma-enhanced chemical vapor deposition (PECVD) process is relatively inefficient at materials utilization with approximately 85% of the silane being wasted. To reduce the waste and ecological footprint of a-Si:H-based solar cells further, several recycling efforts have been developed.

== Safety and precautions ==
A number of fatal industrial accidents produced by combustion and detonation of leaked silane in air have been reported.

Silane is a pyrophoric gas (capable of autoignition at temperatures below 54 °C or 129 °F).

SiH_{4} + 2 O_{2} → SiO_{2} + 2 H_{2}O ΔH = −1517 kJ/mol = −47.23 kJ/g
SiH_{4} + O_{2} → SiO_{2} + 2 H_{2}
SiH_{4} + O_{2} → SiH_{2}O + H_{2}O
2 SiH_{4} + O_{2} → 2 SiH_{2}O + 2 H_{2}
SiH_{2}O + O_{2} → SiO_{2} + H_{2}O

For lean mixtures a two-stage reaction process has been proposed, which consists of a silane consumption process and a hydrogen oxidation process. The heat of SiO_{2}(s) condensation increases the burning velocity due to thermal feedback.

Diluted silane mixtures with inert gases such as nitrogen or argon are even more likely to ignite when leaked into open air, compared to pure silane: even a 1% mixture of silane in pure nitrogen easily ignites when exposed to air.

In Japan, in order to reduce the danger of silane for amorphous silicon solar cell manufacturing, several companies began to dilute silane with hydrogen gas. This resulted in a symbiotic benefit of making more stable solar photovoltaic cells as it reduced the Staebler–Wronski effect.

Unlike methane, silane is slightly toxic: the lethal concentration in air for rats (LC_{50}) is 0.96% (9,600 ppm) over a 4-hour exposure. In addition, contact with eyes may form silicic acid with resultant irritation.

In regards to occupational exposure of silane to workers, the US National Institute for Occupational Safety and Health has set a recommended exposure limit of 5 ppm (7 mg/m^{3}) over an eight-hour time-weighted average.

== See also ==
- Binary silicon-hydrogen compounds (sometimes called silanes)
- Silanization
- Magnesium silicide
- Methane, in which carbon (in that compound) and silicon (in this compound) are together in the carbon group.

== Cited sources ==
- Haynes, William M., ed. (2011). CRC Handbook of Chemistry and Physics (92nd ed.). CRC Press. ISBN 978-1439855119.
