= Disilene =

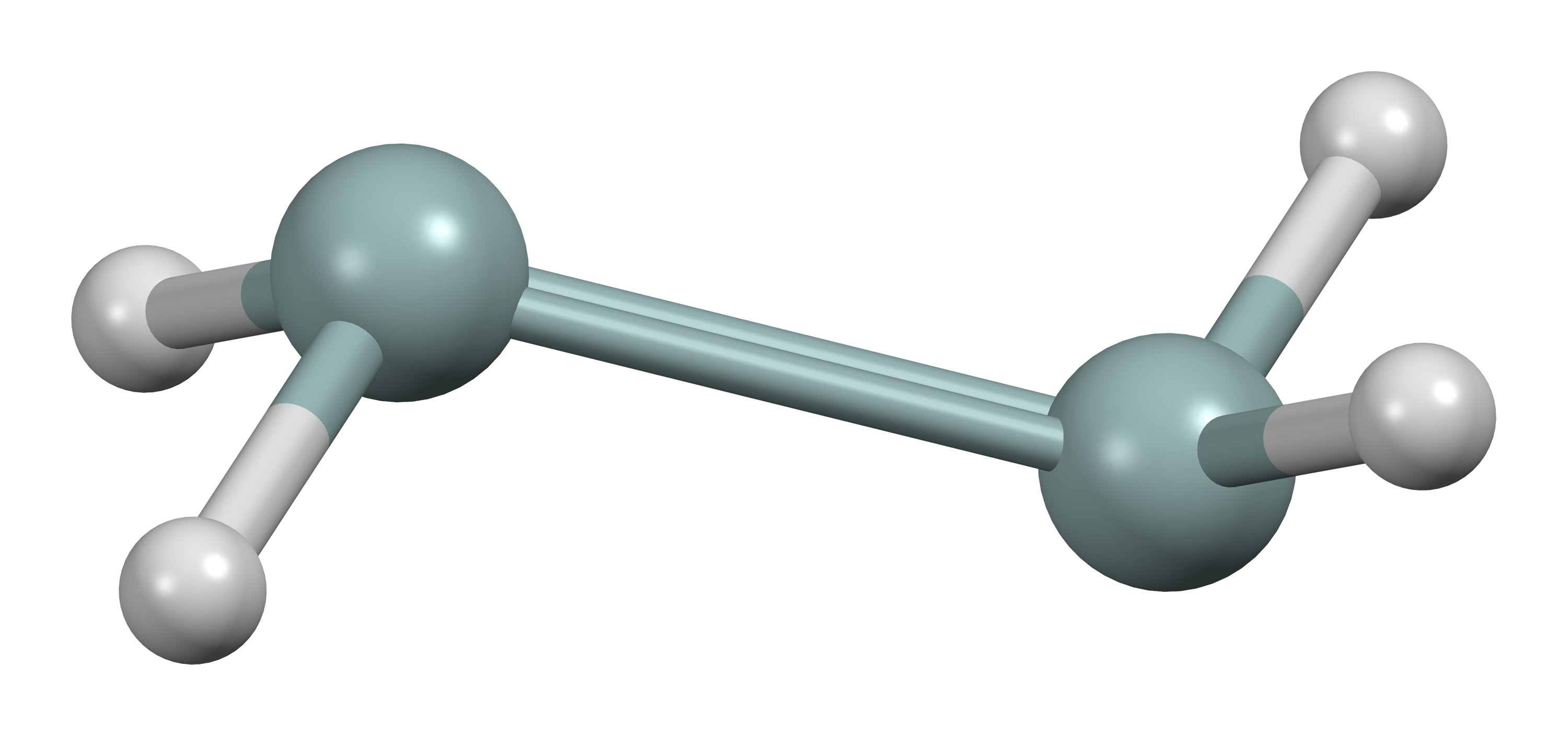

Names
- IUPAC name Disilene

Identifiers
CAS Number	15435-77-5
3D model (JSmol)	Interactive image
ChemSpider	123409
PubChem CID	139934
CompTox Dashboard (EPA)	DTXSID50165597
- InChI: InChI=1S/H4Si2/c1-2/h1-2H2 Key: IKQCSDAPCHQIFR-UHFFFAOYSA-N
- SMILES: [SiH2]=[SiH2]

Properties
Chemical formula	H_{4}Si_{2}
Molar mass	60.202 g·mol^{−1}
- Except where otherwise noted, data are given for materials in their standard state (at 25 °C [77 °F], 100 kPa). Infobox references

Disilene is an inorganic compound with the chemical formula Si_{2}H_{4}. The name disilene, referring to the structure of a particular prototropic tautomer of the molecule. It is the simplest silene.

== Properties and bonding ==
Disilene is a molecule with one Si=Si bond and four equivalent Si-H bonds. Its structure is like that of ethylene if ethylene's carbon atoms were replaced by silicon. However, unlike ethylene, disilene is kinetically unstable with respect to tautomerisation. Disilene has two other tautomers, that are very close in energy: (μ^{2}-H)disilene, and disilanylidene.

== Organodisilenes ==
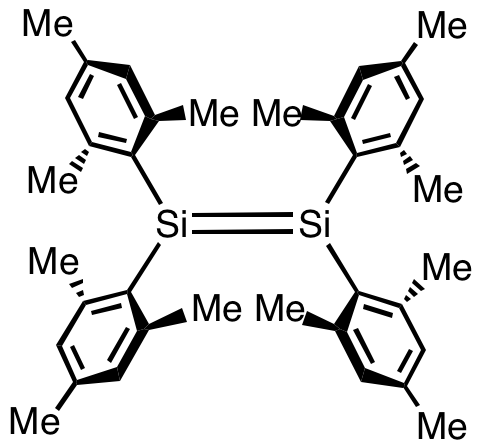
Structure of tetramesityl disilene.

Disilenes bearing sterically bulky substituents have been well characterized although they remain mainly of academic interest. The first stabilised disilene was tetramesityldisilene, (C_{6}Me_{3}H_{2})_{4}Si_{2}. The Si=Si distance in this molecule is 2.15 Å, about 10% shorter than a typical Si–Si single bond. The Si_{2}C_{4} core is roughly planar. Such species are typically prepared by reduction of organosilicon halides:

2 R_{2}SiCl_{2} + 4 Na → R_{2}Si=SiR_{2} + 4 NaCl.

An alternative synthesis involves photolysis of trisilacyclopropanes. When the R group is not bulky, cyclic or polymeric, polysilanes are the products.

In one study a disilene is prepared by an intramolecular coupling of a 1,1-dibromosilane with potassium graphite. The silicon double bond in the resulting compound has a bond length of 227 picometer (second largest ever found) with trans-bent angles 33° and 31° (by X-ray diffraction).

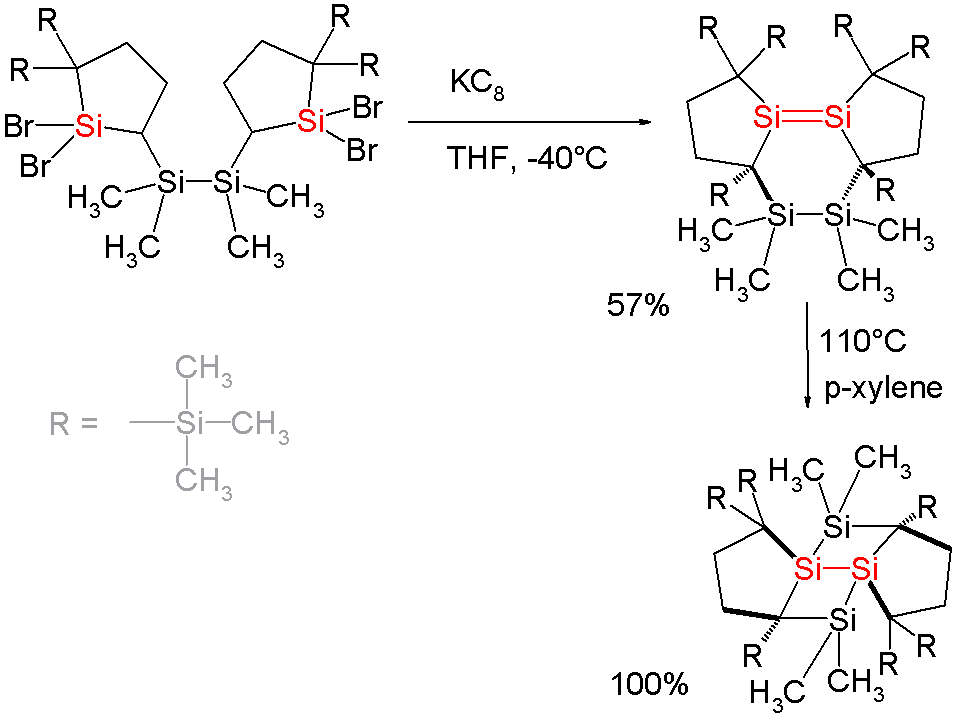
Tricyclic disilenes with highly strained Si-Si double bonds

In addition to this the substituents around the Si-Si bond are twisted by 43°. The disilene isomerizes to a tetracyclic compound by heating at 110 °C in xylene thereby releasing its strain energy.

== See also ==
- Disilane
- Disilyne
