= Disilyne =

- Structural formula of disilyne

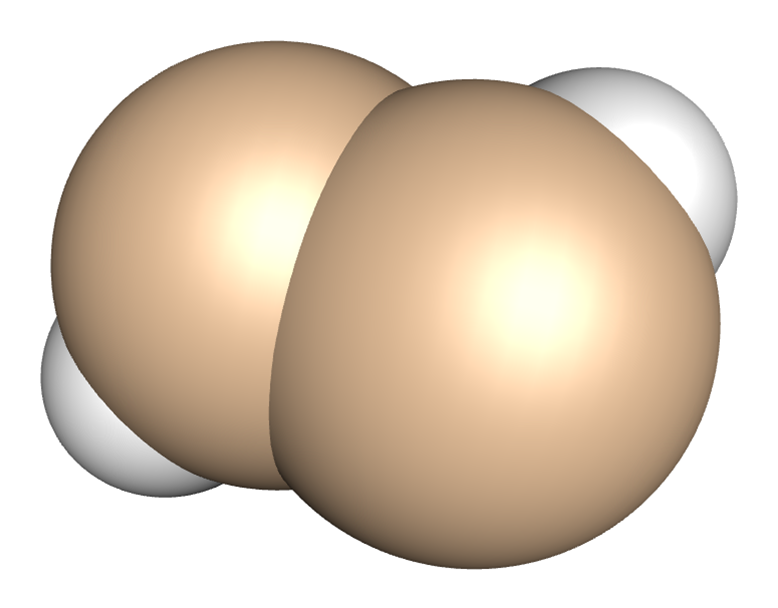

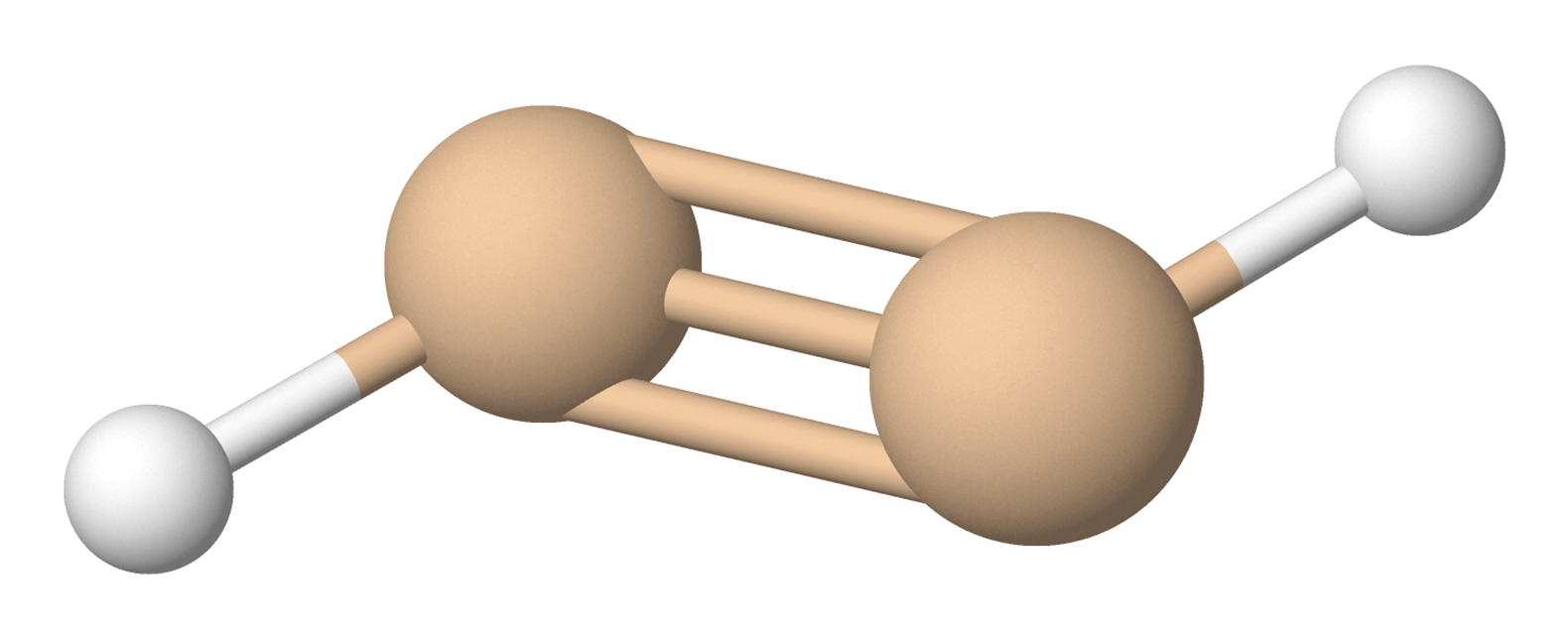

Names
- IUPAC name Disilyne

Identifiers
CAS Number	36835-58-2
3D model (JSmol)	Interactive image
ChemSpider	16341537
PubChem CID	71420045
CompTox Dashboard (EPA)	DTXSID101027153
- InChI: InChI=1S/H2Si2/c1-2/h1-2H Key: NWEREQWWNYLPTF-UHFFFAOYSA-N
- SMILES: [SiH]#[SiH]

Properties
Chemical formula	H_{2}Si_{2}
Molar mass	58.186 g·mol^{−1}

Related compounds
Related compounds	Acetylene methylacetylene
- Except where otherwise noted, data are given for materials in their standard state (at 25 °C [77 °F], 100 kPa). Infobox references

Disilyne is a low valent silicon compound with the chemical formula Si_{2}R_{2} where oxidation state of Si is +1. Several isomers are possible, but none are sufficiently stable to be of practical value. Substituted disilynes contain a formal silicon–silicon triple bond and as such are sometimes written R_{2}Si_{2} (where R is a substituent group). They are the silicon analogues of alkynes.

The term silyne has two diverse meanings. Some chemists use it to refer to compounds containing a silicon–silicon triple bond, by analogy to the carbon–carbon triple bond in alkynes, whereas others use the term to refer to compounds containing a silicon–carbon triple bond by analogy to silene, which often refers to compounds containing silicon–carbon double bonds. The term polysilyne can refer to the layer polymer (SiH)_{n} or substituted derivatives.

== Substituted disilynes ==
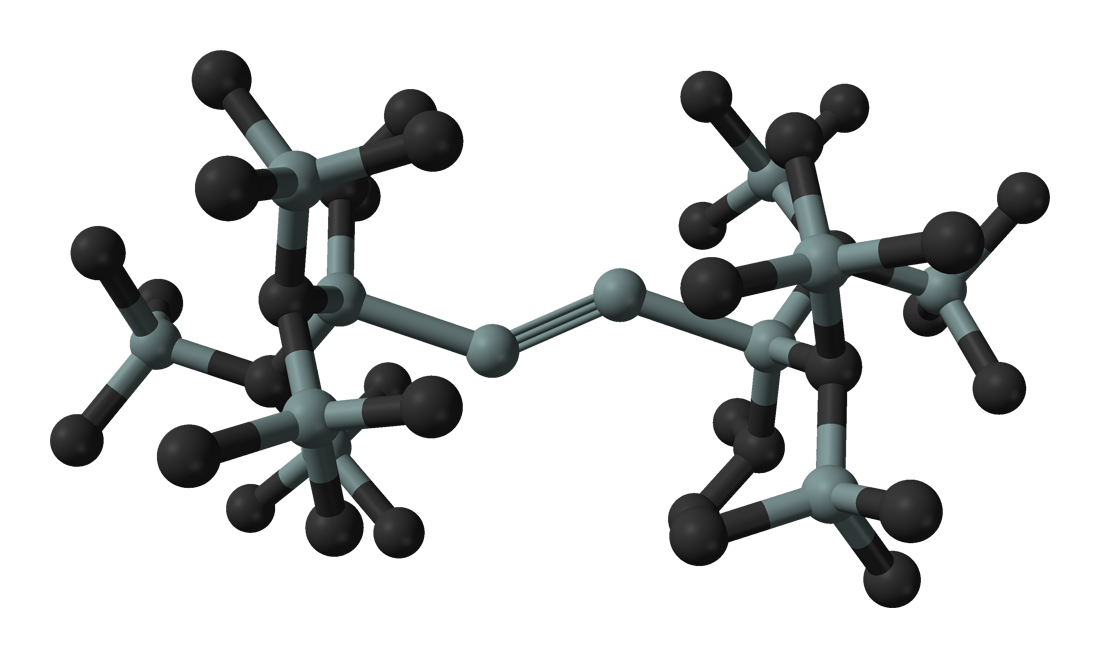
The structure of the first disilyne characterised

The first substituted disilyne to be isolated and characterised by X-ray crystallography is one with an additional trisubstituted silicon group on each silicon of the disilyne core. The structure R′_{2}R′′Si−Si≡Si−SiR′′R′_{2}, where R′ = HC(SiMe_{3})_{2} and R′′ = HCMe_{2}, is an emerald green crystalline compound reported in 2004.

It was prepared by the reduction of the related tetrabrominated precursor by potassium graphite (KC_{8}). It is air- and moisture-sensitive but is a stable solid up to 128 °C.

The geometry of disilynes is unlike that of analogous carbon structures. Whereas substituted alkynes, such as 2-butyne, are linear, having a 180° bond angle at each end of the carbon–carbon triple bond, the Si−Si≡Si−Si chain is bent to 137° at each end. The four silicon atoms in the chain are however perfectly coplanar, with the first and fourth silicon atoms trans to one another. The central triple bond length is 206 pm, which is around 4% shorter than the typical bond-length of Si–Si double bonds (214 pm)) and the Si–Si single bonds are 237 pm. The color is attributed to a weak π–π^{*} transition.

Calculations show a bond order of 2.6. An alternative calculation of the bond order by a different group describes the bonding as essentially due to only two electron pairs, with the third pair in a non-bonding orbital. Reaction of this compound with phenylacetylene produced a 1,2-disilabenzene. Other workers have also reported another related compound which contains a hexasila-3-yne chain:

R_{3}Si(SiR_{3})SiMeSi_{2}SiMe(SiR_{3})SiR_{3}
where Me = methyl and R = t-butyl

In this compound, the Si–Si triple bond length was calculated as 207 pm.

== Heavier group 14 analogues ==
Triple bonded compounds of the heavier members of group 14 have also been prepared; lead, and tin and germanium (digermyne) The cores of the disilyne, digermyne, distannyne, and diplumbyne have similarly bent geometries. These findings are generally consistent with the absence of conventional triple bonds.

== See also ==
- Disilane
- Disilene
- Organosilicon compounds
