= Alfred Stock =

German inorganic chemist (1876–1946)

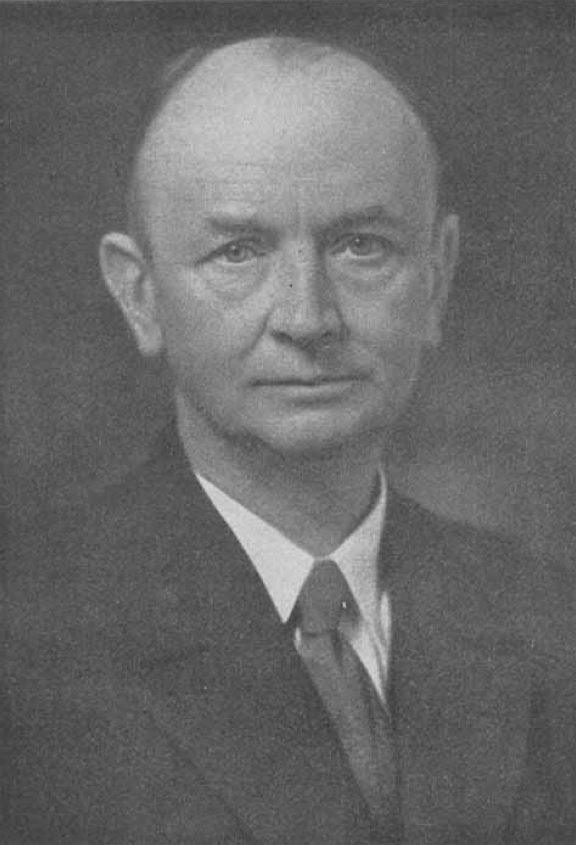
- Portrait of the German chemist Alfred Stock (1876 – 1946).
- Born: 16 July 1876; Danzig, German Empire
- Died: 12 August 1946 (aged 70); Aken an der Elbe, Soviet occupation zone of Germany
- Scientific career
- Fields: Chemistry
- Workplaces: University of Karlsruhe
- Doctoral advisor: Emil Fischer
- Doctoral students: H. J. Emeléus

Alfred Stock (July 16, 1876 – August 12, 1946) was a German inorganic chemist. He did pioneering research on the hydrides of boron and silicon, coordination chemistry, mercury, and mercury poisoning. The German Chemical Society's Alfred-Stock Memorial Prize is named after him.

== Life ==
Stock was born in Danzig (Gdańsk) and educated at the Friedrich-Werder grammar school in Berlin. In 1894 he began studies in chemistry at the Friedrich Wilhelm-University in Berlin. After finishing his dissertation about the quantitative separation of arsenic and antimony in the works of Emil Fischer he got his doctoral degree.

In 1899 he worked with the French chemist and toxicologist Henri Moissan in Paris for one year. He was given the task of synthesizing still unknown compounds of boron and silicon. Five years later he became professor at the University of Breslau. In 1916 he succeeded Richard Willstätter as director at the Kaiser Wilhelm Institute for Chemistry in Berlin. After a severe mercury poisoning he became the director of the Chemistry Department at the Technische Hochschule in Karlsruhe from 1926 to 1936. In 1932 he was a visiting professor at Cornell University in Ithaca, New York for four months.

A member of the Nazi Party since 1933, Stock was anti-Semitic. From February 6, 1936, to May 7, 1938 Stock was the president of the German Chemical Society. Bombs in the Second World War damaged the house of Stock. In September 1943 he and his wife moved to Bad Warmbrunn in Silesia, but the flow of refugees forced them to move again towards west in February 1945. They found accommodation in Aken (near Dessau). After the war in 1946, Stock endeavoured to revitalize German chemistry by lectures and memoirs. He was renowned for his pioneering research on boron hydrides.

== Research on the hydrides of boron and silicon ==
In 1909 Stock began studying the boron hydrides—the boron hydrogen chemical compounds with general formula B_{x}H_{y}—at Breslau. Due to their extreme reactivity and flammability in air, boron hydrides could not be purified until his development of methods for separation using high-vacuum manifolds around 1912. He performed similar work on the hydrides of silicon. The hydrides of boron and silicon represented the first family of binary compounds to approach the richness of hydrocarbons in terms of structural diversity. Not only did the boron hydrides exhibit challenging properties, their structures were also unusual. Elucidation of the structures and the associated bonding models dramatically expanded the scope of inorganic chemistry. Boron hydrides such as diborane later developed into a range of reagents for organic synthesis as well as a source of diverse ligands and building blocks for researchers. With Henri Moissan, Stock discovered silicon boride.

== Research in other areas of inorganic chemistry ==
In 1921, Stock first prepared metallic beryllium by electrolyzing a fused mixture of sodium and beryllium fluorides. This method made beryllium available for industrial use, such as in special alloys and glasses and for making windows in X-ray tubes.

He was also influential in coordination chemistry. The term "ligand" (from ligare Latin, to bind) was first used by Stock in 1917. H. Irving and R.J.P. Williams adopted the term in a paper published in 1948. Monodentate, bidentate, tridentate characterized the number of ligands attached to a metal. Given the introduction of ligand concept, he was also able to further derive the idea of bite angle and other aspects of chelation.

The "Stock system," first published in 1919, was a system of nomenclature on binary compounds. In his own words, he considered the system to be "simple, clear, immediately intelligible, capable of the most general application." In 1924, a German commission recommended Stock system to be adopted with some accommodations. FeCl_{2}, which would have been named iron(2)-chloride according to Stock's original idea, became iron(II) chloride in the revised proposal. In 1934 Stock agreed to the use of Roman numerals but preferred keeping the hyphen and dropping the parentheses. Although this suggestion has not been followed, the Stock system remains in use worldwide.

== Interests in mercury and mercury poisoning ==
Stock published over 50 papers on different aspects of mercury and mercury poisoning. He also introduced sensitive tests and devised improved laboratory techniques for dealing with mercury which minimized poisoning risk, possibly initiated by his chronic mercury poisoning in 1923, due to his use of liquid mercury in some novel laboratory apparatus he invented. He became more vocal on protesting the mercury usage after realizing the toxicity of its organic derivatives. German dentists abandoned his warning in 1928 against copper amalgam usage. Nevertheless, a paper from Fleischmann, in which removal of mercury in amalgam-related illness had led to complete recovery, supported his idea. (Deutsche Medizinische Wochenschrift 1928, No. 8). A committee was founded in Berlin to investigate cases of possible mercury intoxication and hence the term micromercurialism was first used.

== Retirement and death ==
After retirement in 1936, Stock moved from Karlsruhe to Berlin. He died in Aken, a small town near Dessau, in August 1946 at the age of 70.

== Posthumous recognition ==
In recognition of his contributions to the field of inorganic chemistry, the German Chemical Society (Gesellschaft Deutscher Chemiker) created in 1950 the Alfred Stock Memorial Prize. The prize, consisting of a gold medal and money, is awarded every other year for "an outstanding independent scientific experimental investigation in the field of inorganic chemistry."

== Publications ==
- Praktikum der quantitativen anorganischen Analyse. Berlin 1909, (6. Auflage, München 1979).
- Ultrastrukturchemie. Berlin 1920.
- Hydrides of boron and silicon. Ithaca(USA) 1933, (Neuausgabe Ithaca(UAS) 1957).
- Die Gefährlichkeit des Quecksilbers und der Amalgam-Zahnfüllungen. Berlin 1928.
- Das Atom In: Angewandte Chemie Band 37, Nr. 6, 1924, ISSN 1521-3757, doi:10.1002/ange.19240370602, S. 65–67.

== Inventions and discoveries ==
- the tension thermometer
- the Stock high vacuum apparatus - an apparatus made of glass which allows work with highly combustible and poisonous substances to be undertaken in high vacuum.
- the principles of the chemistry of metal-chelate complexes
- Stock nomenclature or the Stock system - the system of naming the oxidation state of an atom in a compound
