= Disilane =

Structural formula of disilane
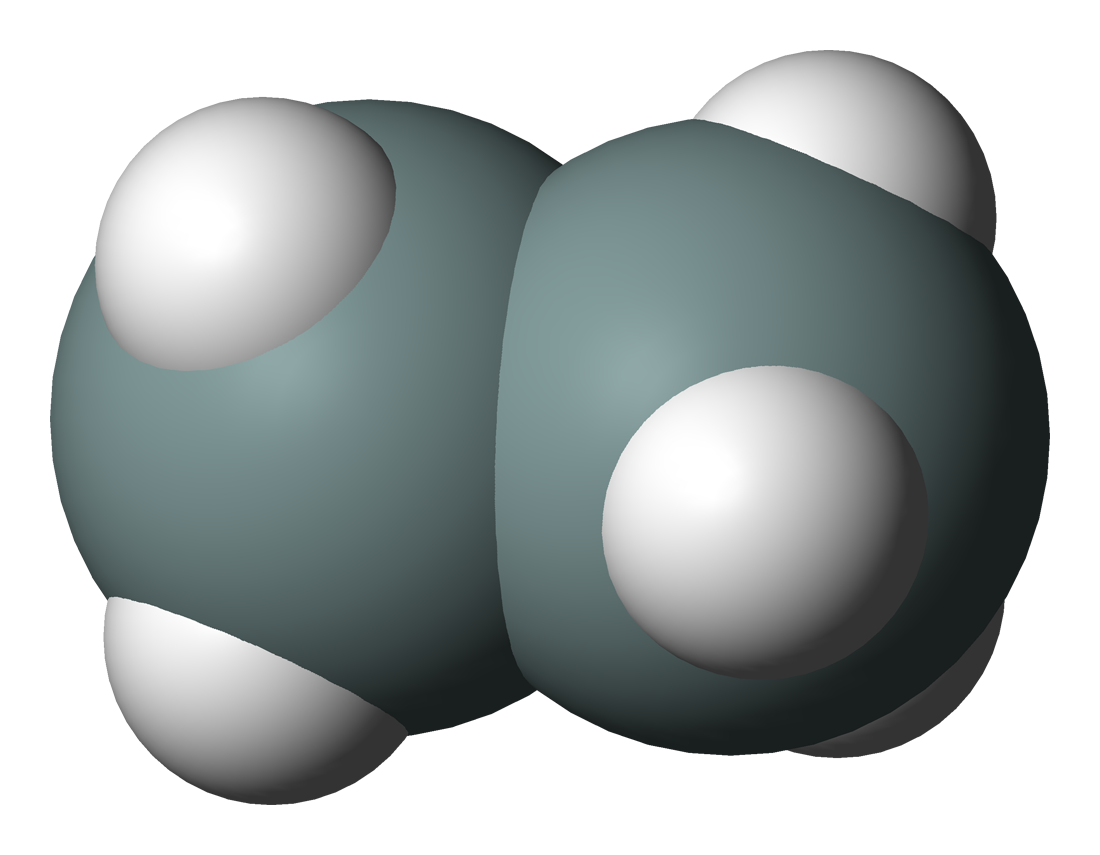
Spacefill model of disilane

Names
- IUPAC name Disilane

Identifiers
CAS Number	1590-87-0
3D model (JSmol)	Interactive image
ChEBI	CHEBI:30597
ChemSpider	66736
ECHA InfoCard	100.014.970
Gmelin Reference	368
PubChem CID	74123
UNII	L4684339WI
CompTox Dashboard (EPA)	DTXSID40166558
- InChI: InChI=1S/H6Si2/c1-2/h1-2H3 Key: PZPGRFITIJYNEJ-UHFFFAOYSA-N; InChI=1/H6Si2/c1-2/h1-2H3 Key: PZPGRFITIJYNEJ-UHFFFAOYAQ
- SMILES: [SiH3][SiH3]

Properties
Chemical formula	Si_{2}H_{6}
Molar mass	62.218 g·mol^{−1}
Appearance	Colourless gas
Density	2.7 g dm^{−3}
Melting point	−132 °C (−206 °F; 141 K)
Boiling point	−14 °C (7 °F; 259 K)
Solubility in water	Reacts
Vapor pressure	2940.2±0.0 mmHg at 25°C
Conjugate acid	Disilanium

Structure
Dipole moment	0 D

Hazards
- Occupational safety and health (OHS/OSH)
Main hazards	Extremely flammable
- GHS labelling
Pictograms	(GHS02: Flammable) (GHS04: Compressed Gas) (GHS07: Exclamation mark) (GHS08: Health hazard)
Signal word	Danger
Hazard statements	H220, H280, H312, H315, H319, H332, H334, H335, H340, H350
Precautionary statements	P203, P210, P222, P233, P260, P264, P264+P265, P271, P280, P284, P302+P352, P304+P340, P305+P351+P338, P317, P318, P319, P321, P332+P317, P337+P317, P342+P316, P362+P364, P377, P381, P403, P403+P233, P405, P410+P403, P501

Related compounds
Related disilanes	Hexamethyldisilane
Related compounds	Ethane; Digermane
- Except where otherwise noted, data are given for materials in their standard state (at 25 °C [77 °F], 100 kPa). verify (what is ?) Infobox references

Disilane is a chemical compound with the chemical formula Si_{2}H_{6} that was first identified in 1902 by Henri Moissan and Samuel Smiles (1877–1953). The term also generally refers to compounds of the form Si_{2}R_{6}. Moissan and Smiles reported disilane as being among the products formed by the action of dilute acids on metal silicides. Although these reactions had been previously investigated by Friedrich Woehler and Heinrich Buff between 1857 and 1858, Moissan and Smiles were the first to explicitly identify disilane. They referred to disilane as silicoethane. Higher members of the homologous series Si_{n}H_{2n+2} formed in these reactions were subsequently identified by Carl Somiesky (sometimes spelled "Karl Somieski") and Alfred Stock.

At standard temperature and pressure, disilane is a colourless, acrid gas. Disilane and ethane have similar structures, although disilane is much more reactive. Other compounds of the general formula Si_{2}X_{6} (X = hydrogen, halogen, alkyl, aryl, and mixtures of these groups) are called disilanes. Disilane is a group 14 hydride.

== Synthesis ==
Disilane is usually prepared by the hydrolysis of magnesium silicide. This reaction produces silane, disilane, and even trisilane. The method has been abandoned for the production of silane, but it remains viable for generating disilane. The presence of traces of disilane is responsible for the spontaneous flammability of silane produced by hydrolysis by this method (analogously diphosphine is often the spontaneously pyrophoric contaminant in samples of phosphine).

It also arises by thermal decomposition disilane via both photochemical and thermal decomposition of silane.

The reduction of Si_{2}Cl_{6} with lithium aluminium hydride affords disilane in modest yield.

== Applications and reactions ==
Disilane and silane thermally decompose around 640 °C, depositing amorphous silicon. This chemical vapor deposition process is relevant to the manufacture of photovoltaic devices. Specifically it is utilized in the production of silicon wafers.

More generally, diorganosilanes are produced by reductive coupling of silyl chlorides, e.g.

2 (CH_{3})_{3}SiCl + 2 Na → (CH_{3})_{3}Si−Si(CH_{3})_{3} + 2 NaCl

Disilane gas can be used to control pressure of Si vapors during process of graphene growth by thermal decomposition of SiC. Pressure of Si vapors influences quality of produced graphene.
