= Dimethylsilanediol =

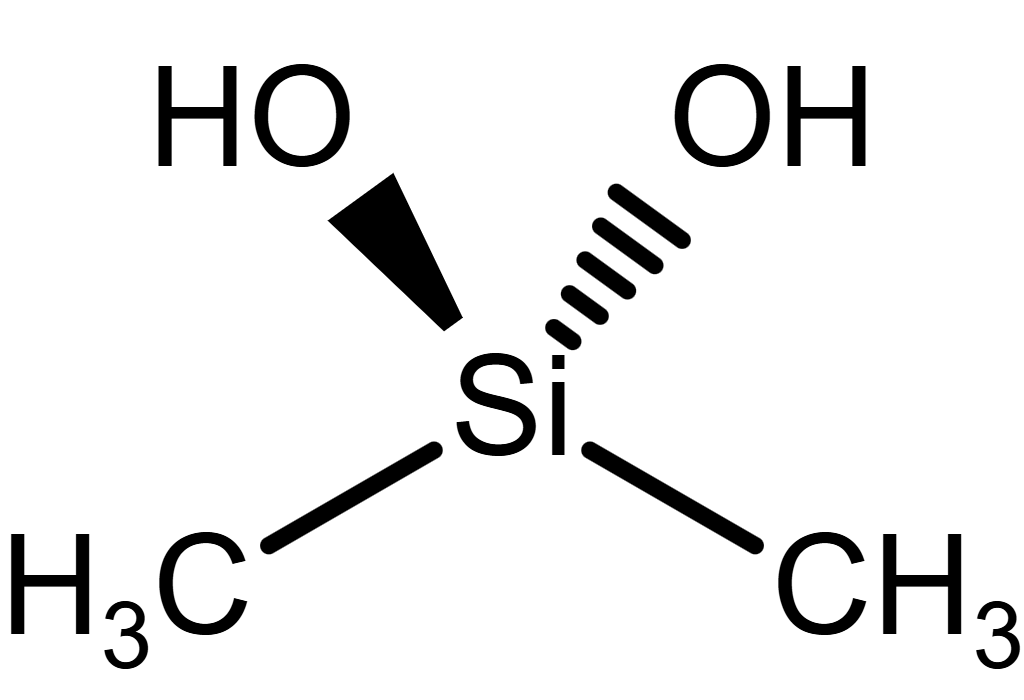

Names
- IUPAC name Dihydroxy(dimethyl)silane
- Other names: 1,1-Dimethylsilanediol; Dihydroxydimethylsilane; Dimethyldihydroxysilane; Dimethylsilanediol

Identifiers
CAS Number	1066-42-8
3D model (JSmol)	Interactive image
Beilstein Reference	1731569
ChEBI	CHEBI:23816
ChemSpider	13396
ECHA InfoCard	100.012.651
EC Number	213-915-7
Gmelin Reference	404726
PubChem CID	14014
UNII	DNZ4KJE28U
CompTox Dashboard (EPA)	DTXSID2061434
- InChI: InChI=1S/C2H8O2Si/c1-5(2,3)4/h3-4H,1-2H3 Key: XCLIHDJZGPCUBT-UHFFFAOYSA-N
- SMILES: C[Si](C)(O)O

Properties
Chemical formula	(CH_{3})_{2}Si(OH)_{2}
Molar mass	92.169 g·mol^{−1}
Appearance	Colorless or white crystalline solid
Density	1.097 g/cm^{3}
Melting point	101 °C (214 °F; 374 K)
Solubility in water	Highly soluble
Solubility	Slightly soluble in DMSO and methanol

Structure
Molecular shape	Tetrahedral at Si

Hazards
- GHS labelling
Pictograms	(GHS08: Health hazard)
Signal word	Warning
Hazard statements	H361
Precautionary statements	P203, P280, P318, P405, P501

Related compounds
Related compounds	Trimethylsilanol
- Except where otherwise noted, data are given for materials in their standard state (at 25 °C [77 °F], 100 kPa). Infobox references

Dimethylsilanediol or DMSD is an organosilicon compound with the chemical formula (CH_{3})_{2}Si(OH)_{2}. It is a colorless crystalline solid. It belongs to the category of silanols. Molecule of dimethylsilanediol has tetrahedral molecular geometry, where two methyl and two hydroxyl groups are attached to the central silicon atom. Dimethylsilanediol is a silicon analog of unstable propane-2,2-diol (CH_{3})_{2}C(OH)_{2}, where the central C atom is replaced by Si atom.

== Synthesis ==
Dimethylsilanediol is produced by hydrolysis of dichlorodimethylsilane.

(CH_{3})_{2}SiCl_{2} + 2 H_{2}O → (CH_{3})_{2}Si(OH)_{2} + 2 HCl

Dimethylsilanediol, while not sold commercially, has been demonstrated to be one of the degradation product of polydimethylsiloxane polymers and oligomers in the environment.

== Uses ==
It is a reaction intermediate in the synthesis of organosilicon compounds such as polydimethylsiloxane.

== Reactions and properties ==
Dimethylsilanediol readily polymerizes to give a mixture of polydimethylsiloxanes, primarily composed of the cyclomethicones octamethylcyclotetrasiloxane (D4), decamethylcyclopentasiloxane (D5), and dodecamethylcyclohexasiloxane (D6), but also containing a small amount of dimethiconol, the linear polymer. It is hygroscopic and temperature sensitive. It should be kept under inert atmosphere. Because it having two hydroxyl groups, it has ability to form hydrogen bonds, which enhances its solubility in polar solvents.
