= Silicone oil =

Any liquid polymerized siloxane with organic side chains

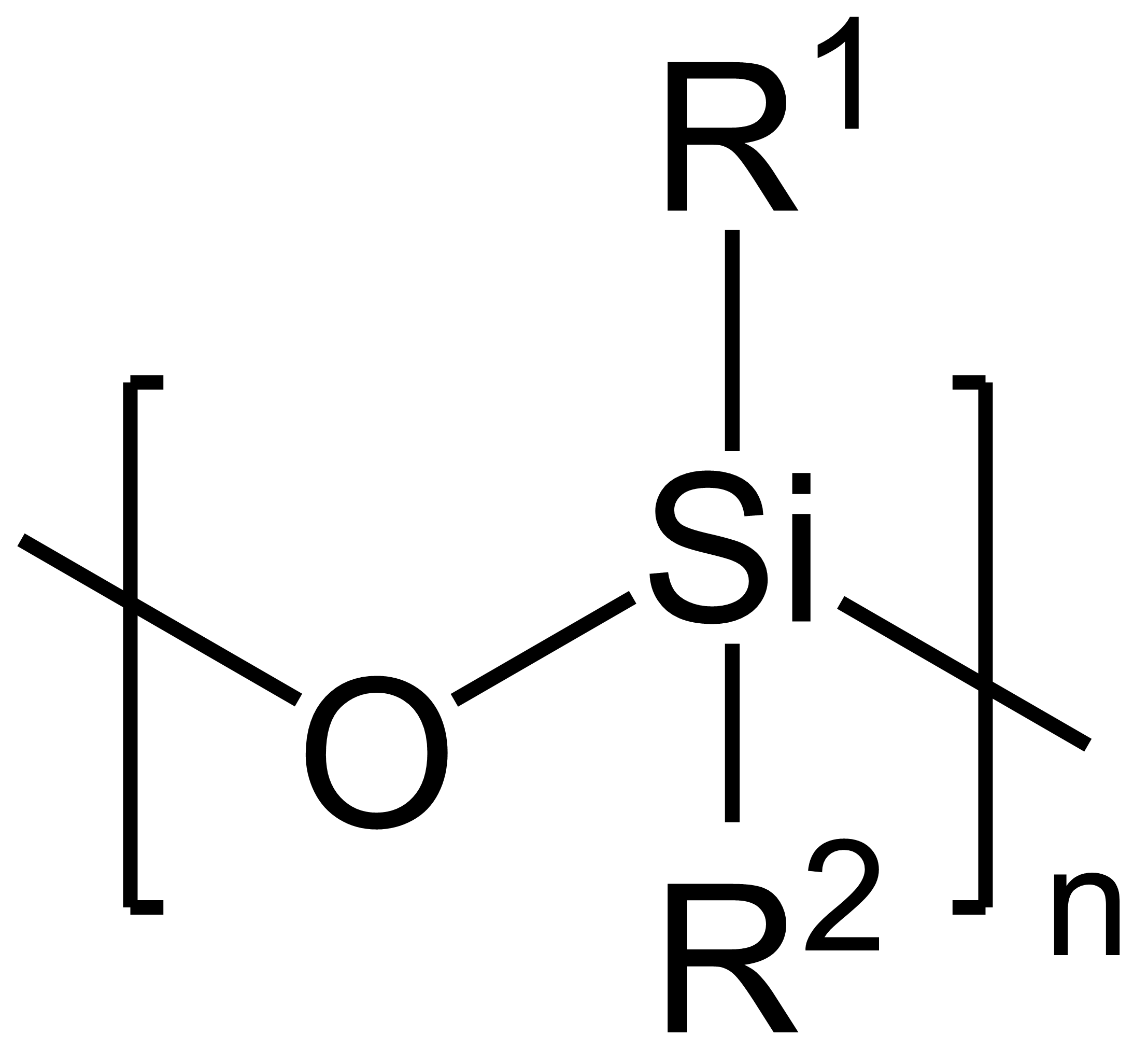
Polymer unit of the siloxane-bond

Silicone oil is any liquid polymerized siloxane with organic side chains. The most important member is polydimethylsiloxane. These polymers are of commercial interest because of their relatively high thermal stability and their lubricating properties.

== Structure ==
Like all siloxanes (e.g., hexamethyldisiloxane), the polymer backbone consists of alternating silicon and oxygen atoms (...Si−O−Si−O−Si...). Many groups can be attached to the tetravalent silicon centres, but the dominant substituent is methyl or sometimes phenyl. Many silicone liquids are linear polymers end-capped with trimethylsilyl groups. Other silicone liquids are cyclosiloxanes.

== Applications ==
Silicone oils are primarily used as lubricants, thermic fluid oils, or hydraulic fluids. They are excellent electrical insulators and, unlike their carbon analogues, are non-flammable. Their temperature stability and good heat-transfer characteristics make them widely used in laboratories for heating baths ("oil baths") placed on top of hotplate stirrers, as well as in freeze-dryers as refrigerants. Silicone oil is also commonly used as the working fluid in dashpots, wet-type transformers, diffusion pumps and in oil-filled heaters. Aerospace use includes the external coolant loop and radiators of the International Space Station Zvezda module, which rejects heat in the vacuum of space.

The class of silicone oils known as cyclosiloxanes has many of the same properties as other non-cyclic siloxane liquids but also has a relatively high volatility, making it useful in a number of cosmetic products such as antiperspirant.

Some silicone oils, such as simethicone, are potent anti-foaming agents due to their low surface tension. They are used in industrial applications such as distillation or fermentation, where excessive amounts of foam can be problematic. They are sometimes added to cooking oils to prevent excessive foaming during deep frying. Silicone oils used as lubricants can be inadvertent defoamers (contaminants) in processes where foam is desired, such as in the manufacture of polyurethane foam.

Silicone oil is also one of the two main ingredients in Silly Putty, along with boric acid.

=== Medical uses ===
Consumer products to control flatulence often contain silicone oil. Silicone oils have been used as a vitreous fluid substitute to treat difficult cases of retinal detachment, such as those complicated with proliferative vitreoretinopathy, large retinal tears, and penetrating ocular trauma. Additionally, silicone oil is used in general medicine and surgery. Because of silicone oil's water repellent and lubricating properties, it is considered an appropriate material to maintain surgical instruments. They are also used in digital rectal examinations (DRE).

=== Automotive use ===
Silicone oil has been commonly used as the fluid in the automobile Viscous Fan Coupling assemblies and is still being used in the newer electronic fan assemblies.

=== Research use ===
Silicone oil can also be used in microscopic imaging applications. To visualize cells in deep tissue sections, specially-made silicone oil can be placed between the objective lens and the glass coverslip holding the tissue sample. Doing so helps reduce spherical aberrations that optically distort key cellular features. Silicone oil reduces spherical aberration in deep tissue sections because the refractive index (R.I.) of silicone oil (η ≈ 1.40) aligns nicely with the R.I. of cell fluid (η ≈ 1.38) and displaces air between the objective and the coverslip that would otherwise result in an R.I. mismatch.
