= Organosilanols =

Organic compounds of the form R3–Si–OH

Structure of trimethylsilanol.

In organosilicon chemistry, organosilanols are a group of chemical compounds derived from silicon. More specifically, they are carbosilanes derived with a hydroxy group (−OH) on the silicon atom. Organosilanols are the silicon analogs to alcohols. Silanols are more acidic and more basic than their alcohol counterparts and therefore show a rich structural chemistry characterized by hydrogen bonding networks which are particularly well studied for silanetriols.

== Preparation ==
Organosilanols can be obtained by hydrolysis of organohalosilanes, such as chlorotrimethylsilane. They can also be prepared by the oxidation of organosilanes with oxidizing agents (R = organic residue):

$$\ce{R2SiCl2{} + 2 HgO ->[-80^{\circ}C][toluene] R2Si(OH)2{} + 2 Hg^0}$$

or by hydrolysis in the alkaline:

$$\ce{(H3C)3SiCl + H2O -> (H3C)3SiOH + HCl}$$
$$\ce{R3SiH + H2O -> R3SiOH + H2}$$

The hydrolysis of silyl ethers generally proceeds only slowly:

$$\ce{(H5C2)3SiOC2H5 + H2O -> (H5C2)3SiOH + HOC2H5}$$

Hydrolysis of organosilanes is a first-order reaction. The hydrolysis rate of the Si-H bond depends on the type and number of organic residues. Thus, the hydrolysis rate of trialkylsilanes is significantly slower than that of triarylsilanes. This can be explained by a stronger increase in electron density on the silicon atom by the alkyl groups. Correspondingly, the reaction rate of the tri-n-alkylsilanes decreases in the series of ethyl, propyl, butyl groups. Trialkylsilanes with n-alkyl residues react by a factor of 10 faster than the analogous silanes with branched alkyl residues.

== Classification ==
Depending on the substitution pattern of the silicon atom, a further distinction can be made. Organosilanols are classified as:

- organosilanetriols, when three hydroxy groups and an organic residue are bound to a silicon atom, e. g. methylsilanetriol, phenylsilanetriol
- organosilandiols, when two hydroxy groups and two organic residues are bound to a silicon atom, e. g. dimethylsilanediol, diphenylsilanediol
- organosilanols, when one hydroxy group and three organic residues are bound to a silicon atom, e. g. trimethylsilanol, triethylsilanol or triphenylsilanol.
