= Silsesquioxane =

Molecular compound with applications in ceramics

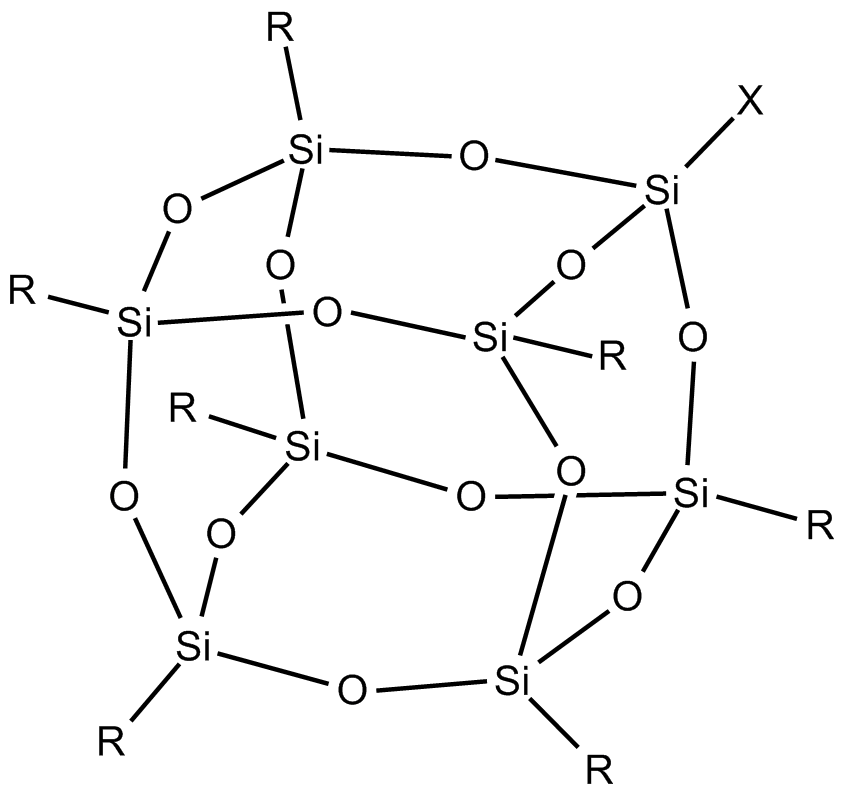
A cubic silsesquioxane

A silsesquioxane is an organosilicon compound with the chemical formula [RSiO_{3/2}]_{n} (R = H, alkyl, aryl, alkenyl or alkoxyl.). Silsesquioxanes are colorless solids that adopt cage-like or polymeric structures with Si-O-Si linkages and tetrahedral Si vertices. Silsesquioxanes are members of polyoctahedral silsesquioxanes ("POSS"), which have attracted attention as preceramic polymer precursors to ceramic materials and nanocomposites. Diverse substituents (R) can be attached to the Si centers. The molecules are unusual because they feature an inorganic silicate core and an organic exterior. The silica core confers rigidity and thermal stability.

== Structure ==
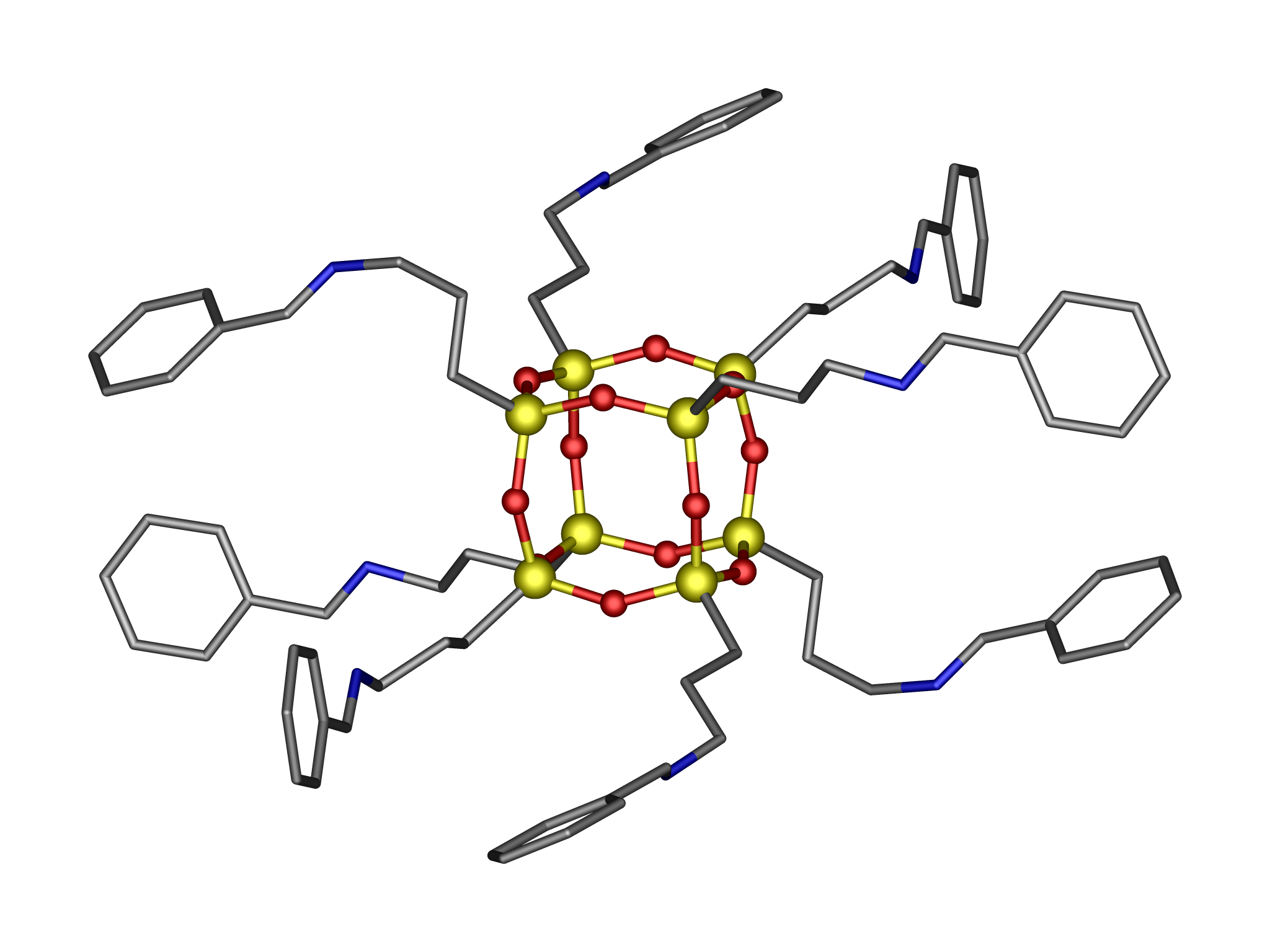
Molecular structure of imine-silsesquioxane

Silsesquioxanes are known in molecular form as well as polymers. The 6-, 8-, 10-, and 12-Si cages are sometimes labeled T_{6} T_{8}, T_{10}, and T_{12}, respectively (T = tetrahedral vertex). The T_{8} cages, the most widely studied members, have the formula [RSiO_{3/2}]_{8}, or equivalently R_{8}Si_{8}O_{12}. In all cases each Si center is bonded to three doubly bridging oxo groups, which in turn connect to other Si centers. The fourth group on Si is usually an alkyl, halide, hydride, alkoxide, etc. In the cubic clusters with O_{h} symmetry the Si-O-Si angles are in the range 145–152°, being bowed out, allowing the Si centers to better adopt tetrahedral geometry. The O-Si-O angle are in the range: 107–112°, Si-O bond: 1.55–1.65 Å.

== Synthesis ==
Silsesquioxanes are usually synthesized by hydrolysis of organotrichlorosilanes. An idealized synthesis is:

8 RSiCl_{3} + 12 H_{2}O → [RSiO_{3/2}]_{8} + 24 HCl

The formation of HCl negatively impacts the relative rates of hydrolysis and condensation of intermediate silanols. Consequently, silsesquioxanes can be obtained directly by condensation of the corresponding silanetriols which occurs at neutral pH and works even for sterically very bulky substituents.

8 RSi(OH)_{3} → [RSiO_{3/2}]_{8} + 12 H_{2}

== Reactivity ==
=== Substituent modifications ===
Depending on the R substituent, the exterior of cage can be further modified. When R = H, the Si-H group can undergo hydrosilylation or oxidation to the silanol. Bridged polysilsesquioxanes are most readily prepared from clusters that contain two or more trifunctional silyl groups attached to non-hydrolysable silicon-carbon bonds, with typical sol-gel processing. Vinyl-substituted silsesquioxanes can be linked by the alkene metathesis.

=== Cage-Rearrangement ===
Reorganization of the siloxane cage-like core (T_{8} → T_{10}) can be induced by trifluoromethanesulfonic acid (CF_{3}SO_{3}H). In this case, reaction of hexahedral silsesquioxane and CF_{3}SO_{3}H in DMSO conducted in 1 : 12 molar ratio gives heptahedral silsesquioxane. In the first step CF_{3}SO_{3}H acid attacks siloxane Si-O-Si bonds and the formation of Si-O-SO_{2}CF_{3} bond, opening one edge of the cage (Figure below). Such an inversion is observed at silicon atom during nucleophilic displacement reaction that is usually noticed when leaving groups are replaced by soft nucleophiles. Upon further acid attack, both T_{6}(OH)_{4} C and siloxane dimer D are formed. Because this reaction takes place in an aqueous conditions, compound E of general formula T_{8}(OH)_{4} as a consequence of hydrolysis reaction was obtained. E is prone to reaction with D and due to this, the abstraction of CF_{3}SO^{−}_{3} anion occurs and the closure frame with the spontaneous cage-rearrangement to heptahedral T_{10} structure F is observed. Although, heptahedral F is less favorable energetically (MM2 data), in this case its creation is forces by the formation of a new Si_{4}O_{4} moiety from much more less stable substrates D and E.

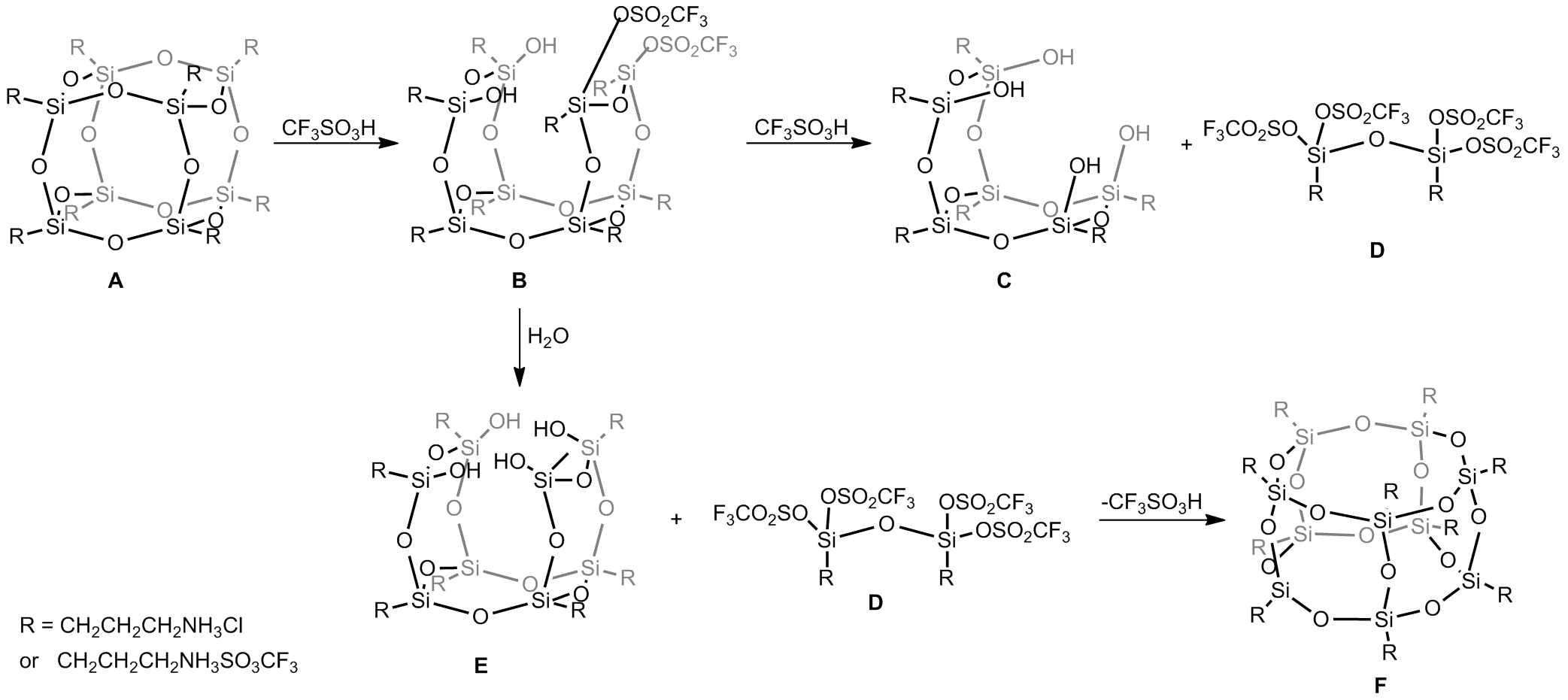
Reaction of OAS-POSS-Cl with CF_{3}SO_{3}H in DMSO. B-E constitute intermediates isolated during A → F cage-rearrangement.

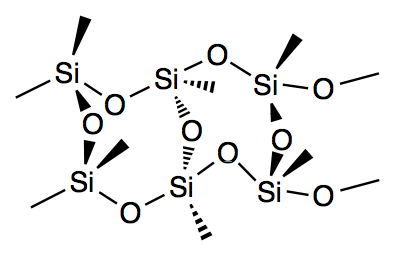
Poly(phenylsilsesquioxane) does not adopt a cage structure, but is a polymer with a ladder-like repeating unit.

=== Polymeric silsesquioxanes ===
Polymeric silsesquioxanes have been prepared starting with the hydrolysis of phenyltrichlorosilane. Hierarchical organic-inorganic (hybrid) polysilsesquioxane (PSQ) materials using polyhedral oligomeric silsesquioxanes (POSS) cages as singular building blocks of the inorganic framework exhibit high specific surface area and hydrothermal stability and micro and/or mesoporosity, making it attractive for fire protection applications. In addition, Marchesi et al. developed a series of amorphous POSS-based polysilsesquioxanes, in which the POSS cages (of partially-condensed T_{7}-POSS or anionic completely-condensed T_{8}-POSS molecules) act as structural units of the polymer-like inorganic network, both alone or in conjunction with metal ions of the lanthanide series (europium and terbium, especially).

=== Hydridosilsesquioxanes ===
A well-known hydrogen silsesquioxane is [HSiO_{3/2}]_{8}. Early syntheses involved treatment (protonation) of trichlorosilane with concentrated sulfuric acid, and fuming sulfuric acid, affording T_{10}-T_{16} oligomers. The T_{8} cluster was also synthesized by the reaction of trimethylsilane. The Si-H groups are amenable to hydrosilylation.

== Applications ==
Some high molecular weight soluble polymethylsilsesquioxanes have found applications in cosmetics. resins, and lithography due to its thermal, chemical, and mechanical stability.

== Potential applications ==
=== Electronic materials ===
Films of organosilsesquioxane, e.g., poly(methylsilsesquioxane), have been examined for semiconducting devices. Poly(hydridosilsesquioxane), which has a linked-cage structure, was sold under the name Fox Flowable Oxide.

Methylsilsesquioxanes have been examined for spin-on-glass (SOG) dielectrics. Bridged silsesquioxanes have been used for quantum confined nano-size semiconductors. Silsesquioxane resins have also been used for these applications because they have high dielectric strengths, low dielectric constants, high volume resistivities, and low dissipation factors, making them very suitable for electronics applications. These resins have heat and fire resistant properties, which can be used to make fiber-reinforced composites for electrical laminates.

Polyhedral oligomeric silsesquioxanes have been examined as a means to give improved mechanical properties and stability, with an organic matrix for good optical and electrical properties. The mechanisms of degradation in these devices is not well understood, but it is believed that material defect understanding is important for understanding the optical and electronic properties.

Hydridosilsesquioxanes can be converted to silica coatings for potential application in integrated circuits.

=== LEDs ===
For potential applications to light emitting diodes, cubic silsesquioxanes. have been functionalized. One of the first precursors used in light emitting application was octadimethylsiloxysilsesquioxane, which can be prepared in yields of >90% by treating tetraethoxysilane or rice hull ash with tetramethylammonium hydroxide followed by dimethylchlorosilane. The general method of hydrolyzing organotrichlorosilanes is still effective here. When brominated or aminated, these structures can be coupled with epoxies, aldehydes, and bromoaromatics, which enable attachment of these silsesquioxanes to π-conjugated polymers. These methods can use copolymerization techniques, Grignard reagents, and different coupling strategies. There has also been research on the ability of conjugated dendrimer silsesquioxanes to behave as light emitting materials. Though, highly branched substituents tend to have π-π interactions, which hinder high luminescent quantum yield.

=== Sensors ===
For chemosensor applications, silsesquioxane cages conjugated with fluorescent molecules can be directly used to detect fluoride ions under a cage-encapsulation showing a change of color under naked eyes and other anions.

=== Antimicrobial silsesquioxanes ===
Silsesquioxanes have been functionalized with biocidal quaternary ammonium (QASs) groups to produce antimicrobial coatings. QASs are disinfectants, antiseptics, and antifoulants. The relatively small size of the silsesquioxanes, 2-5 nm, allows a QAS functionalized molecule to have a charge density similar to that of some dendrimers and thus the antimicrobial efficacy is prominent. Dimethyl-n-octylamine was quaternized by octa(3-chloropropylsilsesquioxane), (T-ClPr)_{8}.

Array of QAS functionalized polyhedral oligomeric silsesquioxanes (Q-POSS) have been reported. These researchers varied the alkyl chain length from –C_{12}H_{25} to –C_{18}H_{37} and varied the counter ion between chloride, bromide, and iodine. The first reaction was the hydrosilylation between allydimethlamine and octasilane polyhedral oligomeric silsesquioxane via Karstedt's catalyst to make a tertiaryamino-functionalized silsesquioxane. The second step was the quaternization of the tertiaryamino groups with an alkyl halide. The alkyl halides used were 1-iodooctadecane, 1-bromohexadecane, and 1-chloroctadecane.

The silsesquioxane core in these hybrid materials provides an increased glass transition temperature, improved mechanical properties, higher use temperature, and lower flammability. These desirable properties combined with the ability to readily functionalize a silsesquioxane with multiple antimicrobial groups allows for robust biocides with higher charge densities while maintaining a compact molecular structure. The organic functionalities provide high compatibility with polymers allowing for easy incorporation into many mediums. Of particular interest are silicone paints and coatings used in hospitals. Typical biocidal ammonium functionalized polymers are incompatible, but silsesquioxanes closely mimic the silicone structure. A silicone-based paint combined with QAS-functionalized silsesquioxanes could be used to paint medical and sanitary devices, biomedical devices, exam equipment, medical storage rooms, hospital rooms, clinics, doctor offices, etc. to prevent the formation and spread of bacteria. For example, the Q-POSS developed was combined with polydimethylsiloxane and catalysis to form a crosslinked network. The researchers found that coatings based on bromide and chloride had the best antimicrobial efficacy.

== Partially condensed silsesquioxanes: Si_{7} species ==
A well studied example of a partially condensed silsesquioxanes is the trisilanol Cy_{7}Si_{7}O_{9}(OH)_{3}, prepared by the slow (months) hydrolysis of trichlorocyclohexylsilane (C_{6}H_{11}SiCl_{3}). The same cage can be prepared by acid-mediated cleavage of fully condensed silsesquioxane. This process results in silanediols that can further be used to create new metallasilsesquioxanes. These partially condensed silsesquioxanes are intermediates en route to the fully condensed cages.

In general, such silsesquioxane trisilanols form discrete dimers in the solid held together by cooperatively enhanced cyclic hydrogen bonded networks. These dimers are retained in solution and a dynamic equilibrium has been elucidated using NMR.

=== Other partially condensed silsesquioxanes ===
Partially condensed silsesquioxane

Other partially condensed species adopt ladder structures wherein in which two long chains composed of RSiO_{3/2} units are connected at regular intervals by Si-O-Si bonds. Amorphous structures include RSiO_{3/2} unit connections without any organized structure formation.

$\begin{array}{ll} \ce{{RSiZ3} + 3H2O -> {RSi(OH)3} + 3HZ} & \text{hydrolysis} \\ \ce{3RSi(OH)3 ->[\text{cat.}] 3RSiO_{3/2}} + 4.5\ce{H2O} & \text{condensation} \\ \ce{{RSi(OH)3} + RSiZ3 ->[\text{cat.}] {2RSiO_{3/2}} + 3HZ} & \text{condensation} \\ \mathrm{Z = OR', Cl, OAc} & \text{cat. = catalyst} \end{array}$
Scheme for the synthesis of silsesquioxanes

=== Metal complexes of partially condensed silsesquioxanes and metal-containing POSS ===
The incompletely condensed silsesquioxanes bind numerous metals, including Na^{+}, Li^{+}, and Be^{2+} as well as transition metals. Cubic metal-silsesquioxane derivatives of the core stoichiometry MSi_{7}O_{12} can be prepared by treating the incomplete cage with a metal halide in the presence of a base such as triethylamine. Another route of synthesis involves first deprotonating the trisilanol group using strong bases such as LiN(SiMe_{3})_{2}. rare-earth-doped POSS were prepared from heptaisobutyl trisilanol T_{7}-POSS ((C_{4}H_{9})_{7}Si_{7}O_{9}(OH)_{3}) with EuCl_{3}. Furthermore, a combination of partially-condensed tetrasilanolphenyl POSS with terbium acetate and/or europium acetate lead to novel double-decker silsesquioxane (DDSQ) materials consisting of lanthanide-doped POSS units with intrinsic luminescent properties, in which the lanthanide ion(s) act as both structural and functional agents in the final compound.

=== Catalytic properties ===
Although lacking commercial applications, metallasilsesquioxanes have been investigated as catalysts and models for heterogenerous catalysts. The coordination environment provided by Cy_{7}Si_{7}O_{9}(OH)_{3} has been proposed to approximate that of silica-based catalyst supports. Some of these complexes catalyze alkene metathesis, polymerization, epoxidation, and Diels-Alder reactions. They serve as Lewis acid-catalysts for Oppenauer oxidation and Meerwein-Pondorf-Verley reductions. A number of metallasilsesquioxanes have been reported that can polymerize ethylene, akin to the Phillips catalyst. The catalyst is activated with trimethylaluminum and typically proceeds with high turnover number. As ligands, the silsesquioxane frameworks are approximately as electron-withdrawing as a trifluoromethyl group.

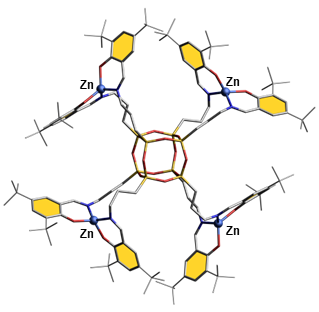
X-ray crystal structure of Zn4@POSS-1

One of the few crystallographically characterized metalated silsesquioxane-based catalytic systems involves the use of silsesquioxanes as soluble models for tethered osmium(IV) and rhodium(II) complexes. A mononuclear organopalladium-functionalized T_{8}-Pd POSS functions as an active homogeneous catalyst for the Suzuki–Miyaura cross-coupling reaction. A Zn_{4}-POSS catalyzes the cycloaddition of carbon dioxide (CO_{2}) with terminal epoxides, using tetrabutylammonium iodide (TBAI) as a co-catalyst.
