= Tris(silox)tantalum =

Names
- IUPAC name Tantalum(3+) tris[tris(2-methyl-2-propanyl)silanolate]

Identifiers
3D model (JSmol)	Interactive image
ChemSpider	73947870
- InChI: InChI=1S/3C12H27OSi.Ta/c3*1-10(2,3)14(13,11(4,5)6)12(7,8)9;/h3*1-9H3;/q3*-1;+3 Key: LMZCAXMQARHFFT-UHFFFAOYSA-N
- SMILES: CC(C)(C)[Si](O[Ta](O[Si](C(C)(C)C)(C(C)(C)C)C(C)(C)C)O[Si](C(C)(C)C)(C(C)(C)C)C(C)(C)C)(C(C)(C)C)C(C)(C)C

Properties
Chemical formula	C_{36}H_{81}O_{3}Si_{3}Ta
Molar mass	827.244 g·mol^{−1}
Appearance	Light blue crystalline solid
- Except where otherwise noted, data are given for materials in their standard state (at 25 °C [77 °F], 100 kPa). Infobox references

Tris(silox)tantalum, Ta(SiO^{t}Bu_{3})_{3}, is an organotantalum complex bound with three siloxide (this siloxide has three tert-butyl groups attached to silicon, attached via oxygen (^{t}Bu_{3}SiO^{−})) ligands. The tantalum center has a d-electron count of 2 and an oxidation state of III. The complex is trigonal planar whose point group is assigned as D_{3h}. It is a crystalline light blue solid which forms blue-green solutions in tetrahydrofuran (THF).

== Synthesis ==
The synthesis of tris(silox)tantalum was first reported in 1986 by Lapointe, Wolczanzki, and Mitchell. The precursor, (silox)_{3}TaCl_{2}, is obtained by reacting TaCl_{5} with 3 equivalents of Na(silox) at reflux in toluene. Then, (silox)_{3}TaCl_{2} is reduced to the synthetic target tris(silox)tantalum using 0.9% Na/Hg (4.0 eq. Na) in THF cooled in dry ice bath and stirred at room temperature for two hours.

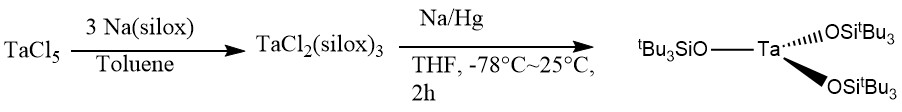

== Reactivity ==
=== Reaction with π bonds ===
Tris(silox)tantalum tends to react with C-C and C-O π bonds oxidatively to form a Ta(V) center and two single Ta-C bonds or one single Ta-C and one single Ta-O bonds, respectively:

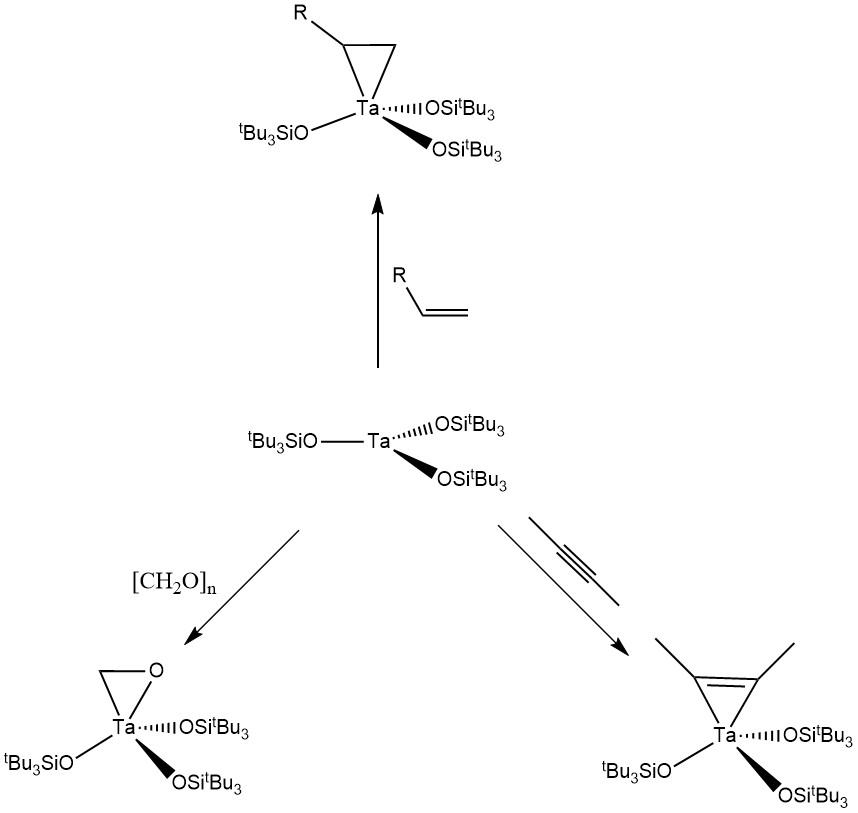

=== Special coordinating reaction with pyridine and benzene in η^{2} mode ===
Compared with traditional "sandwich" complexes - ferrocene and bisbenzene(chromium), for example - in which a metal center binds with cyclic conjugated hydrocarbon compounds such as the cyclopentadienyl anion or benzene with the maximum hapticity possible, tris(silox)tantalum coordinates with pyridine and benzene in the η^{2} mode due to its substantial reducing power and steric properties. In this structure, while both CI-C2 (1.328(16)A) and C3-C4(1.312(22)A) exhibit double bond distances, the distances of N-C1, N-C5, C2-C3, and C4-C5 are longer than normal pyridine molecule. The distances of Ta-N and Ta-C5 are short as well. This supports the fact that pyridine's aromaticity has been disrupted by the coordination of the tantalum center whose oxidation state can be assigned as V with C5 and N acting both as X-type ligand. Similar case can be found when a concentrated amount of tris(silox)tantalum stands in benzene for 10–14 days. Here, a bridging benzene molecule binds with two molecules of tris(silox)Ta, whose unequal bonding distances between tantalum and carbon illustrate the unusual asymmetric binding mode between the Ta center and the benzene molecule. In contrast, in the bis(benzene)chromium complex, chromium binds with the two benzene ligand symmetrically, whose Cr-C distances are all 2.142 Å.

=== Reverse dative interaction with borane, a strong Lewis acid ===
Upon reacting tris(silox)Ta with excess borane–tetrahydrofuran (BH_{3}·THF), tris(silox)·BH_{3} is obtained:

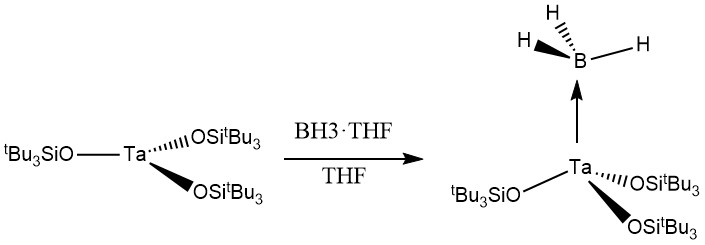

IR spectrum of tris(silox)·BH_{3} shows two sharp peaks at 2445 and 2395 cm^{−1} assigned to be B-H stretching motions and another peak at 1290 cm^{−1} assigned to be B-H bending motions. The corresponding deuterated compound tris(silox)·BD_{3} is synthesized whose IR spectrum of B-D stretching and B-D bending motions are measured. As the ratio, v_{BH}/v_{BD}, is close with the value predicted by a reduced mass calculation, the BH3 adduct is considered to have simple BH vibrations without strong coupling to other modes.

Tris(silox)·BH_{3} does not decompose after being heated in benzene at 90 °C for 24 hours; it does not show reaction with excess ethylene or trimethylamine; the barrier of dissociative exchange with BH3·THF is measured to be greater than 19 kcal/mol.

=== Insertions ===
After stirring the mixture of tris(silox)tantalum and 1,2-dihydrofuran in hexane at room temperature overnight, tris(silox)tantalum inserts into the C-O single bond through a manner of oxidative addition:

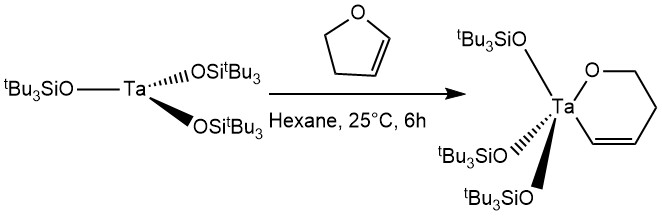

Tris(silox)tantalum can also react with hydrogen gas to form the corresponding dihydride with the Ta(V) center.

=== Arsinidine, phosphinidene, and imide formation ===
As tris(silox)Ta reacts with PhAsH_{2}, PhPH_{2}, and PhNH_{2}, the corresponding pnictide hydride is formed through oxidative addition which will lose H_{2} to form the pnictinidene complex:

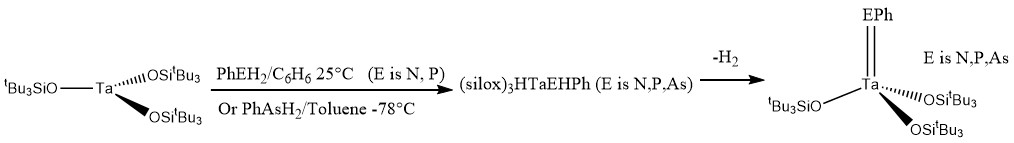

According to the crystal structure, the tantalum center of the pnictinidene complex has the geometry close to tetrahedral.

In addition, other similar pnictinidine products such as tris(silox)Ta=EH were also synthesized utilizing the corresponding pnictogen hydride EH_{3} as the starting material.

=== Reaction with P_{4} ===
Tris(silox)Ta reacts with half-equivalent of P_{4} in toluene for 6 hours to give the compound [(silox)3Ta]2 (μ:η^{1} ,η^{1} -P2):

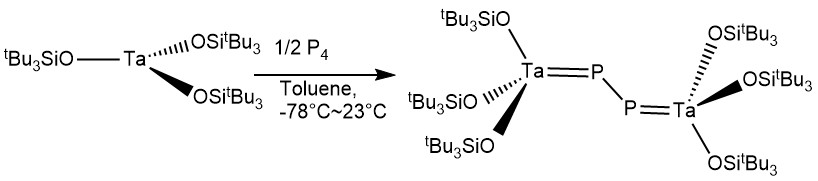

The P-Ta bond distances in this molecule are 2.3158 Å, consistent with a phosphorus-tantalum double bond.

=== Carbon monoxide cleavage ===
When exposed to carbon monoxide, tris(silox)tantalum takes half equivalent of CO to form half equivalent of (silox)_{3}Ta=O and an intriguing bridging dicarbide Ta(V) species: According to the crystal structure, the two tantalum centers in this compound have a tetrahedral geometry. The distance between the two bridging carbon is 1.37 Å, which is in the range of a carbon-carbon double bond; in addition, the Ta-C-C' bond angle is 173°, further confirming the π bonding of the Ta-C-C'-Ta' system.

The main pathway of the mechanism of this reaction is illustrated below without the solvent adducts:

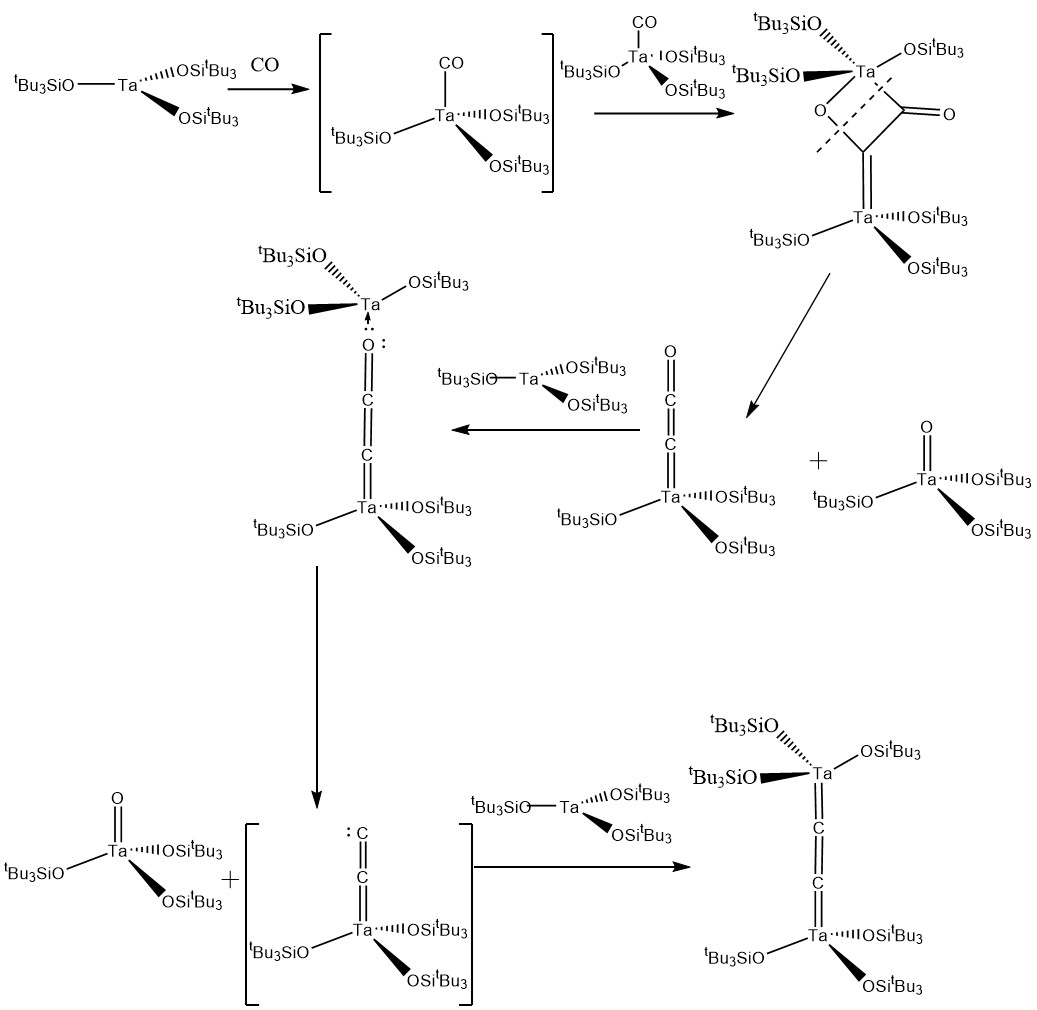

First, carbon monoxide adds to tris(silox)tantalum to form an unstable tetrahedral intermediate, which quickly dimerizes. Then, the cleavage of the four-membered ring as shown in the diagram results in the formation of the tris(silox)Ta=O and a ketenylidene species. This ketenylidene combines with tris(silox)tantalum which abstracts the termino oxo to form the transient vinylidene. Lastly, the vinylidene reacts with another tris(silox)tantalum to form the bridging dicarbide complex.
