= Siloxide =

Group of chemical compounds

Siloxides are chemical compounds with the formula R_{3}SiOM, where R is usually an organic group and M is usually a metal cation. Also called silanolates, they are derived by deprotonation of silanols. They also arise by the degradation of siloxanes by base:

R_{3}SiOSiR_{3} + 2 NaOH → 2 R_{3}SiONa + H_{2}O

Cleavage of cyclic siloxanes affords siloxides:

(Me_{2}SiO)_{3} + MeLi → Me_{3}SiOSiMe_{2}OSiMe_{2}OLi

These anions function as ligands for metal ions, forming complexes similar to metal alkoxides. Sodium trimethylsiloxide is useful for generating metal complexes by salt metathesis reactions. A very bulky siloxide is tert-butyl_{3}SiO^{−}, sometimes called silox.

Siloxides are weaker net donors than alkoxides because p_{π}-d donation has to compete with backbonding from the oxygen atom into the low-lying Si-C σ^{*} orbitals.
