= Europium(III) chromate =

Europium(III) chromate(V)
Names
- IUPAC name Europium(III) chromate(V)
- Other names: Europium chromate; Europium(3+) chromate

Identifiers
CAS Number	60746-51-2
3D model (JSmol)	Interactive image
- InChI: InChI=1S/Cr.Eu.4O/q;+3;;3*-1 Key: QYGFCRGOCJDKFZ-UHFFFAOYSA-N
- SMILES: [O-][Cr](=O)([O-])[O-][Eu+3]

Properties
Chemical formula	EuCrO_{4}
Molar mass	267.956 g·mol^{−1}
Density	5.39 g/cm^{−3}
Melting point	700 °C (1,292 °F; 973 K)
- Except where otherwise noted, data are given for materials in their standard state (at 25 °C [77 °F], 100 kPa). Infobox references

Europium(III) chromate is a chemical compound composed of europium, chromium and oxygen with europium in the +3 oxidation state, chromium in the +5 oxidation state and oxygen in the −2 oxidation state. It has the chemical formula of EuCrO_{4}.

== Properties ==
Europium(III) chromate crystallizes tetragonally with space group I4_{1}/amd (No. 141) with lattice parameters a = 722.134(1) and c = 632.896(1) pm with four formula units per unit cell.

The Néel temperature of europium(III) chromate is 15.9 K (−257.2 °C; −431.0 °F). Above 700 °C, europium(III) chromate begins to decompose into europium chromite (EuCrO_{3}).

2 EuCrO_{4} → 2 EuCrO_{3} + O_{2}

== Preparation ==
To obtain europium(III) chromate, an equimolar solution of europium(III) acetate and chromium(IV) oxide is dried in a vacuum at 70 °C and then heated to 400 °C in air. Another way to obtain europium(III) chromate is by reacting stoichiometric amounts of europium(III) nitrate hexahydrate and chromium(III) nitrate nonahydrate for 30 minutes at 433 K (160 °C; 320 °F), 30 minutes at 473 K (200 °C; 392 °F) and then 1 hour at 853 K (580 °C; 1,076 °F). A constant stream of oxygen is passed over the reaction mixture. An oxygen flow is used to stabilise the +5 oxidation state of chromium.

Eu(NO_{3})_{3}·6H_{2}O + Cr(NO_{3})_{3}·9H_{2}O → EuCrO_{4} + 6 NO_{2} + 15 H_{2}O + O_{2}
