= Zona Libre (lotion) =

Lotion produced in Argentina

Zona Libre is a lotion produced in Argentina. It is used to fight lice. It is recommended for children from ages 2 to 12. The product is available in various colors, including red, green and blue.

Zona Libre contains pharmacapil as an ingredient. Various versions of the product use other ingredients, such as dimeticone, aloe vera, acetic acid and others.

Zona Libre is sold through Argentina and Uruguay. The product sponsors several Telefe television programs.
