= Silyl protecting groups =

In organic chemistry, various triorganosilyl compounds are used as protecting groups. The simplest is the trimethylsilyl group, but others are known.

== Methylsilyl groups ==
In an NMR spectrum, signals from atoms in trimethylsilyl groups in compounds will commonly have chemical shifts close to the tetramethylsilane reference peak at 0 ppm. Also compounds, such as high temperature silicone "stopcock" grease, which have polysiloxanes (often called silicones) in them will commonly show peaks from their methyl groups (attached to the silicon atoms) having NMR chemical shifts close to the tetramethylsilane standard peak, such as at 0.07 ppm in CDCl_{3}.

== Super silyl groups ==
Related to trimethylsilyl groups are the supersilyl groups, a silicon atom connected to three tert-butyl groups. They are substantially bulkier than trimethylsilyls and can inhibit oligomerization.

== Hyper silyl groups ==
Three trimethylsilyl groups substituting on a silicon atom make a hypersilyl or tri(trimethylsilyl)silyl group (TTMSS or TMS_{3}Si):

the tri(trimethylsilyl)silyl group

The TTMSS group was first proposed in 1993 by Hans Bock. With a van der Waals volume of ≈7 Å^{3} it surpasses the related TIPS group (≈2 Å^{3}).

One potential application is to promote asymmetric induction, as in this diastereoselective sequence of Mukaiyama aldol additions:

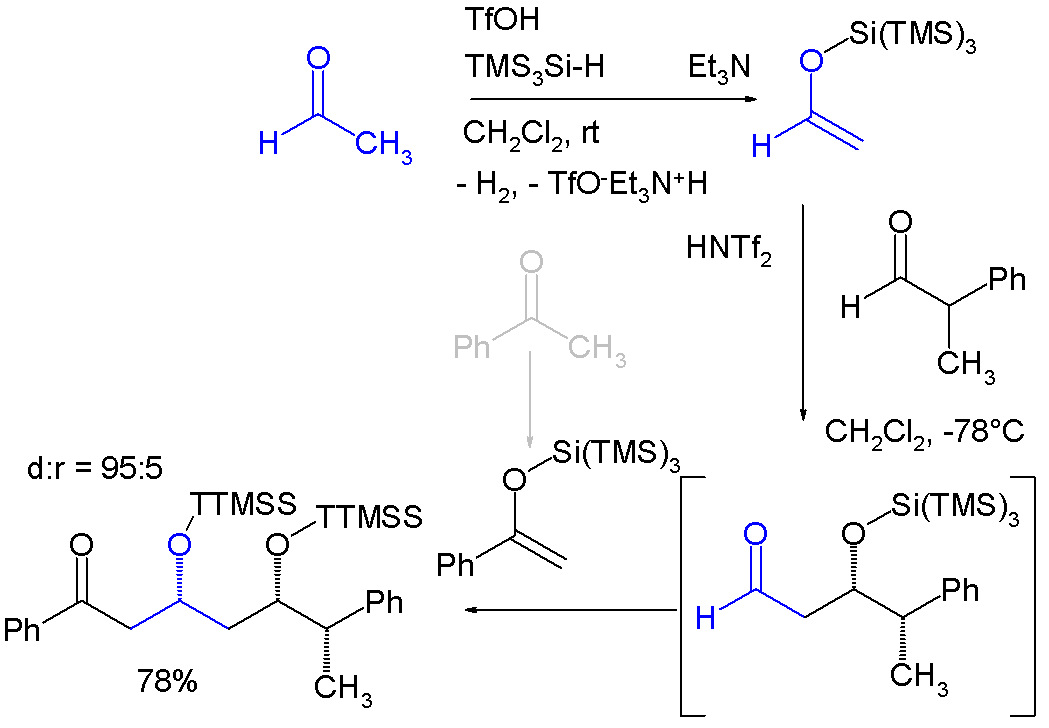

In organometallic chemistry, many coordination complexes have been prepared with (Me_{3}Si)_{3}Si^{−} (hypersilyl) ligand. Chalcogenide derivatives of (Me_{3}Si)_{3}SiLi are also well developed:

3 Me_{3}SiLi + E → (Me_{3}Si)_{3}SiELi (E = S, Se, Te)

Tris(trimethylsilyl)silane, TTMSS−H, is of interest in its own right for (inter alia) radical hydrogen atom transfer.
