= Europium(III) carbonate =

Identifiers
CAS Number	5895-48-7 anhydrous; 13265-19-5 trihydrate; 86546-99-8 hydrate
3D model (JSmol)	Interactive image
ChemSpider	144969
EC Number	227-582-0
PubChem CID	165371
CompTox Dashboard (EPA)	DTXSID40890604
- InChI: InChI=1S/3CH2O3.2Eu/c3*2-1(3)4;;/h3*(H2,2,3,4);;/q;;;2*+3/p-6 Key: MBFNJTXDYDGXDL-UHFFFAOYSA-H
- SMILES: C(=O)([O-])[O-].C(=O)([O-])[O-].C(=O)([O-])[O-].[Eu+3].[Eu+3]

Properties
Chemical formula	Eu_{2}(CO_{3})_{3}
Molar mass	483.961 g/mol
Appearance	Solid
Melting point	Decomposes
Solubility in water	Insoluble （1.94×10^{−6}mol/L，30℃）

Related compounds
Other cations	Samarium(III) carbonate Gadolinium(III) carbonate
- Except where otherwise noted, data are given for materials in their standard state (at 25 °C [77 °F], 100 kPa). Infobox references

Europium(III) carbonate is an inorganic compound with the chemical formula Eu_{2}(CO_{3})_{3}.

== Preparation ==
Europium(III) carbonate can be obtained by mixing and heating an aqueous solution of ammonium carbonate and europium(III) chloride. A saturated carbon dioxide ammonium carbonate solution (obtained from the reaction of hydrochloric acid and ammonium carbonate solution) can also precipitate europium carbonate from a europium salt solution. Other preparation methods include the thermal decomposition of europium(III) acetate and the reaction of a suspension of europium(III) oxide in water and supercritical carbon dioxide.

== Chemical properties ==
Europium(III) carbonate is soluble in acid and releases carbon dioxide:

Eu_{2}(CO_{3})_{3} + 6 H^{+} → 2 Eu^{+}_{3} + 3 H_{2}O + 3 CO_{2}↑

Europium(III) carbonate decomposes at high temperatures to form europium(III) oxide:

Eu_{2}(CO_{3})_{3} → Eu_{2}O_{3} + 3 CO_{2}↑
