= Dimethiconol =

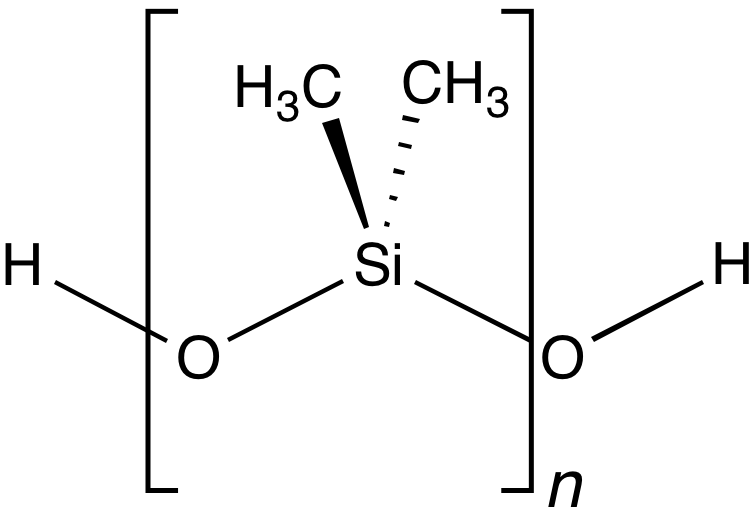

Names
- Other names Poly[oxy(dimethylsilylene)], α-hydro-ω-hydroxy-, dimethiconal

Identifiers
CAS Number	31692-79-2
ChemSpider	63863
UNII	343C7U75XW

Properties
Chemical formula	HO(Si(CH_{3})_{2}O)_{n}H
Density	1.0±0.1 g/cm^{3}
Boiling point	167.4±23.0 °C
- Except where otherwise noted, data are given for materials in their standard state (at 25 °C [77 °F], 100 kPa). Infobox references

Dimethoconols are a class of silicone-based polymers similar to dimethicone in their chemical structure save that molecules of dimethiconol end with hydroxyl (-OH) groups. They are used in a wide range of cosmetic and personal care products such as suntan lotion and lipstick where it works as an emollient, a film-former, an antistatic agent and an anti-foaming agent, among other uses. Like other silicone-based liquids, it is not water soluble.
