= Trimethylsilanol =

- Structural formula of trimethylsilanol

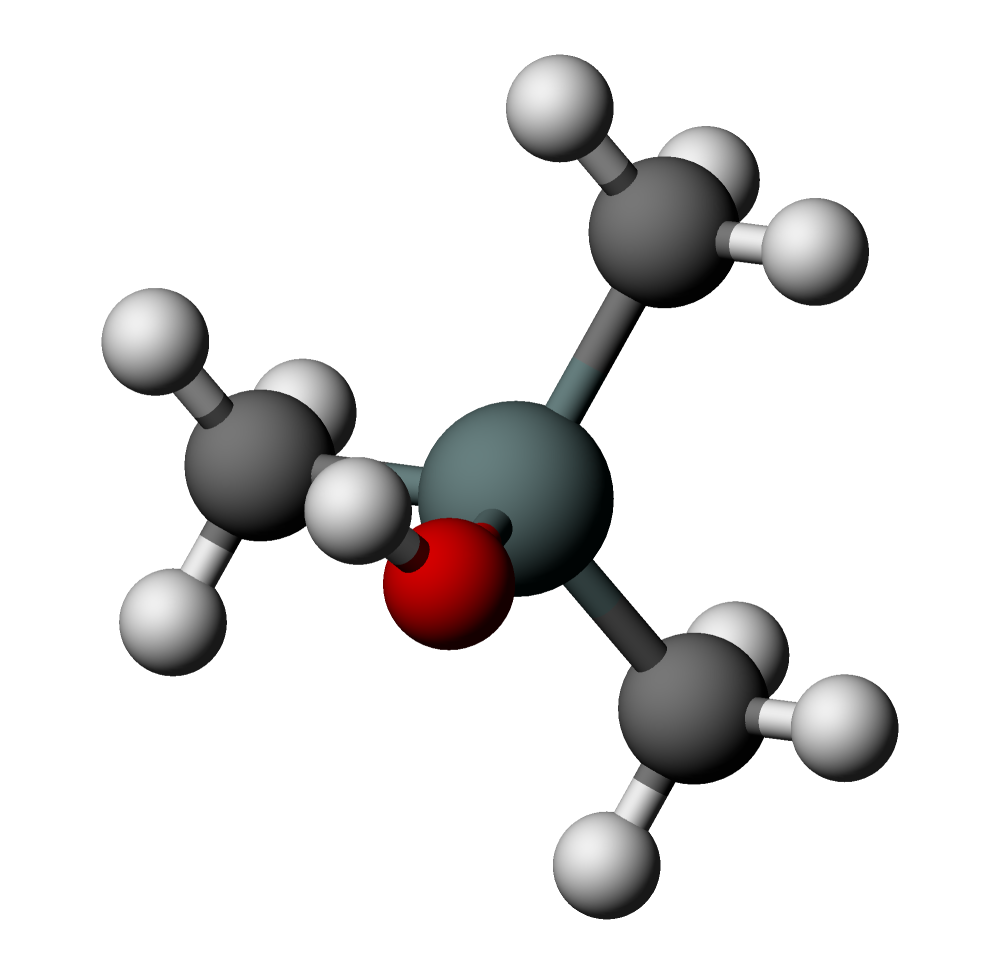
- Ball and stick model of trimethylsilanol

Names
- Preferred IUPAC name Trimethylsilanol
- Other names Hydroxy(trimethyl)silane

Identifiers
CAS Number	1066-40-6
3D model (JSmol)	Interactive image
ChemSpider	59498
ECHA InfoCard	100.012.650
EC Number	213-914-1
MeSH	Trimethylsilanol
PubChem CID	66110
UNII	Z4BIN3300P
CompTox Dashboard (EPA)	DTXSID7061433
- InChI: InChI=1S/C3H10OSi/c1-5(2,3)4/h4H,1-3H3 Key: AAPLIUHOKVUFCC-UHFFFAOYSA-N
- SMILES: O[Si](C)(C)C

Properties
Chemical formula	(CH_{3})_{3}SiOH
Molar mass	90.197 g·mol^{−1}
Appearance	Colourless liquid
Boiling point	99 °C (210 °F; 372 K)
Vapor pressure	21 mbar (20 °C)

Related compounds
Related compounds	tert-Butanol; Dimethylsilanediol; Silanol
- Except where otherwise noted, data are given for materials in their standard state (at 25 °C [77 °F], 100 kPa). Infobox references

Trimethylsilanol (TMS) is an organosilicon compound with the formula (CH_{3})_{3}SiOH. The Si centre bears three methyl groups and one hydroxyl group. It is a colourless volatile liquid.

== Occurrence ==
TMS is a contaminant in the atmospheres of spacecraft, where it arises from the degradation of silicone-based materials. Specifically, it is the volatile product from the hydrolysis of polydimethylsiloxane, which are generally terminated with trimethylsilyl groups:

(CH_{3})_{3}SiO[Si(CH_{3})_{2}O]_{n}R + H_{2}O → (CH_{3})_{3}SiOH + HO[Si(CH_{3})_{2}O]_{n}R

TMS and related volatile siloxanes are formed by hydrolysis of silicones-based containing materials, which are found in detergents and cosmetic products.

Traces of trimethylsilanol, together with other volatile siloxanes, are present in biogas and landfill gas, again resulting from the degradation of silicones. As their combustion forms particles of silicates and microcrystalline quartz, which cause abrasion of combustion engine parts, they pose problems for the use of such gases in combustion engines.

== Production ==
Trimethylsilanol cannot be produced by simple hydrolysis of chlorotrimethylsilane as this reaction leads to the etherification product hexamethyldisiloxane, because of the by-product hydrochloric acid.

$$\ce{2ClSi(CH_3)_3 ->[{\mathrm{+H_2O,\;-HCl}}]} \ce{2HOSi(CH_3)_3 ->[\mathrm{{-H_2O}}] (CH_3)_3Si-O-Si(CH_3)_3}$$

Trimethylsilanol is accessible by weakly basic hydrolysis of chlorotrimethylsilane, since the dimerization can thus be avoided. Trimethylsilanol can also be obtained by the basic hydrolysis of hexamethyldisiloxane.

== Reactions ==
Trimethylsilanol is a weak acid with a pK_{a} value of 11. The acidity is comparable to that of orthosilicic acid, but much higher than the one of alcohols like tert-butanol (pK_{a} 19). Deprotonation with sodium hydroxide gives sodium trimethylsiloxide.

TMS reacts with the silanols (R_{3}SiOH) giving silyl ethers.

== Structure ==
In terms of its structure, the molecule is tetrahedral. The compound forms monoclinic crystals.

== Additional properties ==
The heat of evaporation is 45.64 kJ·mol^{−1}, the evaporation entropy 123 J·K^{−1}·mol^{−1}. The vapor pressure function according to Antoine is obtained as log_{10}(P/1 bar) = A − B/(T + C) (P in bar, T in K) with A = 5.44591, B = 1767.766 K and C = −44.888 K in a temperature range from 291 K to 358 K. Below the melting point at −4.5 °C, The ^{1}H NMR in CDCl_{3} shows a singlet at δ = 0.14 ppm.

== Bioactivity ==
Like other silanols, trimethylsilanol exhibits antimicrobial properties.
