= Endcapping =

In chromatography, endcapping refers to the replacement of accessible silanol groups in a bonded stationary phase by trimethylsilyl groups. End-capped columns have much lower residual silanol group activity compared to non-endcapped columns. Endcapped columns show decreased retention for hydrogen bond acceptors, such as ionized bases, and increased retention for protonated bases.
