= Trimethylsilyl group =

Functional group

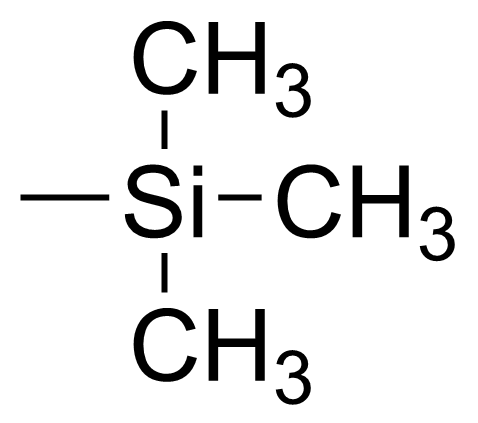

The trimethylsilyl group (–Si(CH_{3})_{3}, abbreviated TMS) is a functional group in organic chemistry. This group consists of three methyl groups bonded to a silicon atom, which is in turn bonded to the rest of a molecule. This structural group is characterized by chemical inertness and a large molecular volume. It is thus an example of a silyl protecting group.

Compounds with trimethylsilyl groups are not normally found in nature, but have applications in chemical synthesis and analysis.

== Applications ==
Trimethylsilyl groups typically appear as temporary protecting groups on a reactant molecule during chemical synthesis or some other chemical reactions. Trimethylsilylating agents include trimethylsilyl chloride and bis(trimethylsilyl)acetamide.

Like other silyl protecting groups, the trimethylsilyl group acts as an ersatz proton. It is much more bulky than a proton, however. The resulting steric effects can enable isolation of otherwise-reactive molecules, as observed in tetrahedranes.

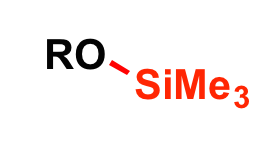
Trimethylsilyl bonded through displacing the proton from a hydroxyl group

Trimethylsilyl forms strong bonds to hydroxyl groups in alcohols, phenols, or carboxylic acids. The resulting trimethylsiloxy groups [−O-Si(CH_{3})_{3}] shield such functional groups from pH variation, and participate in neither hydrogen bonding nor prototropic equilibria.

The reduced intermolecular forces between trimethylsilyloxy moeities make their parent compound more volatile. Trimethylsilated compounds are thus more amenable to gas-chromatographic or mass-spectrometric analysis. An example of trimethylsilylation for volatilization is mentioned in the Brassicasterol article. Such derivatizations are often done on a small scale in special vials.

In chromatography, endcapping is the process of covering a bonded stationary phase's accessible silanol groups with trimethylsilyl groups. The resulting columns are much less acidic and nonpolar.

In an NMR spectrum, signals from atoms in trimethylsilyl groups in compounds will commonly have chemical shifts close to the tetramethylsilane reference peak at 0 ppm. Also compounds, such as high temperature silicone "stopcock" grease, which have polysiloxanes (often called silicones) in them will commonly show peaks from their methyl groups (attached to the silicon atoms) having NMR chemical shifts close to the tetramethylsilane standard peak, such as at 0.07 ppm in CDCl_{3}.

=== Alcohol protection ===
In organic synthesis, TMS group is used as a protecting group for alcohols.

==== Protection ====
Common methods include:

- Trimethylsilyl chloride (TMSCl) or trimethylsilyl trifluoromethanesulfonate (TMSOTf) and base (i.e. pyridine, triethylamine, or 2,6-lutidine) in dichloromethane

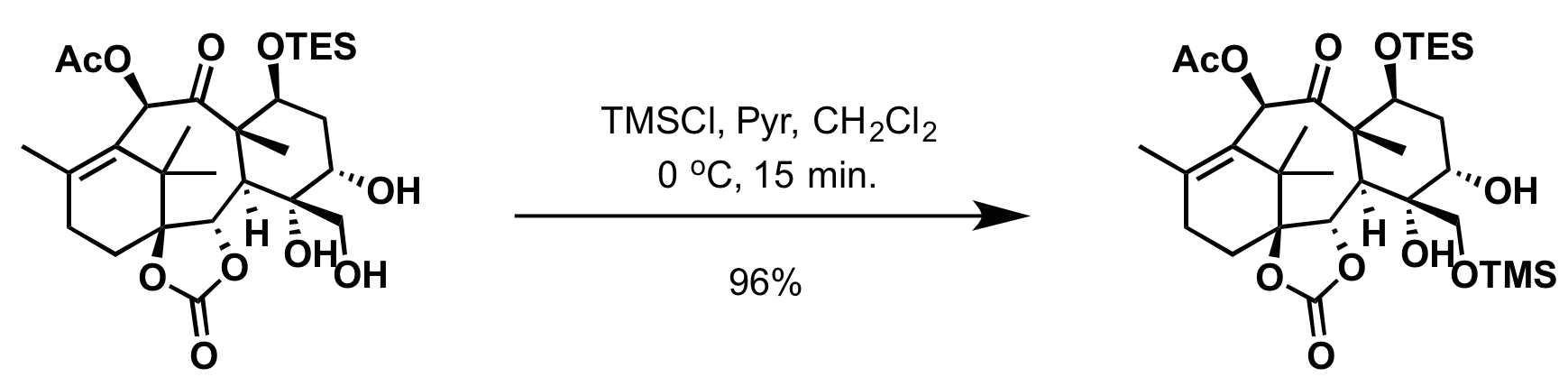
Selectively protecting an alcohol with trimethylsilyl chloride

- TMSCl and lithium sulfide (Li_{2}S) in acetonitrile

==== Deprotection ====
Common methods include:

- TMS groups are susceptible to cleavage upon treatment with HF-based reagents
  - Tetrabutylammonium fluoride (Bu_{4}NF) in THF
  - Fluorosilicic acid (H_{2}SiF_{6})
- Treatment with HCl in THF/water solution

== See also ==
- Trimethylsilanol
- Trimethylsilylacetylene
- Trimethylsilyl chloride and fluoride
- Tetramethylsilane
