= Sodium trimethylsiloxide =

Names
- Other names Sodium trimethylsilanoate, Sodium trimethylsilanolate

Identifiers
3D model (JSmol)	Interactive image
ChemSpider	78851
ECHA InfoCard	100.038.112
EC Number	241-939-8
PubChem CID	23672319
CompTox Dashboard (EPA)	DTXSID7066302
- InChI: InChI=1S/C3H9OSi.Na/c1-5(2,3)4;/h1-3H3;/q-1;+1 Key: HSNUIYJWTSJUMS-UHFFFAOYSA-N
- SMILES: C[Si](C)(C)[O-].[Na+]

Properties
Chemical formula	C_{3}H_{9}NaOSi
Molar mass	112.179 g·mol^{−1}
Appearance	white solid
Density	1.255 g/cm^{3}
Melting point	147–150 °C (297–302 °F; 420–423 K)
- Except where otherwise noted, data are given for materials in their standard state (at 25 °C [77 °F], 100 kPa). Infobox references

Sodium trimethylsiloxide is an organosilicon compound with the formula NaOSi(CH_{3})_{3}. It is the sodium salt of the conjugate base derived from trimethylsilanol. A white solid, its molecular structure consists of a cluster with Na-O-Na linkages on the basis of closely related compounds.

The salt is used to prepare trimethylsiloxide complexes by salt metathesis. Trimethylsiloxide is a lipophilic pseudohalide.

It is a source of oxide dianion.

== Related compounds ==
- Sodium silox, NaOSi(tBu)_{3} (tBu = C(CH_{3})_{3})
- Potassium trimethylsilanolate
