= Silanol =

Si−OH functional group in silicon chemistry

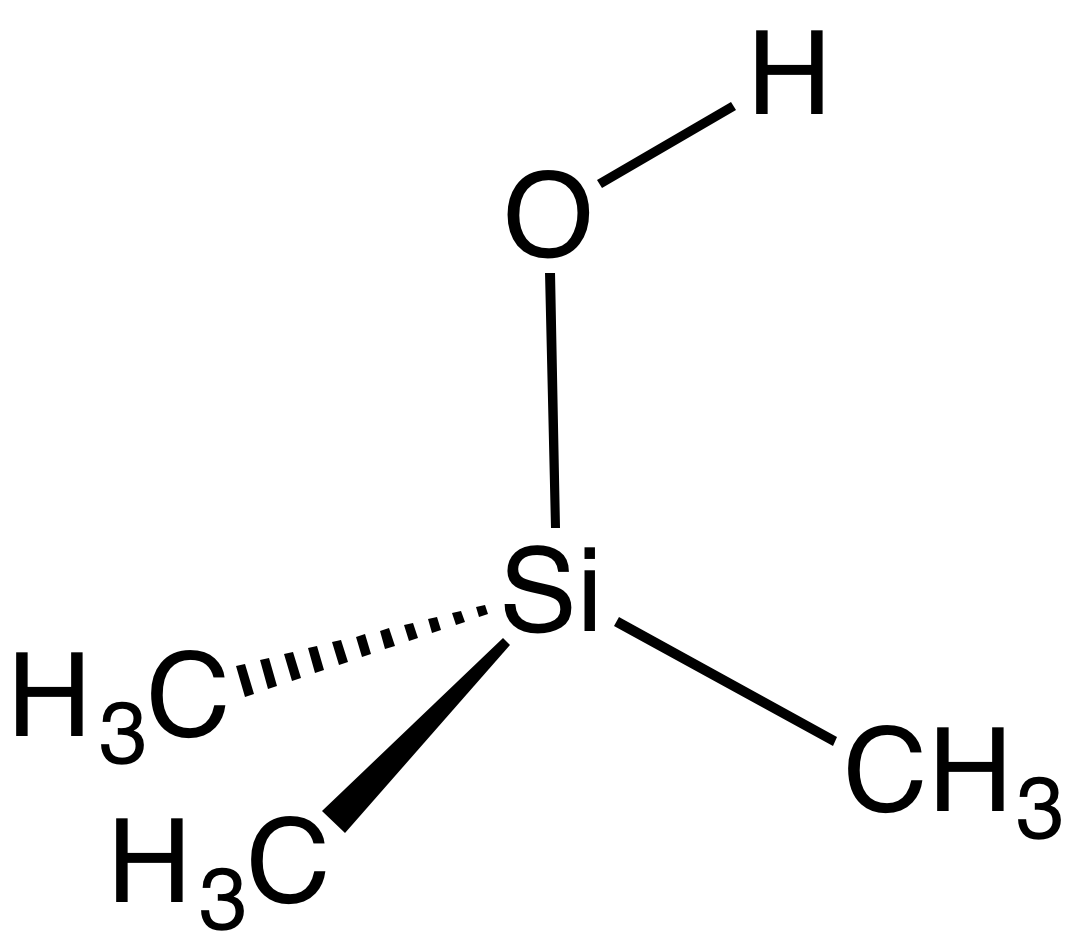
Structure of trimethylsilanol

A silanol is a functional group in silicon chemistry with the connectivity Si−O−H. It is related to the hydroxy functional group (C−O−H) found in all alcohols. Silanols are often invoked as intermediates in organosilicon chemistry and silicate mineralogy. If a silanol contains one or more organic residues, it is an organosilanol.

== Preparation ==
=== From alkoxysilanes ===
The first isolated example of a silanol was Et_{3}SiOH, reported in 1871 by Albert Ladenburg. He prepared the “silicol” by hydrolysis of Et_{3}SiOEt (Et = CH_{2}CH_{3}).

=== From silyl halides and related compounds ===
Silanols are generally synthesized by hydrolysis of halosilanes, alkoxysilanes, or aminosilanes. Chlorosilanes are the most common reactants:

R_{3}Si–Cl + H_{2}O → R_{3}Si–OH + HCl

The hydrolysis of fluorosilanes requires more forcing reagents, i.e. alkali. The alkoxysilanes (silyl ethers) of the type R_{3}Si(OR') are slow to hydrolyze. Compared to the silyl ethers, silyl acetates are faster to hydrolyze, with the advantage that the released acetic acid is less aggressive. For this reason silyl acetates are sometimes recommended for applications.

=== By oxidation of silyl hydrides ===
An alternative route involves oxidation of hydrosilanes. A wide range of oxidants have been employed, including air, peracids, dioxiranes, and potassium permanganate (for hindered silanes). In the presence of metal catalysts, silanes undergo hydrolysis:

R_{3}Si−H + H_{2}O → R_{3}Si−OH + H_{2}

== Structure and examples ==
The Si–O bond distance is typically about 1.65 Å. In the solid state, silanols engage in hydrogen bonding.

Most silanols have only one OH group, e.g. trimethylsilanol. Also known are some silanediols, e.g., diphenylsilanediol. For sterically bulky substituents, even silanetriols have been prepared.

== Reactions ==
=== Acidity ===
Silanols are more acidic than the corresponding alcohols. This trend contrasts with the fact that Si is far less electronegative than carbon (1.90 vs 2.55, respectively). For Et_{3}SiOH, the pK_{a} is estimated at 13.6 vs. 19 for tert-butyl alcohol. The pK_{a} of (3-ClC_{6}H_{4})Si(CH_{3})_{2}OH is 11. Because of their greater acidity, silanols can be fully deprotonated in aqueous solution, especially the arylsilanols. The conjugate base is called a siloxide or a silanolate.

Despite the disparity in acidity, the basicities of alkoxides and siloxides are similar.

=== Condensation and the sol–gel process ===
Silanols condense to give disiloxanes:

2 R_{3}SiOH → R_{3}Si−O−SiR_{3} + H_{2}O

The conversions of silyl halides, acetates, and ethers to siloxanes proceed via silanols. The sol–gel process, which entails the conversion of, for example, Si(OEt)_{4} into hydrated SiO_{2}, proceeds via silanol intermediates.

== Occurrence ==
Silanols exist not only as chemical compounds, but are pervasive on the surface of silica and related silicates. Their presence is responsible for the absorption properties of silica gel. In chromatography, derivatization of accessible silanol groups in a bonded stationary phase with trimethylsilyl groups is referred to as endcapping. Organosilanols occur as intermediates in industrial processes such as the manufacturing of silicones. Moreover, organosilanols occur as metabolites in the biodegradation of small ring silicones in mammals.

Trisilanol intermediate in the formation of a cubic silsesquioxane

== Biorelevance ==
Some silanediols and silanetriols inhibit hydrolytic enzymes such as thermolysin and acetylcholinesterase.

== Parent silanols ==
Literally, silanol refers to a single compound with the formula H_{3}SiOH (Chemical Abstracts number 14475-38-8). The family SiH_{4−n}(OH)_{n} (n = 1, 2, 3, 4) are highly unstable and are mainly of interest to theoretical chemists. The perhydroxylated silanol, sometimes called orthosilicic acid, is often discussed in vague terms, but has not been well characterized.
