= Diphenylsilanediol =

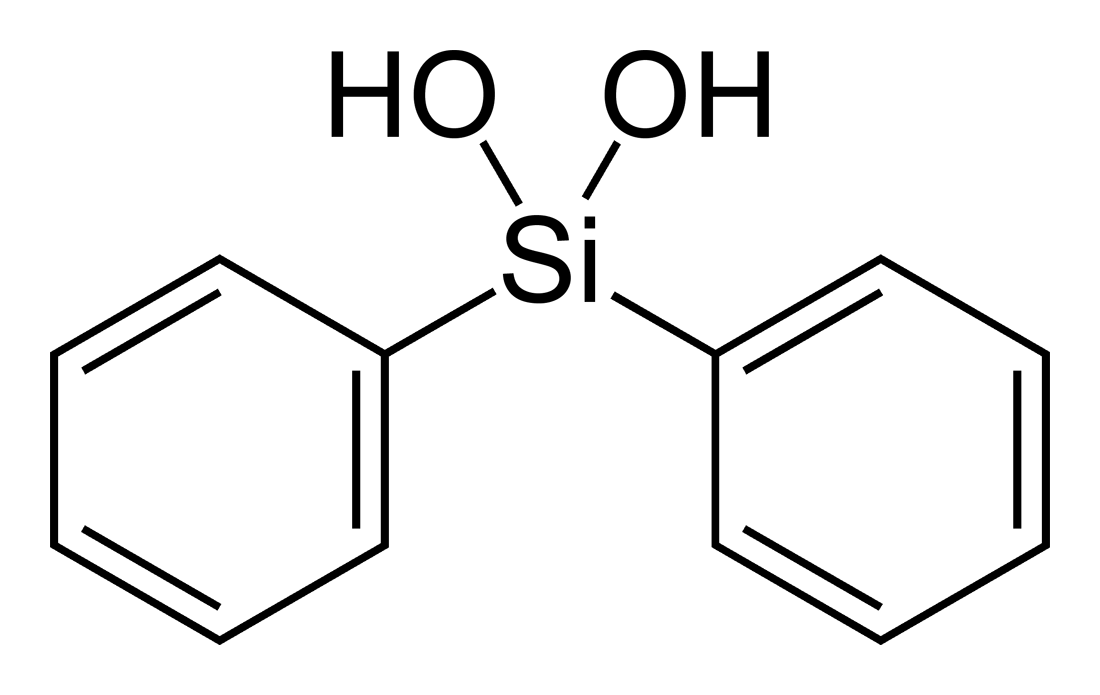

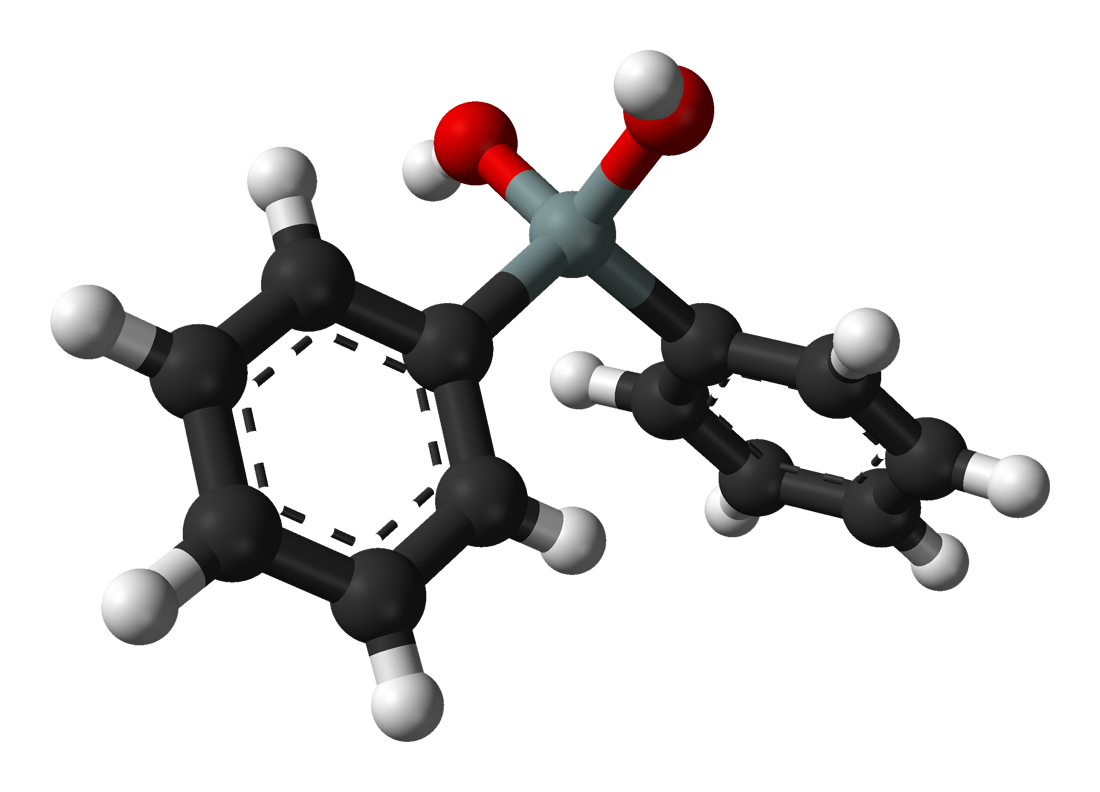

Names
- Preferred IUPAC name Diphenylsilanediol
- Other names dihydroxydiphenylsilane

Identifiers
CAS Number	947-42-2
3D model (JSmol)	Interactive image
ChemSpider	13100
ECHA InfoCard	100.012.207
PubChem CID	13693
UNII	36X37P8NBB
CompTox Dashboard (EPA)	DTXSID3061340
- InChI: InChI=1S/C12H12O2Si/c13-15(14,11-7-3-1-4-8-11)12-9-5-2-6-10-12/h1-10,13-14H Key: OLLFKUHHDPMQFR-UHFFFAOYSA-N
- SMILES: c1ccc(cc1)[Si](c2ccccc2)(O)O

Properties
Chemical formula	C_{12}H_{12}O_{2}Si
Molar mass	216.308 g/mol
Appearance	Colorless crystals
Odor	Odorless
Density	1.255 g/cm^{3}
Melting point	144 to 148 °C (291 to 298 °F; 417 to 421 K)

Structure
Crystal structure	Monoclinic
- Except where otherwise noted, data are given for materials in their standard state (at 25 °C [77 °F], 100 kPa). verify (what is ?) Infobox references

Diphenylsilanediol, Ph_{2}Si(OH)_{2}, is a silanol. The tetrahedral molecule forms hydrogen-bonded columns in the solid state. It can be prepared by hydrolysis of diphenyldichlorosilane Ph_{2}SiCl_{2}. Diphenylsilanediol can act as an anticonvulsant, in a similar way to phenytoin. Although the compound is stable in normal conditions, the presence of basic impurities can accelerate the condensation of the silanol groups.
