= Sodium silox =

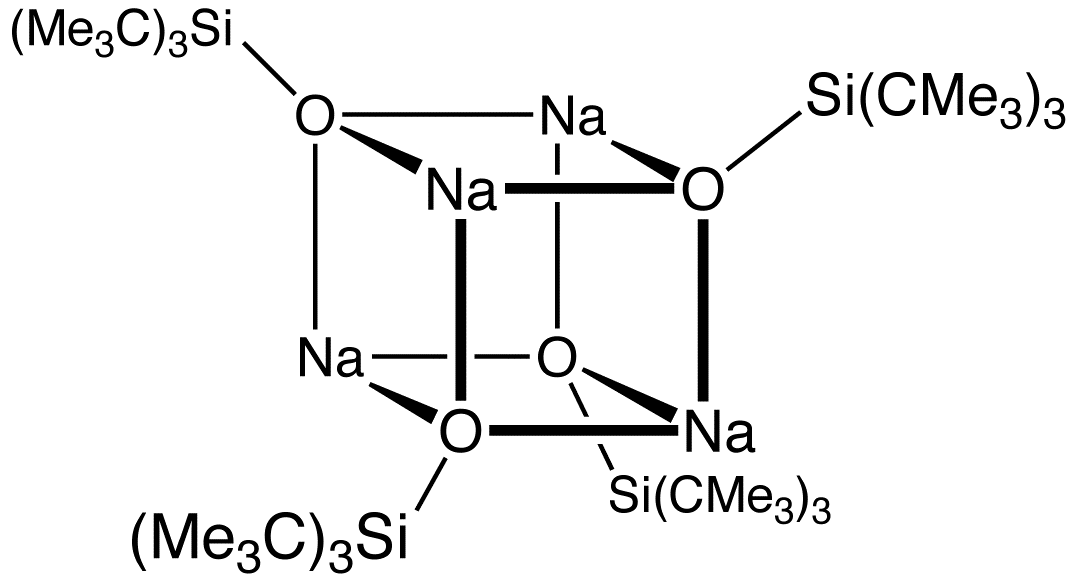
- Stereo structural formula of tetrameric sodium silox

Names
- IUPAC name Sodium silox
- Systematic IUPAC name Sodium tri-tert-butylsilanolate

Identifiers
CAS Number	461703-02-6
3D model (JSmol)	Interactive image
ChemSpider	35766904
PubChem CID	23701721
CompTox Dashboard (EPA)	DTXSID90635729
- InChI: InChI=1S/C12H27OSi.Na/c1-10(2,3)14(13,11(4,5)6)12(7,8)9;/h1-9H3;/q-1;+1 Key: QAGFKHQOLBYGIF-UHFFFAOYSA-N
- SMILES: [Na+].CC(C)(C)[Si]([O-])(C(C)(C)C)C(C)(C)C

Properties
Chemical formula	C_{12}H_{27}NaOSi
Molar mass	238.422 g·mol^{−1}
Appearance	colourless solid
- Except where otherwise noted, data are given for materials in their standard state (at 25 °C [77 °F], 100 kPa). Infobox references

Sodium silox is the name for an organosilicon compound that serves as a source of the siloxide anion [(CH_{3})_{3}C]_{3}SiO^{−}. Complexes of this bulky anionic ligand often adopt with low coordination numbers. Examples include Ti(silox)_{3}, Nb(silox)_{3}(PMe_{3}), and [Cr(silox)_{3}]^{−}.

== Properties of silox and related complexes ==
The sodium derivative, which has salt-like properties, is a cubane-type cluster.

Related bulky anionic ligands include C_{5}Me_{5}^{−}, (Me_{3}Si)_{2}N^{−}, and NacNac^{−}. Silox has a larger cone angle than C_{5}Me_{5}^{−} and is a poorer donor. It is also larger than silylamides. For these reasons, silox anion forms highly unsaturated complexes.

Complexes with high coordinative unsaturation display high reactivity so long as they do not undergo intramolecular reactions. Silox offers this possibility. Examples of high reactivity exhibited by metal-silox compounds include the C-O bond in carbon monoxide and the C-N bond in pyridine.

== Preparation ==
Na(silox) is usually prepared by deprotonation of the silanol (t-Bu)_{3}SiOH, which is prepared by a multistep route via the intermediacy of (t-Bu)_{2}SiF_{2}. It is also obtained by treatment of ^{t}Bu_{3}SiNa with nitrous oxide.

== Related compounds ==
- Sodium trimethylsiloxide
