= Europium(III) acetate =

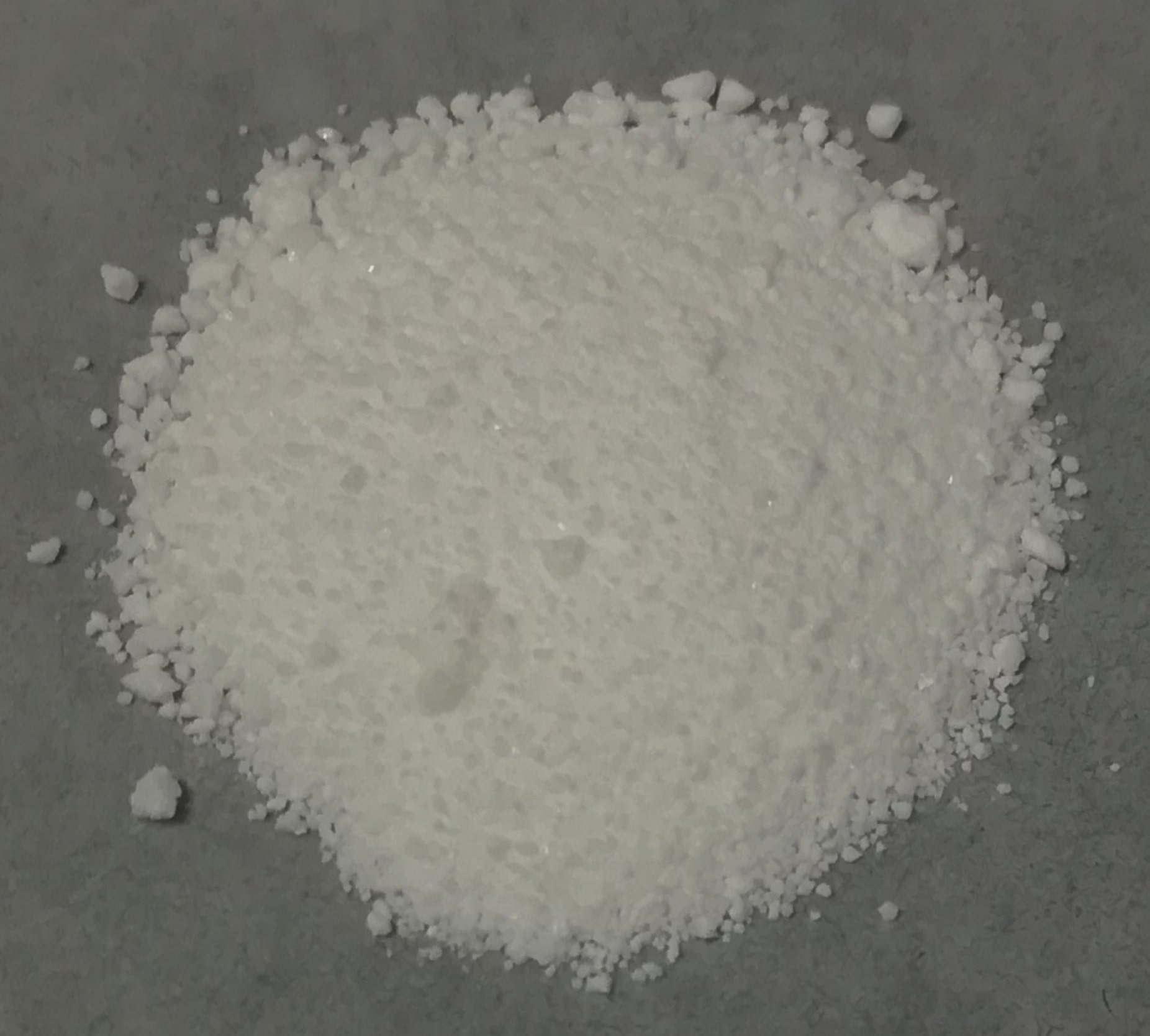

Names
- Other names Europium acetate

Identifiers
CAS Number	1184-63-0
3D model (JSmol)	Interactive image
ChemSpider	144466
ECHA InfoCard	100.013.337
EC Number	214-670-9
PubChem CID	164792
CompTox Dashboard (EPA)	DTXSID70890536
- InChI: InChI=1S/3C2H4O2.Eu/c3*1-2(3)4;/h3*1H3,(H,3,4);/q;;;+3/p-3 Key: LNYNHRRKSYMFHF-UHFFFAOYSA-K
- SMILES: CC(=O)[O-].CC(=O)[O-].CC(=O)[O-].[Eu+3]

Properties
Chemical formula	Eu(CH_{3}COO)_{3}
Molar mass	329,092 g/mol (anhydrous) 341,059 g/mol (monohydrate)
Appearance	white solid
Solubility in water	soluble in water

Related compounds
Other anions	Europium(III) oxide Europium(III) hydroxide Europium(III) carbonate
Other cations	Samarium(III) acetate Gadolinium(III) acetate
Related compounds	Europium(II) acetate
- Except where otherwise noted, data are given for materials in their standard state (at 25 °C [77 °F], 100 kPa). Infobox references

Europium(III) acetate is an inorganic salt of europium and acetic acid with the chemical formula of Eu(CH_{3}COO)_{3}. In this compound, europium exhibits the +3 oxidation state. It can exist in the anhydrous form, sesquihydrate (Note: Note: The sesquihydrate of europium(III) acetate has the structure [Eu_{2}(CH_{3}COO)_{6}(H_{2}O)](H_{2}O)_{2}.) and tetrahydrate. Its hydrate molecule is a dimer.

== Preparation ==
Europium acetate can be obtained by stirring reaction of acetic acid and europium oxide under heating, and then diluting with water and crystallizing:

Eu_{2}O_{3} + 6 CH_{3}COOH → 2 Eu(CH_{3}COO)_{3} + 3 H_{2}O

Europium can also directly participate in the reaction:

2 Eu + 6 CH_{3}COOH → 2 Eu(CH_{3}COO)_{3} + 3 H_{2}↑

== Properties ==
=== Physical properties ===
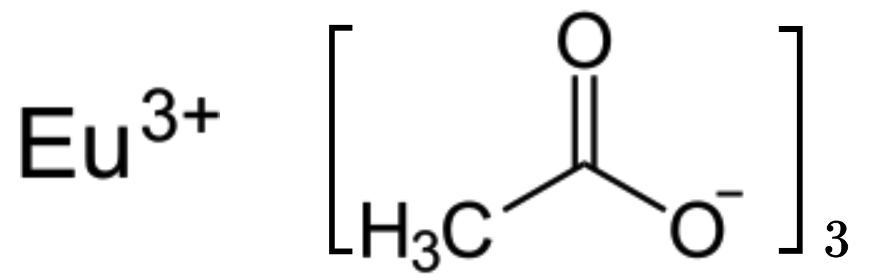
Structure of europium acetate

The anhydrous europium acetate crystallizes monoclinically in the space group C2/c (space group no. 15) with the lattice parameters a = 1126.0(3), b = 2900.5(6), c = 799.1( 2) pm and β = 132.03(2)° with four formula units per unit cell. The sesquihydrate crystallizes monoclinically in the space group Cc (No. 9) with the lattice parameters a = 1608.7(2), b = 1665.6(2), c = 839.1(1) pm and β = 115.75( 9)° with four formula units per unit cell. The heat capacity at 280 K is 803±16 J/(mol∙K).

=== Chemical properties ===
Europium acetate can be dissolved in water, acidified with acetic acid, and the compound of divalent europium [Eu(CH_{3}COO)_{2}(CH_{3}COOH)(H_{2}O)_{2}] can be obtained by electrochemical reduction.

Europium acetate can be crystallized in excess glacial acetic acid to give the salt [Eu(H(CH_{3}COO)_{2})_{3}](H_{2}O).

==== Decomposition ====
Europium acetate can be decomposed by heating, and the hydrate first loses water to obtain anhydrous, and then passes through basic acetate EuOCH_{3}COO, basic carbonate Eu_{2}O_{2}CO_{3}, and finally obtains europium oxide. The tetrahydrate of europium acetate decomposes in air over 6 stages to europium oxide.

Stage 1 at 135 °C:

Eu(CH_{3}COO)_{3}·4H_{2}O → Eu(CH_{3}COO)_{3}·H_{2}O + 3H_{2}O

Stage 2 at 170 °C:

Eu(CH_{3}COO)_{3}·3H_{2}O → Eu(CH_{3}COO)_{3}·0.5 H_{2}O + 0.5 H_{2}O

Stage 3 at 210 °C:

Eu(CH_{3}COO)_{3}·0.5H_{2}O → Eu(CH_{3}COO)_{3} + 0.5 H_{2}O

Stage 4 at 310 °C:

Eu(CH_{3}COO)_{3} → EuO(CH_{3}COO) + C_{3}H_{6}O + CO_{2}

Stage 5 at 390 °C:

2EuO(CH_{3}COO) → Eu_{2}O_{2}[CO_{3}] + C_{3}H_{6}O

Stage 6 at 670 °C:

Eu_{2}O_{2}[CO_{3}] → Eu_{2}O_{3} + CO_{2}
