= Cyclosiloxane =

Class of chemical compounds

Cyclosiloxanes are a class of silicone material. They are volatile and often used as a solvent. The four main commercial varieties are hexamethylcyclotrisiloxane (D3), octamethylcyclotetrasiloxane (D4), decamethylcyclopentasiloxane (D5) and dodecamethylcyclohexasiloxane (D6). They evaporate and degrade in air under sunlight.

== Hexamethylcyclotrisiloxane (D3) ==
Chemical structure of hexamethylcyclotrisiloxane

The hexamethylcyclotrisiloxane silicone liquid consists of three repeating units of silicon (Si) and oxygen (O) atoms in a closed loop giving it a circular structure. Each silicon atom has two methyl groups attached (CH_{3}).

== Octamethylcyclotetrasiloxane (D4) ==
Chemical structure of octamethylcyclotetrasiloxane

The octamethylcyclotetrasiloxane silicone liquid has no odor and consists of four repeating units of silicon (Si) and oxygen (O) atoms in a closed loop giving it a circular structure. Each silicon atom has two methyl groups attached (CH_{3}).

== Decamethylcyclopentasiloxane (D5) ==
Chemical structure of decamethylcyclopentasiloxane

The decamethylcyclopentasiloxane silicone liquid has no odor and consists of five repeating units of silicon (Si) and oxygen (O) atoms in a closed loop giving it a circular structure. Each silicon atom has two methyl groups attached (CH_{3}). Typically it is used as an ingredient in antiperspirant, skin cream, sun protection lotion and make-up. With a low surface tension of 18 mN/m this material has good spreading properties.

== Dodecamethylcyclohexasiloxane (D6) ==
The dodecamethylcyclohexasiloxane silicone liquid has no odor and consists of six repeating units of silicon (Si) and oxygen (O) atoms in a closed loop giving it a circular structure. Each silicon atom has two methyl groups attached (CH_{3}). CASRN: 540-97-6. D6 is also contained under the CAS No. (69430-24-6 ) which is associated with the names cyclopolydimethylsiloxane, cyclopolydimethylsiloxane (DX), cyclosiloxanes di-Me, dimethylcyclopolysiloxane, polydimethyl siloxy cyclics, polydimethylcyclosiloxane, cyclomethicone and mixed cyclosiloxane.

== See also ==
- Polydimethylsiloxane
- Cyclomethicone
- Siloxane and other organosilicon compounds

== Literature ==
- Cyclosiloxanes (pdf-file), Materials for the December 4-5, 2008 Meeting of the California Environmental Contaminant Biomonitoring Program (CECBP) Scientific Guidance Panel (SGP)
