= Tris(trimethylsilyl)methane =

Names
- Preferred IUPAC name Methanetriyltris(trimethylsilane)

Identifiers
CAS Number	1068-69-5
3D model (JSmol)	Interactive image
ChemSpider	532318
ECHA InfoCard	100.154.179
PubChem CID	612377
CompTox Dashboard (EPA)	DTXSID50346465
- InChI: InChI=1S/C10H28Si3/c1-11(2,3)10(12(4,5)6)13(7,8)9/h10H,1-9H3 Key: BNZSPXKCIAAEJK-UHFFFAOYSA-N
- SMILES: C[Si](C)(C)C([Si](C)(C)C)[Si](C)(C)C

Properties
Chemical formula	C_{10}H_{28}Si_{3}
Molar mass	232.589 g·mol^{−1}
Appearance	colorless liquid
Density	0.827 g/cm^{3}
Boiling point	219 °C (426 °F; 492 K)

Hazards
- GHS labelling
Pictograms	(GHS07: Exclamation mark)
Signal word	Warning
Hazard statements	H315, H319, H335
Precautionary statements	P261, P264, P271, P280, P302+P352, P304+P340, P305+P351+P338, P312, P321, P332+P313, P337+P313, P362, P403+P233, P405, P501
- Except where otherwise noted, data are given for materials in their standard state (at 25 °C [77 °F], 100 kPa). Infobox references

Tris(trimethylsilyl)methane is the organosilicon compound with the formula (tms)_{3}CH (where tms = (CH_{3})_{3}Si). It is a colorless liquid that is highly soluble in hydrocarbon solvents.

== Trisyl chemistry ==
Structure of [InC(tms)_{3}]_{4}, an In(I) tetrahedrane (dark gray = In, orange = Si).

Reaction of tris(trimethylsilyl)methane with methyl lithium gives tris(trimethylsilyl)methyllithium, called trisyllithium:

(tms)_{3}CH + CH_{3}Li → (tms)_{3}CLi + CH_{4}

Trisyllithium is useful in Petersen olefination reactions:

(tms)_{3}CLi + R_{2}CO → (tms)_{2}C=CR_{2} + tmsOLi

Trisyllithium is also a source of the bulky trisyl ligand. Some tris(trimethylsilyl)methyl derivatives are far more stable than less substituted derivatives. For example, (Me_{3}Si)_{3}CTeH is a well-behaved tellurol. [(Me_{3}Si)_{3}CTl]_{4} is a rare example of a robust organothallium(I) compound.

== See also ==
- Tris(trimethylsilyl)silane
