= Tetrakis(trimethylsilyl)silane =

Names
- Preferred IUPAC name 1,1,1,3,3,3-Hexamethyl-2,2-bis(trimethylsilyl)trisilane

Identifiers
CAS Number	4098-98-0
3D model (JSmol)	Interactive image
ChemSpider	121756
ECHA InfoCard	100.156.064
PubChem CID	138115
CompTox Dashboard (EPA)	DTXSID10193977
- InChI: InChI=1S/C12H36Si5/c1-13(2,3)17(14(4,5)6,15(7,8)9)16(10,11)12/h1-12H3 Key: BOJSDHZZKKYWAS-UHFFFAOYSA-N
- SMILES: C[Si](C)(C)[Si]([Si](C)(C)C)([Si](C)(C)C)[Si](C)(C)C

Properties
Chemical formula	C_{12}H_{36}Si_{5}
Molar mass	320.845 g·mol^{−1}
Appearance	colorless solid
Density	0.806 g/cm^{3}
Melting point	319–321 °C (606–610 °F; 592–594 K) sealed tube

Hazards
- GHS labelling
Pictograms	(GHS07: Exclamation mark)
Signal word	Warning
Hazard statements	H315, H319, H335
Precautionary statements	P261, P264, P271, P280, P302+P352, P304+P340, P305+P351+P338, P312, P321, P332+P313, P337+P313, P362, P403+P233, P405, P501
- Except where otherwise noted, data are given for materials in their standard state (at 25 °C [77 °F], 100 kPa). Infobox references

Tetrakis(trimethylsilyl)silane is the organosilicon compound with the formula (Me_{3}Si)_{4}Si (where Me = CH_{3}). It is a colorless sublimable solid with a high melting point. The molecule has tetrahedral symmetry. The compound is notable as having silicon bonded to four other silicon atoms, like in elemental silicon.

== Preparation and reactions ==
The compound is prepared by the reaction of trimethylsilyl chloride, silicon tetrachloride, and lithium:

4 Me_{3}SiCl + SiCl_{4} + 8 Li → (Me_{3}Si)_{4}Si + 8 LiCl

The compound is a precursor to tris(trimethylsilyl)silyl lithium by reaction with methyl lithium:

(Me_{3}Si)_{4}Si + MeLi → (Me_{3}Si)_{3}SiLi + Me_{4}Si

The organolithium compound (Me_{3}Si)_{3}SiLi is a versatile reagent, e.g. to tris(trimethylsilyl)silane ((Me_{3}Si)_{3}SiH).

== See also ==
- Tris(trimethylsilyl)methane
