= Vinyltriethoxysilane =

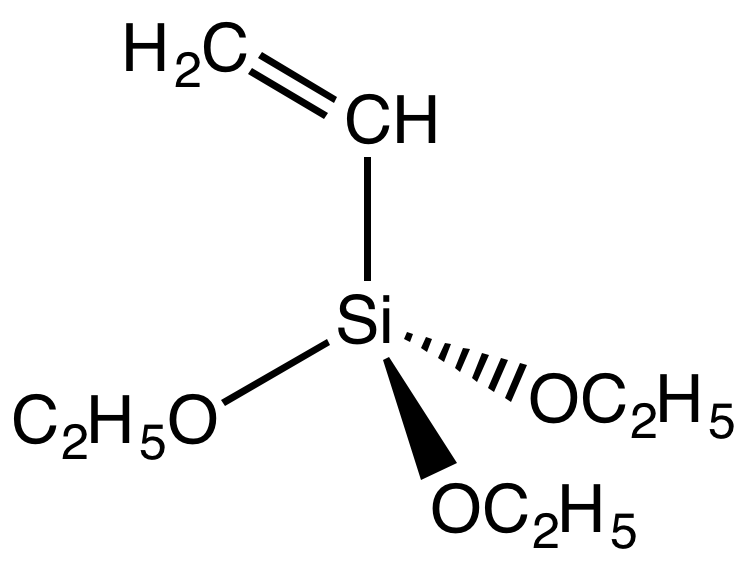

Names
- Preferred IUPAC name Ethenyltri(ethoxy)silane
- Other names Triethoxyvinylsilane

Identifiers
CAS Number	78-08-0
3D model (JSmol)	Interactive image
ChemSpider	6269
ECHA InfoCard	100.000.984
PubChem CID	6516
UNII	8V1TKX755V
CompTox Dashboard (EPA)	DTXSID3044463
- InChI: InChI=1S/C8H18O3Si/c1-5-9-12(8-4,10-6-2)11-7-3/h8H,4-7H2,1-3H3 Key: FWDBOZPQNFPOLF-UHFFFAOYSA-N
- SMILES: CCO[Si](C=C)(OCC)OCC

Properties
Chemical formula	C_{8}H_{18}O_{3}Si
Molar mass	190.31
Appearance	Colorless liquid
Density	0.903 g/cm^{3}
Boiling point	160–161 °C (320–322 °F; 433–434 K)
- Except where otherwise noted, data are given for materials in their standard state (at 25 °C [77 °F], 100 kPa). Infobox references

Vinyltriethoxysilane is an organosilicon compound with the formula (C_{2}H_{5}O)_{3}SiCH=CH_{2}. It is a colorless liquid. The compound is bifunctional, featuring both a vinyl group and hydrolytically sensitive ethoxysilyl groups. As such it is a crosslinking agent.

== Applications ==
Vinyltriethoxysilane and the related vinyltrimethoxysilane are used as monomers and comonomer for polymers such as ethylene-vinyltrimethoxysilane and ethylene-vinyl acetate-vinyltrimethoxysilane. Vinyltrialkoxysilanes are also used as cross-linking agents during the manufacture of cross-linked polyethylene (PEX). The alkoxysilane moiety is reactive toward water, and in the presence of moisture, it forms silicon-oxygen-silicon bonds that cross-link the material to cure it. Moisture-curable polymers are used as electrical insulation in some kinds of cables and for water pipe in under-floor heating installations.

Vinyltrialkoxysilanes are also used as a coupling agents or adhesion promoters for treatment of glass fibers and particulate minerals in order to form stronger bonds with resin and produce fiberglass with better mechanical properties. Amino-functional silanes such as (3-aminopropyl)triethoxysilane and epoxy-functional silanes are used for the same purpose. The silane group attaches to the glass substrate via covalent Si-O-Si bond, while the resin reacts with the vinyl-, amino-, or epoxy- group and binds to it.
