= Ian Fleming (chemist) =

English chemist and science writer

Ian Fleming FRS
- Born: Ian Fleming; 4 August 1935 (age 91); Staffordshire, England
- Education: Pembroke College, Cambridge
- Spouse: Mary Bernard
- Awards: Tilden Prize (1980)
- Scientific career
- Fields: Organic chemistry Organosilicon chemistry
- Workplaces: University of Cambridge
- Thesis: (1962)
- Doctoral advisor: John Harley-Mason

Ian Fleming (born 4 August 1935) is an English organic chemist, an emeritus professor of the University of Cambridge, and an emeritus fellow of Pembroke College, Cambridge. He was the first to determine the full structure of chlorophyll (in 1967) and was involved in the development of the synthesis of cyanocobalamin by Robert Burns Woodward. He has made major contributions to the use of organosilicon compounds for stereoselective syntheses; reactions which have found application in the synthesis of natural compounds. He is also a prolific author, and has written a number of textbooks, encyclopedia chapters and influential review articles.

== Early life and education ==
Ian Fleming was born on 4 August 1935, in Kingswinford, Staffordshire and grew up in Stourbridge, Worcestershire, where he attended the King Edward VI Grammar School for Boys. He was accepted to study Natural Sciences at Pembroke College, Cambridge but first joined the Royal Corps of Signals to complete compulsory National Service, in 1954–1956. He was commissioned as a second lieutenant.

He graduated with a B.A. in 1959 from the University of Cambridge and immediately started research in the Department of Chemistry, under the supervision of John Harley-Mason, studying decarboxylative elimination and the chemistry of enamines. He completed his Ph.D. in 1962.

== Career ==
Fleming obtained a research fellowship at Pembroke College in 1962. In 1963–1964 he spent a post-doctoral year at Harvard University with R.B. Woodward working on the synthesis of vitamin B_{12}. He returned to Cambridge in autumn 1964 when appointed by Lord Todd as a University Demonstrator. He was promoted and by 1986 was a Reader; in 1998 he became a Professor of Organic Chemistry. Throughout the period 1964–2002 he was a Fellow and assistant director of Studies in Natural Sciences at Pembroke College. He was obliged by the statutes of the university to retire in 2002 when he reached the age of 67.

=== Teaching ===
He has authored popular undergraduate textbooks on spectroscopic methods of structure determination, organic synthesis, and applications of frontier molecular orbital theory to problems in organic chemistry. The book Spectroscopic Methods in Organic Chemistry, which he co-wrote with Dudley Williams, was first published in 1966 and had reached edition six and been translated into multiple languages by the time of Williams' death in 2010. Fleming published a seventh edition in 2019, following his teaching a one-semester course on the subject at the University of Illinois for seven years from 2012 to 2018. According to John Sulston, Fleming in the 1960s "was young, personable and really sparky about how things worked".

As of 2025, although formally retired, Fleming continues to give a course of six lectures on organic spectroscopy to third-year undergraduates in the Cambridge Chemistry Department.

=== Research ===
Red and green markers in ring D of chlorophyll a where absolute stereochemistry was established

In 1967, Fleming published a paper which provided the final details of the structure of chlorophyll a by confirming the absolute configuration of the two sidechains attached to one of the rings of the macrocycle.

In 1971–1972, while on sabbatical at McGill University, Fleming worked on the synthesis of the highly stable 8-cycloheptatrienylheptafulvenyl carbocation. More significantly, during that period he developed ideas for applying silicon within organic chemistry. This led to advances in the topic of organosilicon chemistry for organic synthesis, especially for the stereoselective production of chiral molecules.

His work on what is now called the Fleming–Tamao oxidation allows the replacement of a carbon-silicon bond with a carbon-oxygen bond in a reaction which is stereospecific with retention of configuration. This allows the silicon group to be used as a functional equivalent of the hydroxyl group. In the early method shown for the C-Si bond's replacement, two steps are required: treatment with fluoroboric acid followed by an oxidation using meta-chloroperoxybenzoic acid. A one-step procedure using potassium bromide and peracetic acid in acetic acid has also been described.

He has over 200 scientific publications, including major contributions to the chemical encyclopedia "Comprehensive Organic Chemistry", and many influential review articles.

His later work, building on the application of silicon in organic chemistry he had developed, included the synthesis of the natural products thienamycin, nonactin, and sparteine.

== Selected publications ==
- Fleming, Ian; Woodward, R. B. (1973). "A synthesis of (–)-(R)-trans-β-(1,2,3-trimethylcyclopent-2-enyl)acrylic acid". J. Chem. Soc., Perkin Trans. 1: 1653–1657. doi:10.1039/P19730001653.
- Fleming, Ian (1979). "13: Organic Silicon Chemistry". In Barton, D. H. R.; Ollis, W. D. (eds.). Comprehensive Organic Chemistry. Vol. 3. Oxford: Pergamon. pp. 541–686.
- Fleming, Ian; Dunoguès, Jacques; Smithers, Roger (1989). "The Electrophilic Substitution of Allylsilanes and Vinylsilanes". Organic Reactions. Wiley. pp. 57–575. doi:10.1002/0471264180.or037.02. ISBN 978-0-471-26418-7.
- Fleming, Ian; Barbero, Asuncion; Walter, David (1997). "Stereochemical Control in Organic Synthesis Using Silicon-Containing Compounds". Chemical Reviews. 97 (6): 2063–2192. doi:10.1021/cr941074u. PMID 11848898.
- Fleming, Ian (Spring 2009). "Half a century in Lensfield Road: Ian Fleming on the people" (PDF). chem@cam (39): 11–12.
- Fleming, Ian (August 2011). Molecular Orbitals and Organic Chemical Reactions: student edition. Wiley. p. 376. ISBN 978-0-470-74659-2.
- Fleming, Ian (August 2011). Molecular Orbitals and Organic Chemical Reactions: reference edition. Wiley. p. 528. ISBN 978-1-119-96467-4.
- Fleming, Ian (2015). Pericyclic Reactions (2 ed.). Oxford University Press. p. 118. ISBN 978-0-19-968090-0.
- Fleming, Ian; Williams, Dudley (2019). Spectroscopic Methods in Organic Chemistry (7 ed.). Springer International Publishing. p. 432. ISBN 978-3-030-18251-9.

== Awards and prizes ==
- 1980 Tilden Prize of the Royal Society of Chemistry
- 1982 Honorary ScD from the University of Cambridge
- 1983 RSC Prize for Organic Synthesis
- 1993 Elected a Fellow of the Royal Society

== Personal life ==
Fleming married Mary Bernard, an author, in 1965; they have no children. His interests include photography and he has taken portraits of every Pembroke College Fellow since 1963. Some of his work is included in the 2025 book which describes the buildings and gardens of the college. Fleming has been credited as being one of those who actively campaigned for the admission of women to Pembroke.
