= Cross-linked polyethylene =

Type of plastic

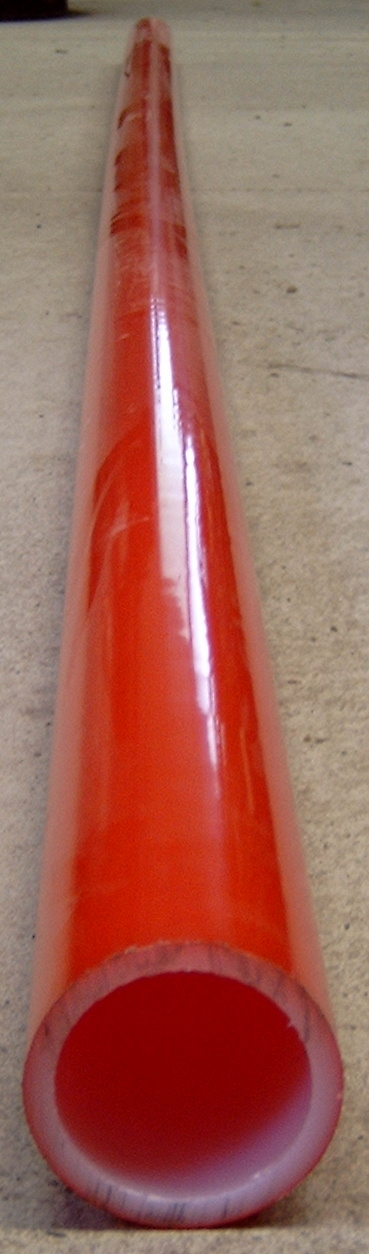
A cross-linked polyethylene (PEX) pipe

Cross-linked polyethylene, commonly abbreviated PEX, XPE or XLPE, is a form of polyethylene with cross-links. It is used predominantly in building services pipework systems, hydronic radiant heating and cooling systems, domestic water piping, insulation for high tension (high voltage or high volt in short) electrical cables, and baby play mats. It is also used for natural gas and offshore oil applications, chemical transportation, and transportation of sewage and slurries. PEX is an alternative to polyvinyl chloride (PVC), chlorinated polyvinyl chloride (CPVC) or copper tubing for use as residential water pipes.

== Properties ==
Low-temperature impact strength, abrasion resistance and environmental stress cracking resistance can be increased significantly by crosslinking, whereas hardness and rigidity are somewhat reduced. Compared to thermoplastic polyethylene, PEX does not melt (analogous to elastomers) and is thermally resistant (over longer periods of up to 120 °C, for short periods without electrical or mechanical load up to 250 °C). With increasing crosslinking density also the maximum shear modulus increases (even at higher temperatures).

Almost all PEX used for pipe and tubing is made from high-density polyethylene (HDPE). PEX contains cross-linked bonds in the polymer structure, changing the thermoplastic to a thermoset. Cross-linking is accomplished during or after the extrusion of the tubing. The required degree of cross-linking, according to ASTM Standard F876, is between 65% and 89%. A higher degree of cross-linking could result in brittleness and stress cracking of the material, while a lower degree of cross-linking could result in product with poorer physical properties.

PEX has significantly enhanced properties compared to ordinary PE. This is due to the introduction of crosslinks in the system, which can significantly improve the chemical, thermal, and mechanical properties of the polymer. While HDPE and PEX both display increases in the initial tangent modulus and yield stress under temperature or strain-rate increases when undergoing compression, HDPE tends to exhibit flow behavior after reaching a higher yield stress and PEX tends to exhibit strain-hardening after reaching its slightly lower yield stress. The latter exhibits some flow behavior but only after reaching higher true strains. The behavior observed in PEX is also mimicked by the thermoplastic ultra-high molecular weight polyethylene (UHMWPE). However, PEX displays a stronger temperature and strain-rate dependence than UHMWPE. Additionally, PEX is notable for its high thermal stability. It displays improved creep behavior (i.e. resists creep deformation) and maintains high strength and hardness at very high temperatures compared to thermoplastic polyethylene.

The type of initial polymer structure and amount of crosslinking can have a large impact on the resulting mechanical properties of PEX. Increased cross-linking is associated with higher Young's modulus and higher tensile strength though there is less elongation at the breaking point of PEX relative to HDPE.

Almost all cross-linkable polyethylene compounds (XLPE) for wire and cable applications are based on LDPE. XLPE-insulated cables have a rated maximum conductor temperature of 90 °C and an emergency rating up to 140 °C, depending on the standard used. They have a conductor short-circuit rating of 250 °C. XLPE has excellent dielectric properties, making it useful for medium voltage—1 to 69 kV AC, and high-voltage cables—up to 380 kV AC-voltage, and several hundred kV DC.

== Preparation methods ==
Various methods can be used to prepare PEX from thermoplastic polyethylene (PE-LD, PE-LLD or PE-HD). The first PEX material was prepared in the 1930s, by irradiating the extruded tube with an electron beam. The electron beam processing method was made feasible in the 1970s, but was still expensive. In the 1960s, Engel cross-linking was developed. In this method, a peroxide is mixed with the HDPE before extruding. In 1968, the Sioplas process using silicon hydride (silane) was patented, followed by another silane-based process, Monosil, in 1974. A process using vinylsilane followed in 1986.

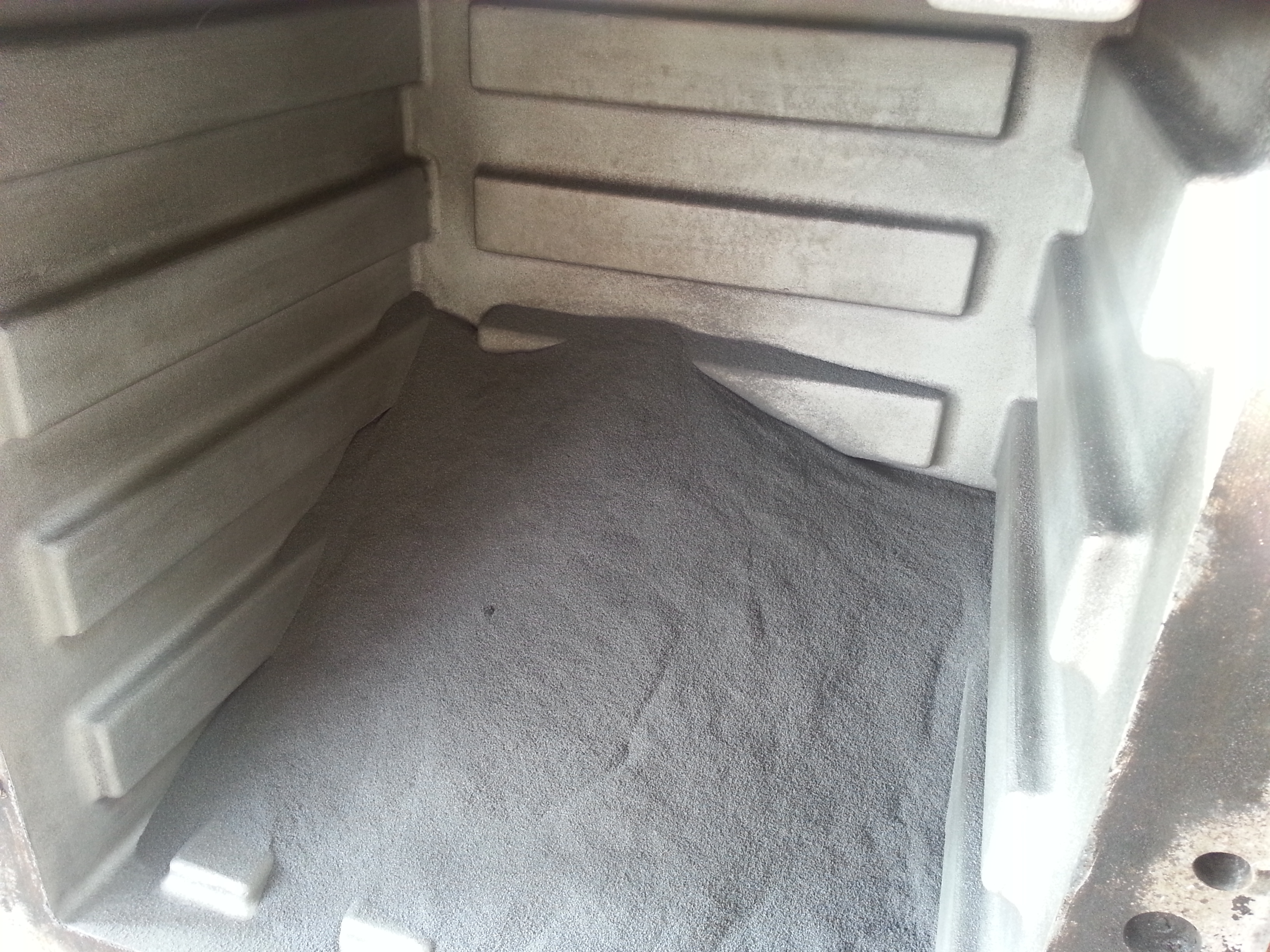
Raw material: XLPE powder used in rotational molding in a factory

=== Types of crosslinking ===
A basic distinction is made between peroxide crosslinking (PE-Xa), silane crosslinking (PE-Xb), electron beam crosslinking (PE-Xc) and azo crosslinking (PE-Xd).

Shown are the peroxide, the silane and irradiation crosslinking. In each method, a hydrogen atom is removed from the polyethylene chain (top center), either by radiation (hν) or by peroxides (R-O-O-R), forming a radical. Then, two radical chains can crosslink, either directly (bottom left) or indirectly via silane compounds (bottom right).

- Peroxide crosslinking (PE-Xa): The crosslinking of polyethylene using peroxides (e.g. dicumyl peroxide or di-tert-butyl peroxide) is still of major importance. In the so-called Engel process, a mixture of HDPE and 2% peroxide is at first mixed at low temperatures in an extruder and then crosslinked at high temperatures (between 200 °C and 250 °C). The peroxide decomposes to peroxide radicals (RO•), which abstract (remove) hydrogen atoms from the polymer chain, leading to radicals. When these combine, a crosslinked network is formed. The resulting polymer network is uniform, of low tension and high flexibility, whereby it is softer and tougher than (the irradiated) PE-Xc. The same process is used for LDPE as well, though the temperature may vary from 160 °C to 220 °C.
- Silane crosslinking (PE-Xb): In the presence of silanes (e.g. trimethoxyvinylsilane) polyethylene can initially be Si-functionalized by irradiation or by a small amount of a peroxide. Later Si-OH groups can be formed in a water bath by hydrolysis, which condense then and crosslink the PE by the formation of Si-O-Si bridges. [16] Catalysts such as dibutyltin dilaurate may accelerate the reaction.
- Irradiation crosslinking (PE-Xc): The crosslinking of polyethylene is also possible by a downstream radiation source (usually an electron accelerator, occasionally an isotopic radiator). PE products are crosslinked below the crystalline melting point by splitting off hydrogen atoms. β-radiation possesses a penetration depth of 10 mm, ɣ-radiation 100 mm. Thereby the interior or specific areas can be excluded from the crosslinking. However, due to high capital and operating costs, radiation crosslinking plays only a minor role compared with the peroxide crosslinking. In contrast to peroxide crosslinking, the process is carried out in the solid state. Thereby, the cross-linking takes place primarily in the amorphous regions, while the crystallinity remains largely intact.
- Azo crosslinking (PE-Xd): In the so-called Lubonyl process polyethylene is crosslinked preadded azo compounds after extrusion in a hot salt bath.

=== Degree of crosslinking ===
A low degree of crosslinking leads initially only to a multiplication of the molecular weight. The individual macromolecules are not linked and no covalent network is formed yet. Polyethylene that consists of those large molecules behaves similar to polyethylene of ultra high molecular weight (PE-UHMW), i.e. like a thermoplastic elastomer.

Upon further crosslinking (crosslinking degree about 80%), the individual macromolecules are eventually connected to a network. This crosslinked polyethylene (PE-X) is chemically seen a thermoset, it shows above the melting point rubber-elastic behavior and cannot be processed in the melt anymore.

The degree of crosslinking (and hence the extent of the change) is different in intensity depending on the process. According to DIN 16892 (a quality requirement for pipes made of PE-X) at least the following degree of crosslinking must be achieved:

- in peroxide crosslinking (PE-Xa): 75%
- with silane crosslinking (PE-Xb): 65%
- with electron beam crosslinking (PE-Xc): 60%
- in azo crosslinking (PE-Xd): 60%

== Classification ==
=== North America ===
All PEX pipe is manufactured with its design specifications listed directly on the pipe. These specifications are listed to explain the pipe's many standards as well as giving specific detailing about the manufacturer. The reason that all these specifications are given, are so that the installer is aware if the product is meeting standards for the necessary local codes. The labeling ensures the user that the tubing is up to all the standards listed.

Materials used in PEX pipes in North America are defined by cell classifications that are described in ASTM standards, the most common being ASTM F876. Cell classifications for PEX include 0006, 0008, 1006, 1008, 3006, 3008, 5006 and 5008, the most common being 5006. Classifications 0306, 3306, 5206 and 5306 are also common, these materials containing ultraviolet blockers and/or inhibitors for limited UV resistance. In North America all PEX tubing products are manufactured to ASTM, NSF and CSA product standards, among them the aforementioned ASTM standard F876 as well as F877, NSF International standards NSF 14 and NSF 61 ("NSF-pw"), and Canadian Standards Association standard B137.5, to which the pipes are tested, certified and listed. The listings and certifications met by each product appear on the printline of the pipe or tubing to ensure the product is used in the proper applications for which it was designed.

=== Europe ===
In European standards. there are three classifications referred to as PEX-A, -B, and -C. The classes are not related to any type of rating system.

==== PEX-A (PE-Xa, PEXa) ====
PEX-A is produced by the peroxide (Engel) method. This method performs "hot" cross-linking, above the crystal melting point. However, the process takes slightly longer than the other two methods as the polymer has to be kept at high temperature and pressure for long periods during the extrusion process. The cross-linked bonds are between carbon atoms.

==== PEX-B (PE-Xb, PEXb) ====
The silane method, also called the "moisture cure" method, results in PEX-B. In this method, cross-linking is performed in a secondary post-extrusion process, producing cross-links between a cross-linking agent. The process is accelerated with heat and moisture. The cross-linked bonds are formed through silanol condensation between two grafted vinyltrimethoxysilane (VTMS) units, connecting the polyethylene chains with C-C-Si-O-Si-C-C bridges.

==== PEX-C (PE-Xc, PEXc) ====
PEX-C is produced through electron beam processing, in a "cold" cross-linking process (below the crystal melting point). It provides less uniform, lower-degree cross-linking than the Engel method, especially at tube diameters over one inch (2.5 cm). When the process is not controlled properly, the outer layer of the tube may become brittle. However, it is the cleanest, most environmentally friendly method of the three, since it does not involve other chemicals and uses only high-energy electrons to split the carbon-hydrogen bonds and facilitate cross-linking.

== Plumbing ==
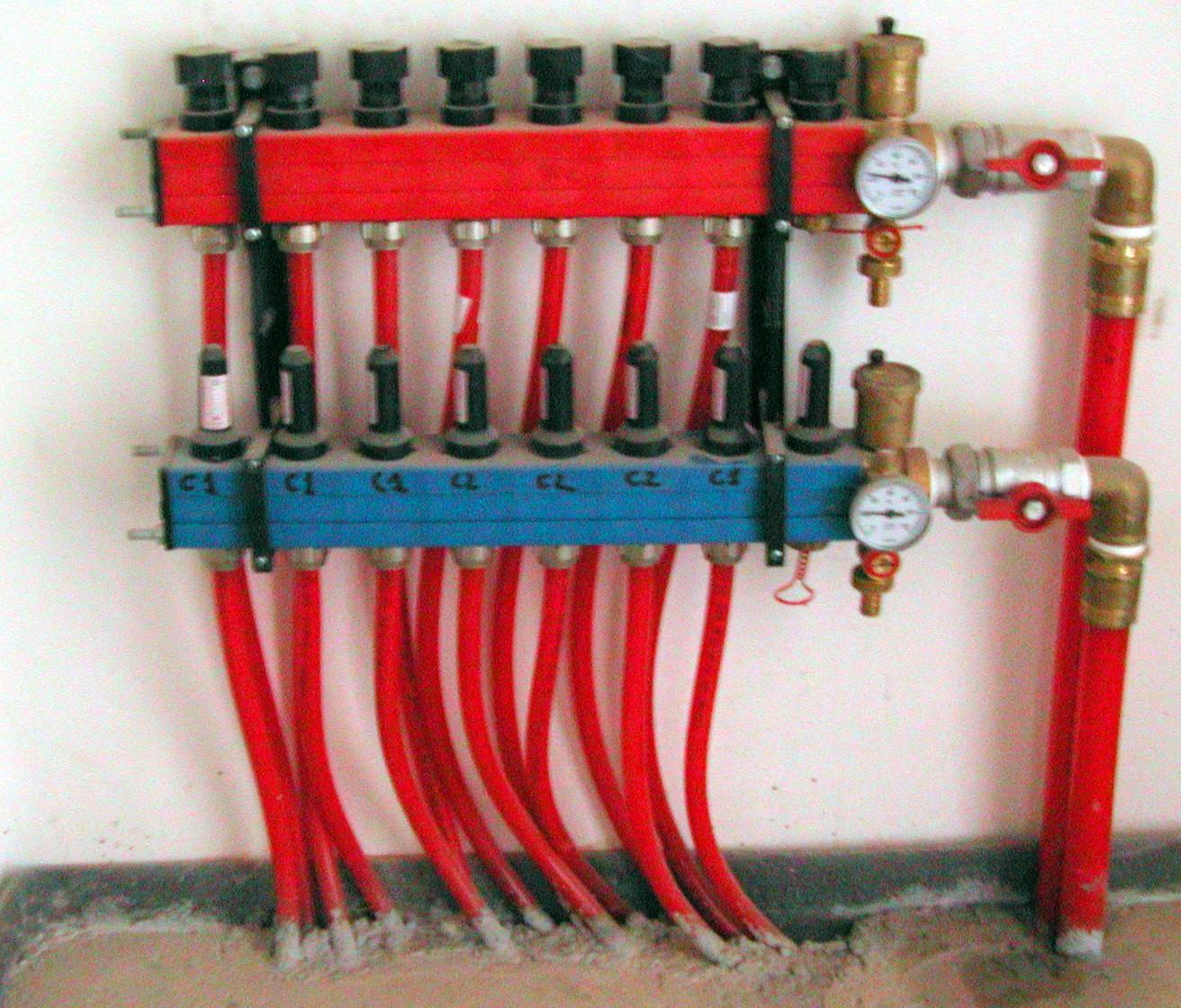
Radiant heating system manifold using PEX tubing

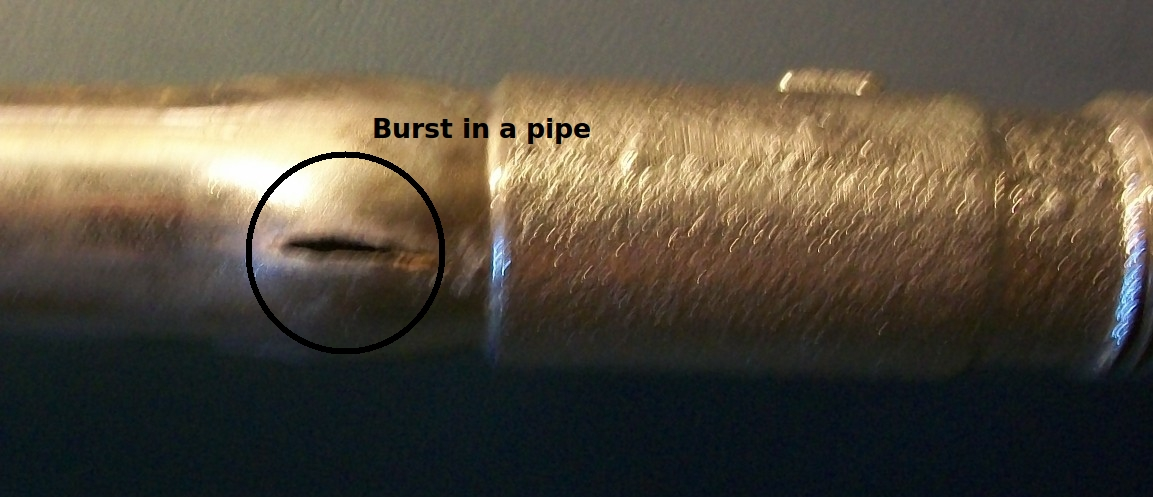
This copper exterior valve has burst from freezing; several reports suggest that PEX takes longer to burst under freezing conditions.

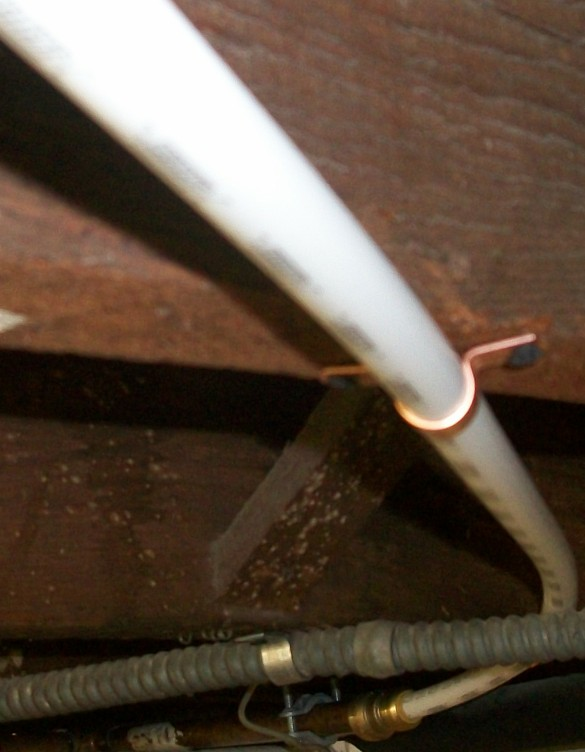
PEX's flexibility allows for fewer connections, better water flow, and faster, simpler, and less expensive installation than comparable materials.

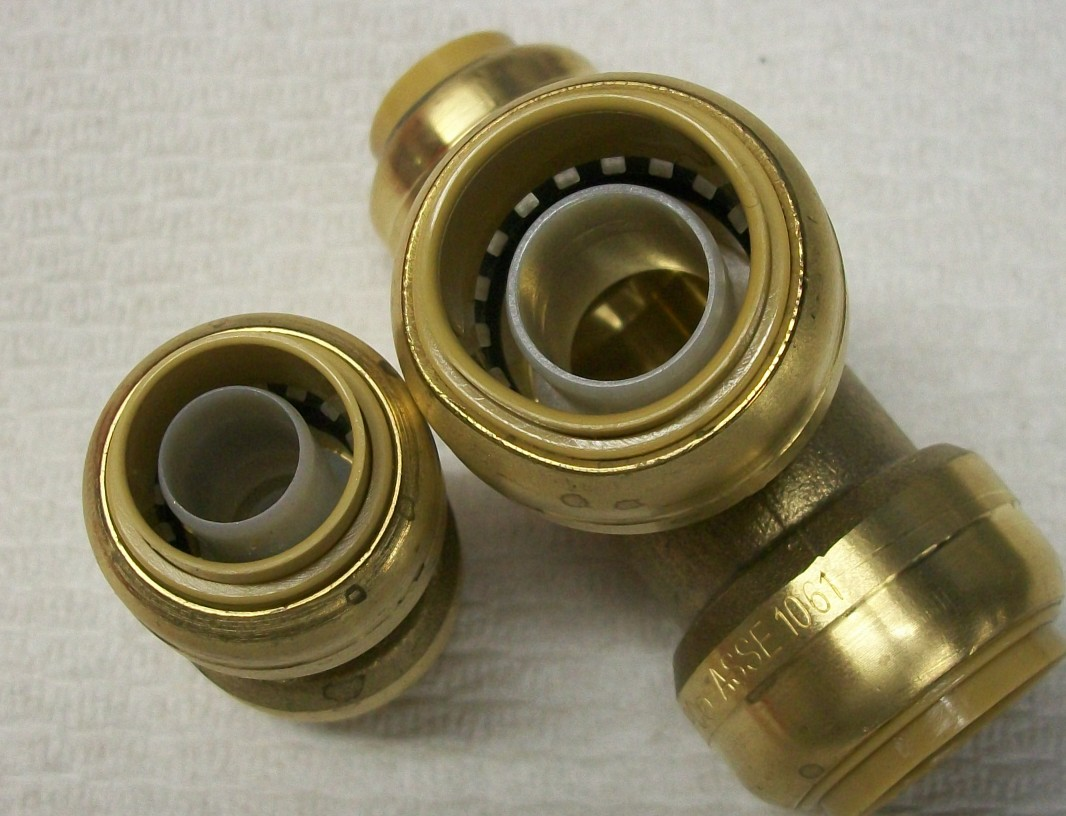
A PEX push fitting allows an installer to join copper and PEX pipes by simply pushing them together for a watertight fit.

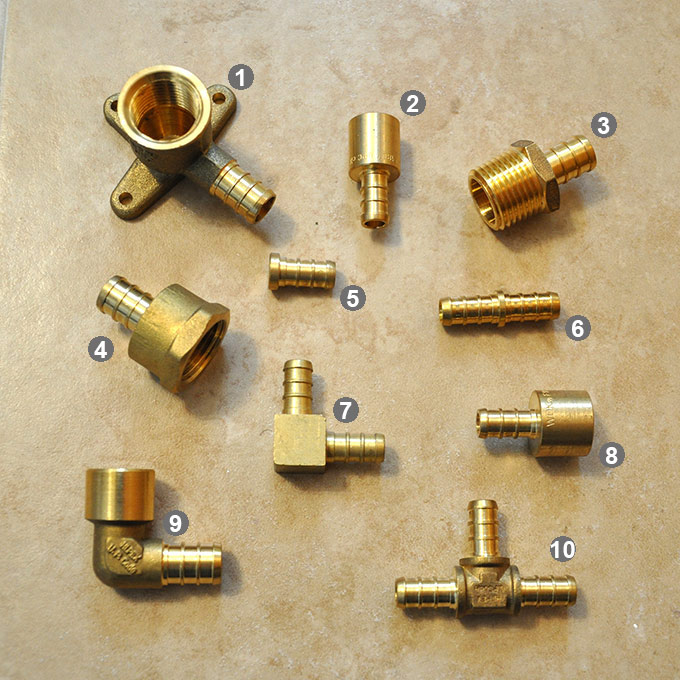
Brass crimp fittings, another popular type of fittings primarily used for connection PEX to PEX, PEX to Threaded pipes. 1.Drop Ear Elbows connect PEX and threaded pipe at a 90-degree 2.PEX to Copper Solder Adapter 3.PEX to Copper Threaded Adapter 4.PEX to Female Threaded Adapter 5.PEX Plug - terminate end of pipe 6.PEX to PEX Coupling 7.PEX to PEX 90-degree Elbow 8.PEX to Copper Adapter 9.PEX to Copper 90-degree Elbow 10. PEX x PEX x PEX 3-way PEX Tee.

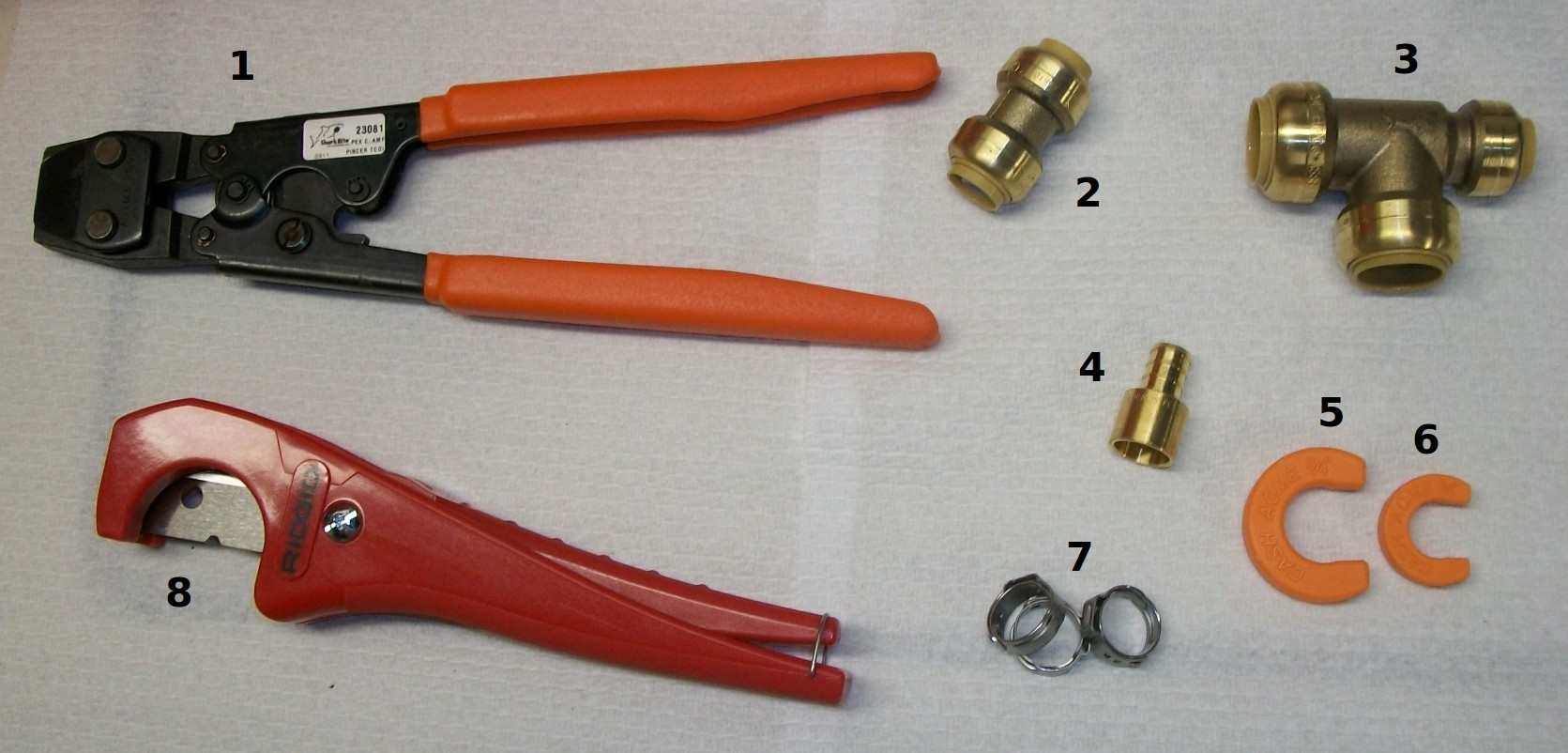
Tools and fittings used in a plumbing installation with PEX piping. (1) crimping tool to squeeze a metal band to join a pipe and a fitting (2) compression coupling joining two 1/2 inch pipes (copper or PEX) (3) "T-joint" to connect 3/4", 3/4", and 1/2" pipes (4) Copper-to-PEX 1/2" connection (requires soldering) (5 and 6) tools to undo PEX connections (7) crimp rings to squeeze metal band to connect PEX to a fixture (8) PEX tube cutter.

PEX tubing is widely used to replace copper in plumbing applications. One estimate from 2006 was that residential use of PEX for delivering drinking water to home faucets was increasing by 40% annually. In 2006, The Philadelphia Inquirer recommended that plumbing installers switch from copper pipes to PEX.

In the early to mid 20th century, mass-produced plumbing pipes were made from galvanized steel. As users experienced problems with the internal build-up of rust, which reduced water volume, these were replaced by copper pipes in the late 1960s. Plastic pipes with fittings using glue were used as well in later decades. Initially PEX tubing was the most popular way to transport water in hydronic radiant heating systems, and it was used first in hydronic systems from the 1960s onwards. Hydronic systems circulate water from a boiler or heater to places in the house needing heat, such as baseboard heaters or radiators. PEX is suitable for recirculating hot water.

Gradually, PEX became more accepted for more indoor plumbing uses, such as carrying pressurized water to fixtures throughout the house. Increasingly, since the 2000s, copper pipes as well as plastic PVC pipes are being replaced with PEX. PEX can be used for underground purposes, although one report suggested that appropriate "sleeves" be used for such applications.

=== Benefits ===
Benefits of using PEX in plumbing include:

- Flexibility. PEX is a popular solution for residential water plumbing in new construction due to its flexibility. PEX tubing can easily bend without buckling or cracking, so pipe runs do not need to be straight. PEX is often sold in long rolls, which eliminates the need to couple individual lengths of straight pipe together for long runs. For shallow bends, PEX tubing can be bent and supported with a metal or hard plastic brace, so elbow fittings are only required for sharp corners. By contrast, other common indoor plumbing materials—namely PVC, CPVC and copper—are rigid and require angled fittings to accommodate any significant bend in a pipe run.
- Direct routing of pipes. Since PEX tubing does not require elbow joints in most cases, it is often possible to run a supply line directly from a distribution point to an outlet fixture without any splices or connections in the line. This eliminates the potential structural weakness or cost associated with joints.
- Less pressure drop due to turbulence. Since PEX pipe lines typically have fewer sharp turns and splices than lines constructed from rigid tube materials, less pressure loss can be expected between the distribution point and outlet fixtures. Less pressure drop translates to extra water pressure at sinks, showers, and toilets for a given supply pressure. Conversely, PEX may allow for a weaker (and less expensive) pump than alternative piping to achieve the equivalent pressure at the outlet fixtures.
- Lower materials cost. Cost of materials for PEX tubing is approximately 25% of alternatives. By contrast, the inflation-adjusted price of copper more than quadrupled in the two decades between 2002 and 2022.
- Easier installation. Installing PEX is much less labor-intensive than copper or PVC pipes, since there is no need to solder or glue pipes together. Builders installing radiant heating systems found that PEX pipes "made installation easy and operation problem-free". PEX connections can be made by pushing two matching parts together using a compression fitting, or by using an adjustable wrench or a special crimping tool. Generally, fewer connections and fittings are needed in a PEX installation.
- Non-corrosive. Unlike copper, PEX is not subject to corrosion when exposed to minerals or moisture.
- No fire risk during installation. The oldest and most common method for joining copper piping is to solder pieces together using a torch. PEX eliminates the risk associated with this open flame.
- Ability to merge new PEX with existing copper and PVC systems. Fittings that allow installers to join a copper pipe on one end with a PEX line at the other are widely available. These couplings allow the installer to reduce or expand the diameter of the pipes at the transition to PEX if desired.
- Suitable for hot and cold pipes. A convenient arrangement is to use color-coding to lessen the possibility of confusion. Typically, red PEX tubing is used for hot water and blue PEX tubing is used for cold water.
- Less likely to burst from freezing. PEX, due to its flexibility, is typically understood to be more burst-resistant in freezing conditions than copper or PVC pipe. One account suggested that PEX water-filled pipes, frozen over time, will swell and tear; in contrast, copper pipe "rips" and PVC "shatters". Home expert Steve Maxwell suggested in 2007 that PEX water-filled pipes could endure "five or six freeze-thaw cycles without splitting" while copper would split apart promptly on the first freeze. In new unheated seasonal homes, it is still recommended to drain pipes during an unheated cold season or take other measures to prevent pipes from bursting because of the cold. In new construction, it is recommended that all water pipes be sloped slightly to permit drainage, if necessary.
- Pipe insulation possible. Conventional foam wrap insulation materials can easily be added to PEX piping to reduce heat loss from hot water water lines, reduce heat transfer into cold water lines, and mitigate the risk of freezing in outdoor environments.

=== Drawbacks ===
- Degradation from sunlight. PEX tubing cannot be used in applications exposed to sunlight, as it degrades fairly rapidly. Prior to installation it must be stored away from sunlight, and needs to be shielded from daylight after installation. Leaving it exposed to direct sunlight for as little as 30 days may result in premature failure of the tubing due to embrittlement.
- Perforation by insects. PEX tubing is vulnerable to being perforated by the mouthparts of plant-feeding insects; in particular, the Western conifer seed bug (Leptoglossus occidentalis) is known to sometimes pierce through PEX tubing, resulting in leakage.
- Problems with yellow brass fittings. There have been some claimed PEX systems failures in the U.S., Canada and Europe resulting in several pending class action lawsuits. The failures are claimed to be a result of the brass fittings used in the PEX system. Generally, builders and manufacturers have learned from these experiences and have found the best materials for use in fittings used to connect pipe with connectors, valves and other fittings. But there were problems reported with a specific type of brass fitting used in connection with installations in Nevada that caused a negative interaction between its mineral-rich hard water and so-called "yellow brass" fittings. Zinc in the fittings leached into the pipe material in a chemical reaction known as dezincification, causing some leaks or blockages. A solution was to replace the yellow brass fittings, which had 30% zinc, with red brass fittings, which had 5–10% zinc. It led California building authorities to insist on fittings made from "red brass" which typically has a lower zinc content, and is unlikely to cause problems in the future since problems with these specific fittings have become known.
- Initial adjustment to a new plumbing system. There were a few reported problems in the early stages as plumbers and homeowners learned to adjust to the new fittings, and when connections were poorly or improperly made, but home inspectors have generally not noticed any problems with PEX since 2000.
- Limited adhesives for pipe insulation. Some pipe insulation applied to PEX using certain adhesives could have a detrimental effect causing the pipe to age prematurely; however, other insulating materials can be used, such as conventional foam wrap insulation, without negative effects.
- Fitting expenses. Generally, PEX fittings, particularly the do-it-yourself push-fit ones, are more expensive than copper ones, although there is no soldering required. Due to the flexibility of PEX, it generally requires fewer fittings, which tends to offset the higher cost per fitting.
- Potential problems for PEX radiant heating with iron-based components. If plain PEX tubing is used in a radiant heating system that has ferrous radiators or other parts, meaning they are made out of iron or its alloys, then there is the possibility of rust developing over time; if this is the case, then one solution is to have an "oxygen barrier" in these systems to prevent rust from developing. Most modern installations of PEX for heating use oxygen barrier coated PEX.
- Odors, chemical taste, and possible health effects. There was controversy in California during the 2000s about health concerns. Several groups blocked adoption of PEX for concerns about chemicals getting into the water, either from chemicals outside the pipes, or from chemicals inside the pipes such as methyl tertiary butyl ether and tertiary butyl alcohol. These concerns delayed statewide adoption of PEX for almost a decade. After substantial "back-and-forth legal wrangling", which was described as a "judicial rollercoaster", the disputing groups came to a consensus, and California permitted use of PEX in all occupancies. An environmental impact report and subsequent studies determined there were no cause for concerns about public health from use of PEX piping.

=== Government approvals ===
PEX has been approved for use in all fifty states of the United States as well as Canada, including the state of California, which approved its use in 2009. California allowed the use of PEX for domestic water systems on a case-by-case basis only in 2007. This was due mostly to concerns about corrosion of the manifolds (rather than the tubing itself) and California allowed PEX to be used for hydronic radiant heating systems but not potable water. In 2009, the Building Standards Commission approved PEX plastic pipe and tubing to the California Plumbing Code (CPC), allowing its use in hospitals, clinics, residences, and commercial construction throughout the state. Formal adoption of PEX into the CPC occurred on August 1, 2009, allowing local jurisdictions to approve its general use, although there were additional issues, and new approvals were issued in 2010 with revised wordings to the 2007 act.

=== Alternative materials ===
Alternative plumbing choices include

- Aluminum plastic composite are aluminum tubes laminated on the interior and exterior with plastic layers for protection.
- Corrugated stainless steel tubing, continuous flexible pipes made out of stainless steel with a PVC interior and are air-tested for leaks.
- Polypropylene Pipe, similar in application to CPVC but a chemically inert material containing no harmful substances and reduced dangerous emissions when consumed by fire. It is primarily utilized in radiant floor systems but is gaining popularity as a leach-free domestic potable water pipe, primarily in commercial applications.
- Polybutylene (PB) Pipe is a form of plastic polymer that was used in the manufacture of potable water piping from late 1970s until 1995. However, it was discovered that the polyoxymethylene (POM or Acetal) connectors originally used to connect the polybutylene tubes were susceptible to stress enhanced chemical attack by hypochlorite additions (a common chemical used to sanitize water). Degraded connectors can crack and leak in highly stressed crimped areas, causing damage to the surrounding building structure. Later systems containing copper fittings do not appear to have issues with hypochlorite attack, but polybutylene has still fallen out of favor due to costly structural damage caused by earlier issues and is not accepted in Canada and U.S.

=== PEX-AL-PEX ===
PEX-AL-PEX pipes, or AluPEX, or PEX/Aluminum/PEX, or Multilayer pipes are made of a layer of aluminum sandwiched between two layers of PEX. The metal layer serves as an oxygen barrier, stopping the oxygen diffusion through the polymer matrix, so it cannot dissolve into the water in the tube and corrode the metal components of the system. The aluminum layer is thin, typically 1 or 2 mm, and provides some rigidity to the tube such that when bent it retains the shape formed (normal PEX tube will spring back to straight). The aluminum layer also provides additional structural rigidity such that the tube will be suitable for higher safe operating temperatures and pressures.

The use of AluPex tubing has grown greatly since 2010. It is easy to work and position. Curves may be easily formed by hand. Tube exists for use with both hot and cold water and also for gas.

The Kitec system, a PEX-Aluminum-PEX composite pipe product formerly sold in Canada, was discontinued following widespread premature failures primarily caused by the dezincification of its brass fittings, leading to leaks and property damage.

=== PEX tools ===
There are two types of fitting that may be used. Crimped or compressive. Crimped connectors are less expensive but require a specialised crimping tool. Compression fittings are tightened with normal spanners and are designed to allow sections of the system to be easily disassembled, they are also popular for small works, esp. DIY, avoiding the need for extra tools.

A PEX tool kit includes a number of basic tools required for making fittings and connections with PEX tubing. In most cases, such kits are either bought at a local hardware store, plumbing supply store or assembled by either a home owner or a contractor. PEX tools kits range from under $100 and can go up to $300+. A typical PEX tool kit includes crimp tools, an expander tool for joining, clamp tools, PEX cutters, rings, boards, and staplers.

== See also ==
- High-density polyethylene (HDPE)
- Linear low-density polyethylene (LLDPE)
- Low-density polyethylene (LDPE)
- Medium-density polyethylene (MDPE)
- Polyolefin and cross-linked polyolefin (XLPO), used as insulator
- Stretch wrap
- Ultra-high-molecular-weight polyethylene (UHMWPE)
