= Electrophilic substitution of unsaturated silanes =

Electrophilic substitution of unsaturated silanes involves attack of an electrophile on an allyl- or vinylsilane. An allyl or vinyl group is incorporated at the electrophilic center after loss of the silyl group.

== Introduction ==
In 1948, it was discovered that allyltrimethylsilane reacts with hydrobromic acid to give (2-bromopropyl)trimethylsilane. Six years later, the generation of (2-iodoethyl)trimethylsilane from vinylsilane and HI was observed. Since then, a number of studies have firmly established the mechanism of electrophilic attack on vinyl- and allylsilanes The electron-releasing strength of the carbon-silicon bond is large, and as a result, the position of silicon in the unsaturated silane controls the site of reaction and stereoselectivity. Formation of the new carbon-carbon bond is at the γ position of allyl silanes and the β position of vinylsilanes. The robustness of silanes makes them amenable to use in synthesis; however, because silicon is less electropositive than other metals employed in electrophilic additions, stronger electrophiles are required.

(1)

== Mechanism and stereochemistry ==
=== Prevailing mechanism ===
The carbon-silicon bond is highly electron-releasing and can stabilize a positive charge in the β position through hyperconjugation. Electrophilic additions to allyl- and vinylsilanes take advantage of this, and site selectivity generally reflects this property—electrophiles become bound to the carbon γ to the silyl group. The electron-donating strength of the carbon-silicon bond is similar to that of an acetamide substituent and equal to roughly two alkyl groups. After formation of the carbon-electrophile bond, silicon elimination is assisted by a nucleophile.

(2)

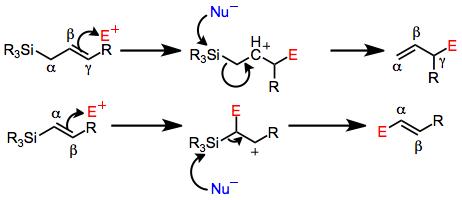

A model of the most likely reactive conformation of the allylsilane (see below) suggests that the new double bond that forms will predominantly possess the (E) configuration. However, addition of a nucleophile (such as the counterion of the electrophile) to the intermediate silyl-stabilized carbocation complicates this picture. Because the elimination to generate the double bond is stereospecifically anti, nucleophilic addition to either face of the silyl-stabilized carbanion leads to the formation of mixtures of double bond isomers. Diastereomeric mixtures of double bond isomers are common when Lewis acids are used to activate the electrophile.

(3)

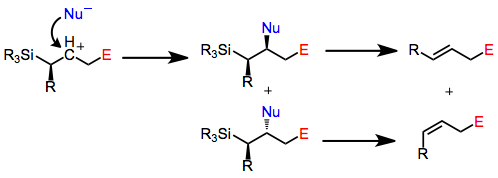

Under conditions of nucleophilic catalysis, any intermediate along the reaction pathway may incorporate a silicon-nucleophile bond. This factor does not affect the outcome unless nucleophilic attack liberates free anions or allylic transposition occurs. The latter is known to occur for hypervalent allylsilanes incorporating fluoride.

(4)

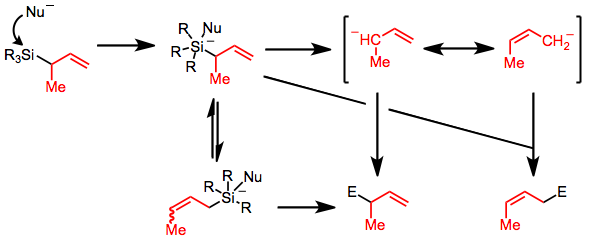

=== Stereochemistry ===
Electrophilic additions of allylsilanes generally occur via an anti S_{E}2' process. Allylsilanes react through a conformation in which the smallest substituent on the carbon attached to silicon is essentially eclipsing the double bond. The silyl moiety forces electrophilic attack on the face opposite the silyl group for steric and electronic reasons, although the effects are not large. This model predicts that when the double bond is 1,2-disubstituted, the Z isomer should exhibit greater selectivity than the E isomer, and this has been observed

(5)

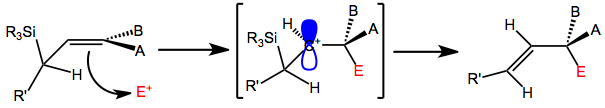

Vinylsilane additions proceed with retention of double bond configuration, and follow a similar principle. After addition of the electrophile to the top or bottom face of the double bond, the silyl moiety rotates to become parallel to the adjacent empty 2p orbital. The principle of least motion provides that the electrophile moves into a position close to that formerly occupied by the silyl group. Thus, the configuration of the double bond is retained after loss of the silyl group.

(6)

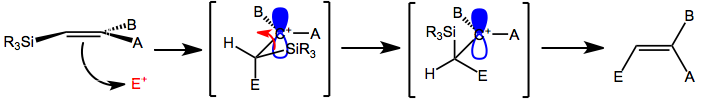

== Scope and limitations ==
Allyl- and vinylsilanes react with a variety of electrophiles under conditions of nucleophilic catalysis or Lewis acid promotion (often stoichiometric). The primary advantage of using Lewis acids versus fluoride catalysis is site selectivity—fluoride activation tends to generate allyl anions, which can then react at either the α or γ position. Use of Lewis-acid-activated electrophiles leads to reaction at only the γ position of allylsilanes.

=== Carbon electrophiles ===
Alkyl substitution can be achieved when alkyl halides are used in conjunction with a Lewis acid; however, only activated (allylic, benzylic) or highly substituted (tert-butyl) halides are useful in this context. Nucleophilic catalysis of alkylation is rare, because protodesilylation tends to occur. Lewis acid activation is more commonly employed.

(7)

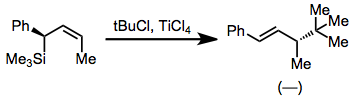

Allylsilane additions to carbonyl groups are common and synthetically useful. Vinylsilane additions are less common, as a variety of methods to access allylic alcohols are available (including epoxidation of allylsilanes; see below). If the γ position of the allylsilane is substituted, two diastereomeric products may result. In the presence of Lewis acids such as titanium tetrachloride, (E)-allylsilanes are highly selective for the syn diastereomer. (Z)-allylsilanes are much less selective (~60:40), but also favor the syn isomer.

(8)

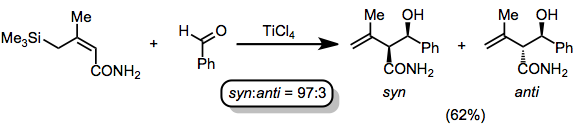

Conjugate addition reactions of allylsilanes are possible, although unsaturated aldehydes undergo only 1,2 addition. The combination of an allylsilane with an α,β-unsaturated ketone in the presence of a Lewis acid is known as the Sakurai reaction. The enolate intermediate that results from addition can be functionalized with a separate electrophile or simply protonated. Intramolecular Sakurai reactions provide ene-6-ones

(9)

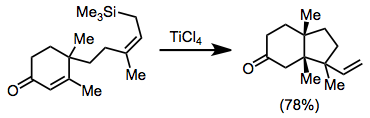

Acetals and ketals are excellent substrates for additions of allyl- and vinylsilanes. In some cases, these compounds react more cleanly than the corresponding carbonyl compounds.

(10)

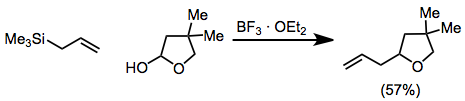

Iminium ions generated in situ in the presence of protic acid react with allylsilanes to give homoallylic amines.

(11)

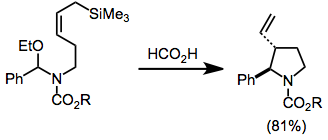

=== Other electrophiles ===
Epoxidation of allyl- and vinylsilanes can be easily accomplished with peracids. Silyl epoxides can be converted into ketones, aldehydes, or alkenes after selective epoxide opening and elimination. When allylsilanes are combined with peracids, the intermediate epoxides are usually converted to allylic alcohols before isolation.

(12)

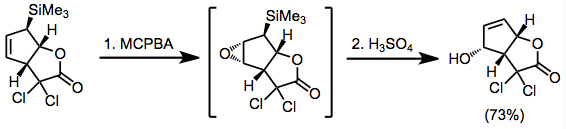

Halogen electrophiles, primarily X_{2}, react with vinyl- and allylsilanes to give a number of halogenated products. Further reaction of the initial adducts is common, and may lead, for instance, to conjugated dienes. Dienes may react further with X_{2} under the reaction conditions or undergo [4+2] cycloadditions in the presence of dienophiles.

(13)

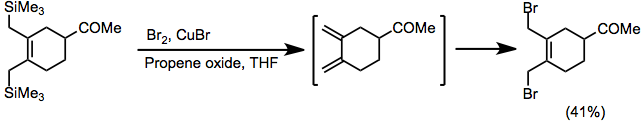

A few metal electrophiles react with allylsilanes to give interesting products. Reactions of allylsilanes with thallium tris (trifluoroacetate) form electrophilic allylthallium(II) compounds. Palladation of allylsilanes provides π-allylpalladium compounds.

(14)

== Synthetic applications ==
Addition of an allylsilane to an aldehyde is used in an efficient synthesis of tagetol.

(15)

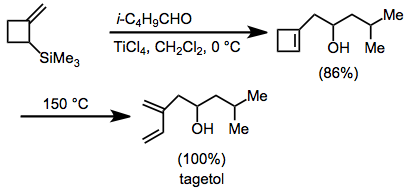

Iminium ions generated in situ may be trapped by intramolecular allysilanes. The cyclization below has been used in syntheses of isoretronecanol and epilupinine.

(16)

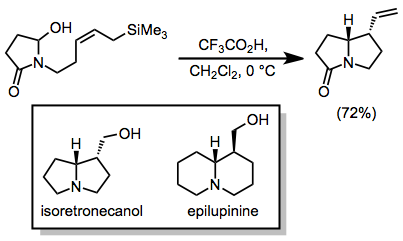

== Comparison with other methods ==
Electrophilic additions can be affected with a wide variety of organometallic reagents. Organosilanes offer the advantage of greater robustness to a wide array of reaction conditions than allyl compounds of more electropositive metals, and do not spontaneously undergo allylic rearrangement or epimerization. Additionally, organosilanes are rarely toxic and their reactions can be easily tracked by NMR spectroscopy (because of distinctive changes in the position of resonance of the methyl groups attached to silicon as addition occurs). Reactions of allylsilanes are similar in many respects to reactions of silyl enol ethers—in fact, allylsilanes can be used as masked enolate equivalents. After addition of the allylsilane, ozonolysis provides the corresponding carbonyl compound.

(17)

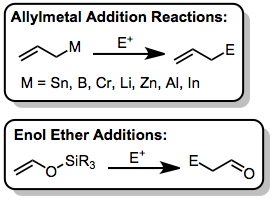
