= Vinylsilane =

Names
- Preferred IUPAC name Ethenylsilane
- Other names Vinyl silane

Identifiers
CAS Number	7291-09-0
3D model (JSmol)	Interactive image
ChemSpider	73732
ECHA InfoCard	100.027.926
EC Number	230-719-7
PubChem CID	81714
UNII	J8E4H47LQC
CompTox Dashboard (EPA)	DTXSID10894876
- InChI: InChI=1S/C2H6Si/c1-2-3/h2H,1H2,3H3 Key: UKRDPEFKFJNXQM-UHFFFAOYSA-N
- SMILES: C=C[SiH3]

Properties
Chemical formula	C_{2}H_{6}Si
Molar mass	58.155 g·mol^{−1}
Appearance	colorless gas
Boiling point	−22.8 °C (−9.0 °F; 250.3 K)

Hazards
- GHS labelling
Pictograms	(GHS07: Exclamation mark)
Signal word	Warning
Hazard statements	H317
Precautionary statements	P261, P272, P280, P302+P352, P321, P333+P317, P362+P364, P501
- Except where otherwise noted, data are given for materials in their standard state (at 25 °C [77 °F], 100 kPa). Infobox references

Vinylsilane refers to an organosilicon compound with chemical formula CH_{2}=CHSiH_{3}. It is a derivative of silane (SiH_{4}). The compound, which is a colorless gas, is mainly of theoretical interest.

== Substituted vinylsilanes ==
More commonly used than the parent vinylsilane are vinyl-substituted silanes with other substituents on silicon. In the area of organic synthesis, vinylsilanes are useful intermediates.

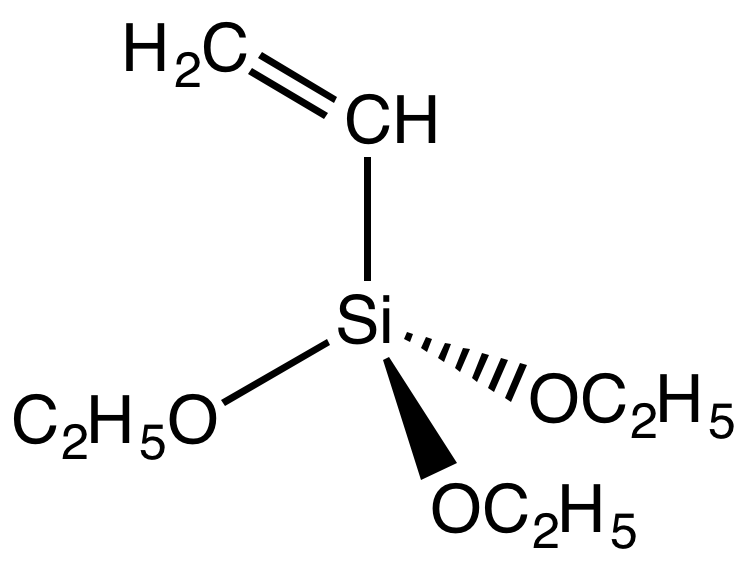
Vinyltriethoxysilane is a common vinylsilane.

In the area of polymer chemistry and materials science, vinyltrimethoxysilane or vinyltriethoxysilane serve as monomers and coupling agents.

== Preparation ==
Vinylsilanes are often prepared by hydrosilylation of alkynes. They can be made by the reaction of alkenyl lithium and Grignard reagents with chlorosilanes. In some cases dehydrogenative silylation is another method.
