= Silylenoid =

Type of chemical compound

A silylenoid in organosilicon chemistry is a type of chemical compound with the general structure R_{2}SiXM where R is any organic residue, X a halogen and M a metal. Silylenoids are the silicon pendants of carbenoid and both compounds have carbene or silylene like properties.

Silylenoids are encountered as reactive intermediates in chemical reactions. A stable silylenoid can be prepared by reaction of a fluorobromosilane with a silyllithium compound in THF:

(t-Bu_{2}MeSi)_{2}SiFBr + t-Bu_{2}MeSiLi/THF → (t-Bu_{2}MeSi)_{2}SiFLi.3THF + t-Bu_{2}MeSiBr

In this silylenoid the silicon atom is bonded with three substituents and not the usual four. X-ray diffraction shows that the Si-F bond with 170 pm is longer than usual for fluorosilanes. The F-Li bond is ionic with an estimated (in silico) positive charge of 0.88 residing on lithium and a negative charge of 0.74 on fluorine making it a (t-Bu_{2}MeSi)_{2}SiF^{−}, Li^{+}.3THF salt. The Si-F bond is likewise polarized with only 10% of the charge on silicon.

When the silylenoid is irradiated or heated a disilene forms probably via a silylene intermediate. With electrophiles it reacts as an anion and with organolithium compounds it reacts as a silylene.
