= Tris(trimethylsilyl)silane =

Names
- Preferred IUPAC name 1,1,1,3,3,3-Hexamethyl-2-(trimethylsilyl)trisilane
- Other names TTMS, supersilane

Identifiers
CAS Number	1873-77-4
3D model (JSmol)	Interactive image
ChemSpider	109749
ECHA InfoCard	100.203.666
PubChem CID	6327365
UNII	NN5K4PS2OA
CompTox Dashboard (EPA)	DTXSID70940202
- InChI: InChI=1S/C9H27Si4/c1-11(2,3)10(12(4,5)6)13(7,8)9/h1-9H3 Key: SCHZCUMIENIQMY-UHFFFAOYSA-N
- SMILES: C[Si](C)(C)[Si]([Si](C)(C)C)[Si](C)(C)C

Properties
Chemical formula	C_{9}H_{28}Si_{4}
Molar mass	248.663 g·mol^{−1}
Appearance	colorless liquid
Density	0.806 g/cm^{3}
Boiling point	82–84 °C (180–183 °F; 355–357 K) 12 Torr
- Except where otherwise noted, data are given for materials in their standard state (at 25 °C [77 °F], 100 kPa). Infobox references

Tris(trimethylsilyl)silane, also called hypersilane, is the organosilicon compound with the formula (Me_{3}Si)_{3}SiH (where Me = CH_{3}). It is a colorless liquid, and a hydrosilane: a compound with an Si-H bond.

== Preparation ==
Hypersilane can be prepared by protonation of tris(trimethylsilyl)silyl lithium, which is derived from tetrakis(trimethylsilyl)silane:

(Me_{3}Si)_{4}Si + MeLi → (Me_{3}Si)_{3}SiLi + Me_{4}Si
(Me_{3}Si)_{3}SiLi + HCl → (Me_{3}Si)_{3}SiH + LiCl

Alternatively, the reaction of trimethylsilyl chloride and trichlorosilane in the presence of lithium delivers the silane directly, but in only modest yield:

3 Me_{3}SiCl + HSiCl_{3} + 6 Li → (Me_{3}Si)_{3}SiH + 6 LiCl

== Reactions ==
The compound's Si−H bond is notably weak, with a bond dissociation energy estimated at 79–84 kcal/mol. For comparison, the Si−H bond in trimethylsilane requires 95 kcal/mol to dissociate, and the Sn−H bond in tributyltin hydride requires 74 kcal/mol. Indeed, the compound has been described as an environmentally benign analogue of tributyltin hydride. With such a weak bond, the compound is used as a reagent for hydrogen atom transfer.
