= Organosilicon chemistry =

Organometallic compound containing carbon–silicon bonds

Polydimethylsiloxane (PDMS) is the principal component of silicones.

Organosilicon chemistry is the study of organometallic compounds containing carbon–silicon bonds, to which they are called organosilicon compounds. Most organosilicon compounds are similar to the ordinary organic compounds, being colourless, flammable, hydrophobic, and stable to air.

However, silicon carbide is considered an inorganic compound.

== History ==
In 1863, Charles Friedel and James Crafts made the first organochlorosilane compound. The same year, they also described a "polysilicic acid ether" in the preparation of ethyl- and methyl-o-silicic acid. Extensive research in the field of organosilicon compounds was pioneered in the beginning of 20th century by Frederic S. Kipping. He also had coined the term "silicone" (resembling ketones, though this is erroneous) in relation to these materials in 1904. In recognition of Kipping's achievements, the Dow Chemical Company had established an award in the 1960s that is given for significant contributions to the field of silicon chemistry. In his works, Kipping was noted for using Grignard reagents to make alkylsilanes and arylsilanes and preparing silicone oligomers and polymers for the first time.

In 1945, Eugene G. Rochow also made a significant contribution to the field of organosilicon chemistry by first describing the Müller-Rochow process.

== Occurrence and applications ==
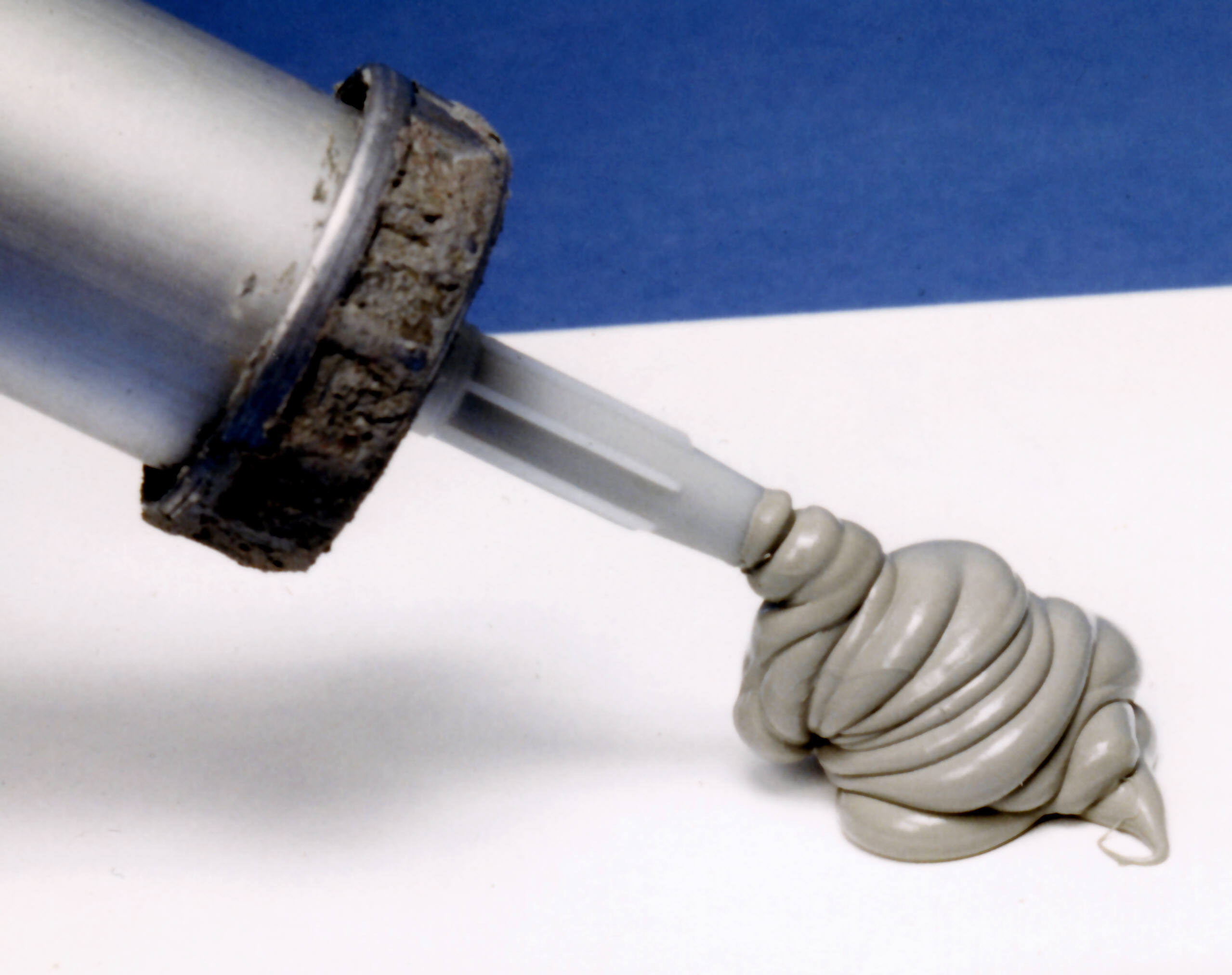
Silicone caulk, commercial sealants, are mainly composed of organosilicon compounds mixed with hardener.

Organosilicon compounds are widely encountered in commercial products. Most common are antifoamers, caulks (sealant), adhesives, and coatings made from silicones. Other important uses include agricultural and plant control adjuvants commonly used in conjunction with herbicides and fungicides.

=== Biology and medicine ===
Carbon–silicon bonds are absent in biology, however enzymes have been used to artificially create carbon-silicon bonds in living microbes. Silicates, on the other hand, have known existence in diatoms. Silafluofen is an organosilicon compound that functions as a pyrethroid insecticide. Several organosilicon compounds have been investigated as pharmaceuticals.

== Bonding ==
Bonds relevant to organosilicon chemistry
Bond	Bond length (pm)	Approx. bond strength (kJ/mol)
C–C	154	334
Si–Si	234	196
C–Si	186	314
C–H	110	414
Si–H	146	314
C–O	145	355
Si–O	159	460

Dissociation energies of bonds to silicon
Bond	Energy (kJ/mol)
Si–Si	327(10)
Si–Br	343(50)
Si–C	435(21)
Si–Cl	456(42)
Si–F	540(13)
Si–H	298.49(46)
Si–I	339(84)
Si–N	439(38)
Si–O	798(8)
Si–S	619(13)
Si–Se	531(25)
H_{3}Si–SiH_{3}	339(17)
Me_{3}Si–SiMe_{3}	339
Ar_{3}Si–SiAr_{3}	368(31)
Si–Te	506(38)

In the great majority of organosilicon compounds, Si is tetravalent with tetrahedral molecular geometry. Compared to carbon–carbon bonds, carbon–silicon bonds are longer and weaker.

The C–Si bond is somewhat polarised towards carbon due to carbon's greater electronegativity (C 2.55 vs Si 1.90), and single bonds from Si to electronegative elements are very strong. Silicon is thus susceptible to nucleophilic attack by O^{−}, Cl^{−}, or F^{−}; the energy of an Si–O bond in particular is strikingly high. This feature is exploited in many reactions such as the Sakurai reaction, the Brook rearrangement, the Fleming–Tamao oxidation, and the Peterson olefination.

The Si–C bond (1.89 Å) is significantly longer than a typical C–C bond (1.54 Å), suggesting that silyl substitutents have less steric demand than their organyl analogues. When geometry allows, silicon exhibits negative hyperconjugation, reversing the usual polarization on neighboring atoms.

== Preparation ==
The first organosilicon compound, tetraethylsilane, was prepared by Charles Friedel and James Crafts in 1863 by reaction of tetrachlorosilane with diethylzinc.

Most organosilicon compounds derive from organosilicon chlorides (CH_{3})_{4−x}SiCl_{x}. These methyl chlorides are produced by the "Direct process", which entails the reaction of methyl chloride with a silicon-copper alloy. The main and most sought-after product is dimethyldichlorosilane:

2 CH_{3}Cl + Si → (CH_{3})_{2}SiCl_{2}

A variety of other products are obtained, including trimethylsilyl chloride and methyltrichlorosilane. About 1 million tons of organosilicon compounds are prepared annually by this route. The method can also be used for phenyl chlorosilanes.

=== Hydrosilylation ===
Another major method for the formation of Si-C bonds is hydrosilylation (also called hydrosilation). In this process, compounds with Si–H bonds (hydrosilanes) are added to unsaturated substrates. Commercially, the main substrates are alkenes. Other unsaturated functional groups — alkynes, imines, ketones, and aldehydes — also participate, but these reactions are of little economic value.

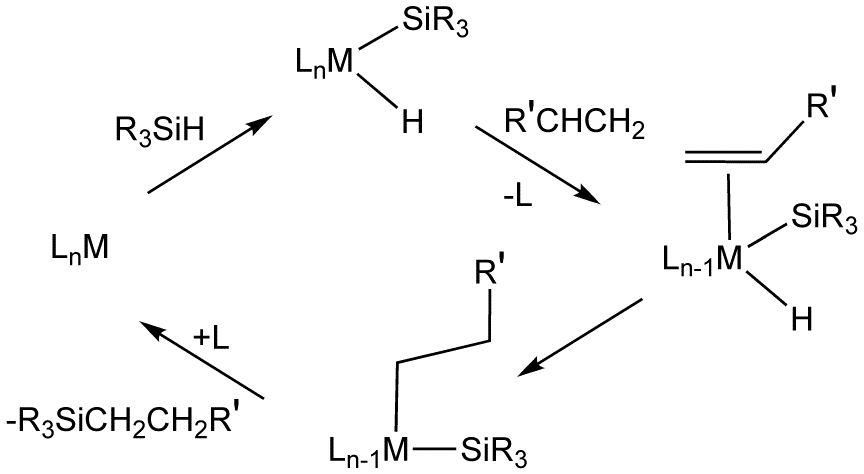
Idealized mechanism for metal-catalysed hydrosilylation of an alkene

Hydrosilylation requires metal catalysts, especially those based on platinum group metals. In the related silylmetalation, a metal replaces the hydrogen atom.

=== Via cleavage of Si–Si bonds ===
Hexamethyldisilane reacts with methyllithium to give trimethylsilyl lithium:

(CH_{3})_{6}Si_{2} + CH_{3}Li → (CH_{3})_{3}SiLi + (CH_{3})_{4}Si

Similarly, tris(trimethylsilyl)silyl lithium is derived from tetrakis(trimethylsilyl)silane:

((CH_{3})_{3}Si)_{4}Si + CH_{3}Li → ((CH_{3})_{3}Si)_{3}SiLi + (CH_{3})_{4}Si

== Functional groups ==
Silicon is a component of many functional groups. Most of these are analogous to organic compounds. The overarching exception is the rarity of multiple bonds to silicon, as reflected in the double bond rule.

=== Silanols, siloxides, siloxanes, and silazanes ===
Silanols are analogues of alcohols. They are generally prepared by hydrolysis of silyl chlorides:

R_{3}SiCl + H_{2}O → R_{3}SiOH + HCl

Less frequently silanols are prepared by oxidation of silyl hydrides, a reaction that uses a metal catalyst:

2 R_{3}SiH + O_{2} → 2 R_{3}SiOH

Many silanols have been isolated including (CH_{3})_{3}SiOH and (C_{6}H_{5})_{3}SiOH. They are about 500x more acidic than the corresponding alcohols. Siloxides are the deprotonated derivatives of silanols:

R_{3}SiOH + NaOH → R_{3}SiONa + H_{2}O

Silanols tend to dehydrate to give siloxanes:

2 R_{3}SiOH → R_{3}Si-O-SiR_{3} + H_{2}O

Polymers with repeating siloxane linkages are called silicones. Compounds with an Si=O double bond called silanones are extremely unstable.

Analogous compounds with nitrogen instead of oxygen are the silazanes.

=== Silyl ethers ===
Silyl ethers have the connectivity Si–O–C. They are typically prepared by the reaction of alcohols with silyl chlorides:

(CH_{3})_{3}SiCl + ROH → (CH_{3})_{3}Si−O−R + HCl

Silyl ethers are extensively used as protective groups for alcohols.

Exploiting the strength of the Si–F bond, fluoride sources such as tetra-n-butylammonium fluoride (TBAF) are used in deprotection of silyl ethers:

(CH_{3})_{3}Si−O−R + F^{−} + H_{2}O → (CH_{3})_{3}Si−F + H−O−R + OH^{−}

=== Silyl chlorides ===
Organosilyl chlorides are important commodity chemicals. They are mainly used to produce silicone polymers as described above. Especially important silyl chlorides dimethyldichlorosilane (Me_{2}SiCl_{2}), methyltrichlorosilane (MeSiCl_{3}), and trimethylsilyl chloride (Me_{3}SiCl) are all produced by direct process. More specialized derivatives that find commercial applications include dichloromethylphenylsilane, trichloro(chloromethyl)silane, trichloro(dichlorophenyl)silane, trichloroethylsilane, and phenyltrichlorosilane.

Although proportionately a minor outlet, organosilicon compounds are widely used in organic synthesis. Notably trimethylsilyl chloride Me_{3}SiCl is the main silylating agent. One classic method called the Flood reaction for the synthesis of this compound class is by heating hexaalkyldisiloxanes R_{3}SiOSiR_{3} with concentrated sulfuric acid and a sodium halide.

=== Silyl hydrides ===
Tris(trimethylsilyl)silane is a well-investigated hydrosilane.

The silicon to hydrogen bond is longer than the C–H bond (148 compared to 105 pm) and weaker (299 compared to 338 kJ/mol). Hydrogen is more electronegative than silicon hence the naming convention of silyl hydrides. Commonly the presence of the hydride is not mentioned in the name of the compound. Triethylsilane has the formula Et_{3}SiH. Phenylsilane is PhSiH_{3}. The parent compound SiH_{4} is called silane.

=== Silylium ions ===
Silylium ions have general formula [SiRR′R″]^{+}. They are more stable in the gas phase than the corresponding carbocations, because silicon is more electropositive than carbon. However, silicon stabilizes higher coordination numbers than carbon, such that silylium ions are much less stable and more electrophilic in condensed phases. Thus for example trimethylsilyl hydrogen sulfate is a covalent ester in sulfuric acid solution, rather than dissociated ions.

Silylium ions can be isolated with noncoordinating solvents and anions. Typically, they are synthesized via hydride abstraction from a hydrosilane.

=== Silenes ===
General formula of a Silenes

Organosilicon compounds, unlike their carbon counterparts, do not have a rich double bond chemistry. Compounds with silene Si=C bonds (also known as alkylidenesilanes) are laboratory curiosities such as the silicon benzene analogue silabenzene. In 1967, Gusel'nikov and Flowers provided the first evidence for silenes from pyrolysis of dimethylsilacyclobutane. The first stable (kinetically shielded) silene was reported in 1981 by Brook.

Disilenes have Si=Si double bonds and disilynes are silicon analogues of an alkyne. The first silyne (with a silicon to carbon triple bond) was reported in 2010.

=== Siloles ===
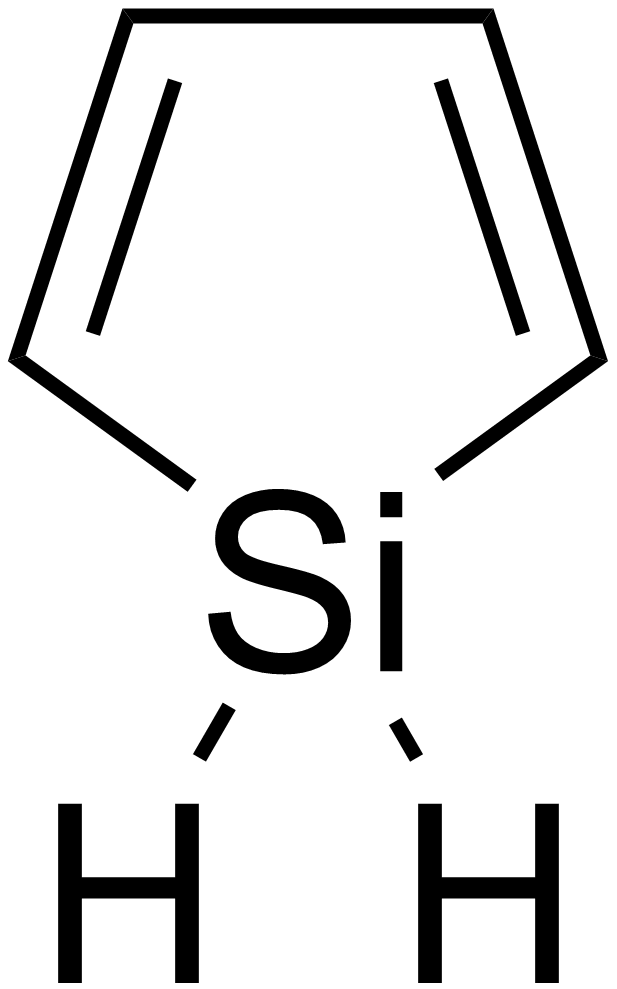
Chemical structure of silole

Siloles, also called silacyclopentadienes, are members of a larger class of compounds called metalloles. They are the silicon analogs of cyclopentadienes and are of current academic interest due to their electroluminescence and other electronic properties. Siloles are efficient in electron transport. They owe their low lying LUMO to a favorable interaction between the antibonding sigma silicon orbital with an antibonding pi orbital of the butadiene fragment.

=== Pentacoordinated silicon ===
Unlike carbon, silicon compounds can be coordinated to five atoms as well in a group of compounds ranging from so-called silatranes, such as phenylsilatrane, to a uniquely stable pentaorganosilicate:

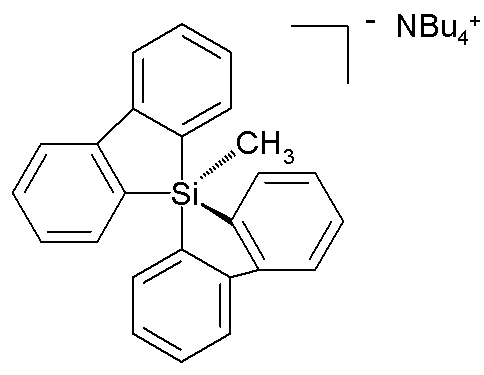

The stability of hypervalent silicon is the basis of the Hiyama coupling, a coupling reaction used in certain specialized organic synthetic applications. The reaction begins with the activation of a Si–C bond by fluoride:

R−SiR_{3}' + R"−X + F^{−} → R−R" + R'_{3}SiF + X^{−}

== Reactions of Si–C bonds ==
Unstrained silicon-carbon bonds are stable toward oxygen and water, at least under ambient conditions. Unsaturated silanes are susceptible to electrophilic substitution. Some strong acids will protodesilate arylsilanes and even some alkylsilanes. Most nucleophiles are too weak to displace carbon from silicon: the exceptions are fluoride ions and alkoxides.

"Simple tetraalkylsilanes are known to undergo random exchange of alkyls in the presence of aluminum halides."

In the Peterson olefination, an organosilicon anion attacks a carbonyl to form an alkene.

== Environmental effects ==
Organosilicon compounds affect bee (and other insect) immune expression, making them more susceptible to viral infection.

== See also ==
- Compounds of carbon with period 3 elements:
  - organoaluminum compounds
  - organophosphorus compounds
  - organosulfur compounds
- Compounds of carbon with other group 14 elements:
  - organogermanium compounds
  - organotin compounds
  - organolead compounds
- Silylenes, the carbene counterparts
- Silylenoids, the carbenoid counterparts
- Decamethylsilicocene
