= Carbenoid =

In chemistry a carbenoid is a reactive intermediate that shares reaction characteristics with a carbene. Historically, certain types of metal carbene complexes have also been described as 'carbenoids' (e.g., 'rhodium carbenoids' and 'gold carbenoids'), particularly in cases where the bonding or electronic structure is unclear. However, the contemporary trend is to refer to a transition metal complex [M]CR_{2} with metal–carbon bonding of any type as a metal carbene, while reserving the term carbenoid for a species, usually based on a main-group metal, of type M–CR_{2}–X (M = metal, X = leaving group) that behaves as a synthetic equivalent of :CR_{2}. More often than not, the free carbene is never formed when the carbenoid reacts. For example, in the Simmons–Smith reaction the carbenoid intermediate is a zinc / iodine complex that takes the form of

I–CH_{2}–Zn^{+}I^{–}

This complex reacts with an alkene to form a cyclopropane just as a carbene would do, but in a much more controlled manner and without ever forming CH_{2}. In contrast, the free carbene CH_{2} (methylene) can be generated by dediazotization of diazomethane by heat or photolysis, and it performs cyclopropanation. However, it also engages in C–H insertion and X–H insertion reactions in an indiscriminate manner, usually leading to low yields of the desired cyclopropanation product.

Carbenoids appear as intermediates in many other reactions. In one system a carbenoid chloroalkyllithium reagent is prepared in situ from a sulfoxide and t-BuLi which reacts the boronic ester to give an ate complex. The ate complex undergoes a 1,2-metallate rearrangement to give the homologated product, which is then further oxidised to a secondary alcohol.

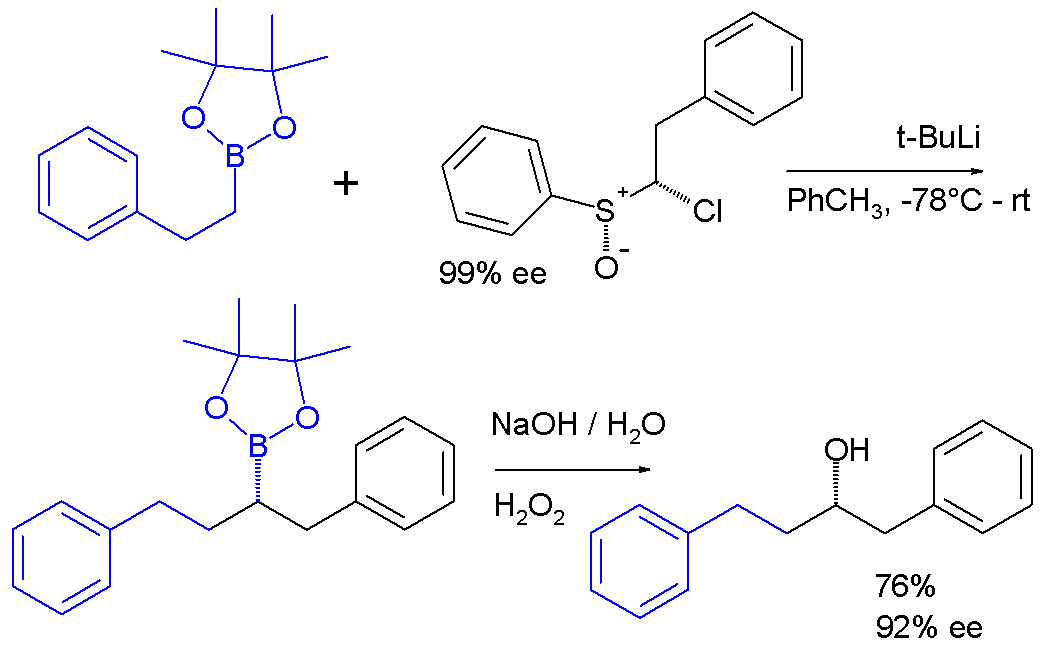

The enantiopurity of the chiral sulfoxide is preserved in the ultimate product after oxidation of the boronic ester to the alcohol indicating that a true carbene was never involved in the sequence.

== See also ==
- The silicon pendant: Silylenoids
