= Peterson olefination =

Chemical reaction

Named after	Donald John Peterson
Reaction type	Coupling reaction

Identifiers
Organic Chemistry Portal	peterson-olefination
RSC ontology ID	RXNO:0000080

The Peterson olefination (also called the Peterson reaction) is the chemical reaction of α-silyl carbanions (1 in diagram below) with ketones (or aldehydes) to form a β-hydroxysilane (2) which eliminates to form alkenes (3).

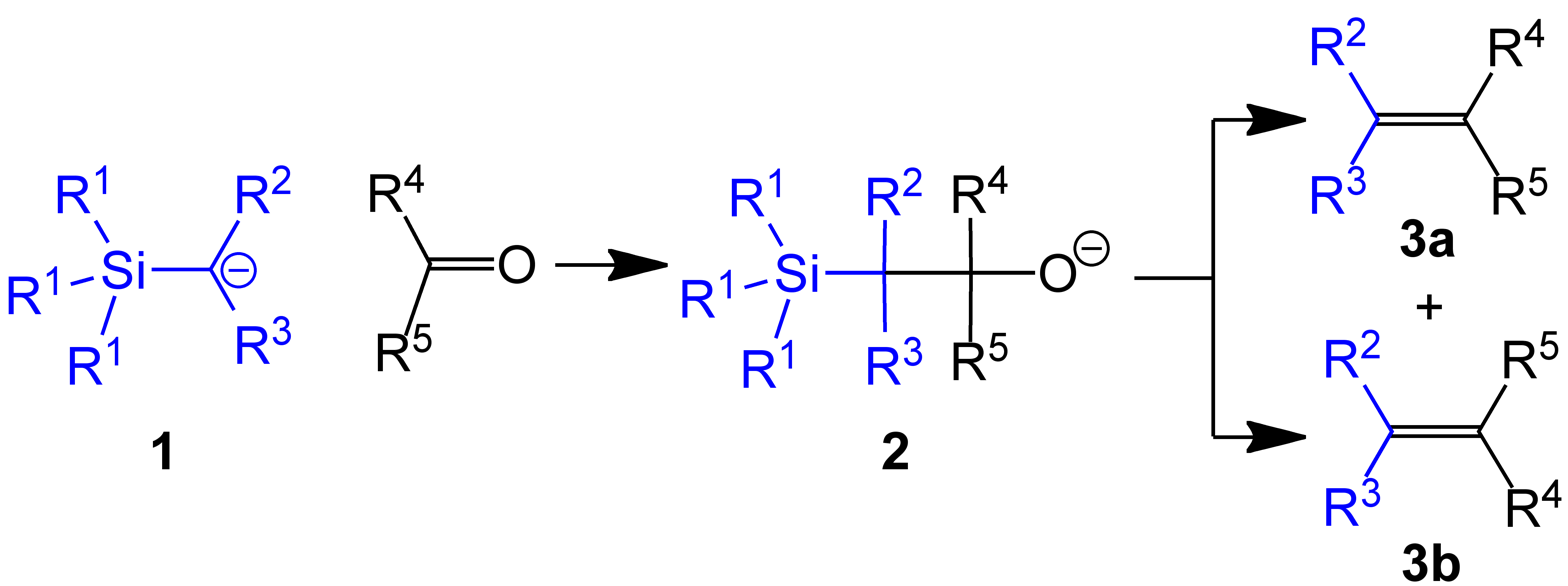

Several reviews have been published.

== Reaction mechanism ==
One attractive feature of the Peterson olefination is that it can be used to prepare either cis- or trans-alkenes from the same β-hydroxysilane. Treatment of the β-hydroxysilane with acid will yield one alkene, while treatment of the same β-hydroxysilane with base will yield the alkene of opposite stereochemistry.

=== Basic elimination ===
The action of base upon a β-hydroxysilane (1) results in a concerted syn elimination of (2) or (3) to form the desired alkene. The penta-coordinate silicate intermediate (3) is postulated, but no proof exists to date.

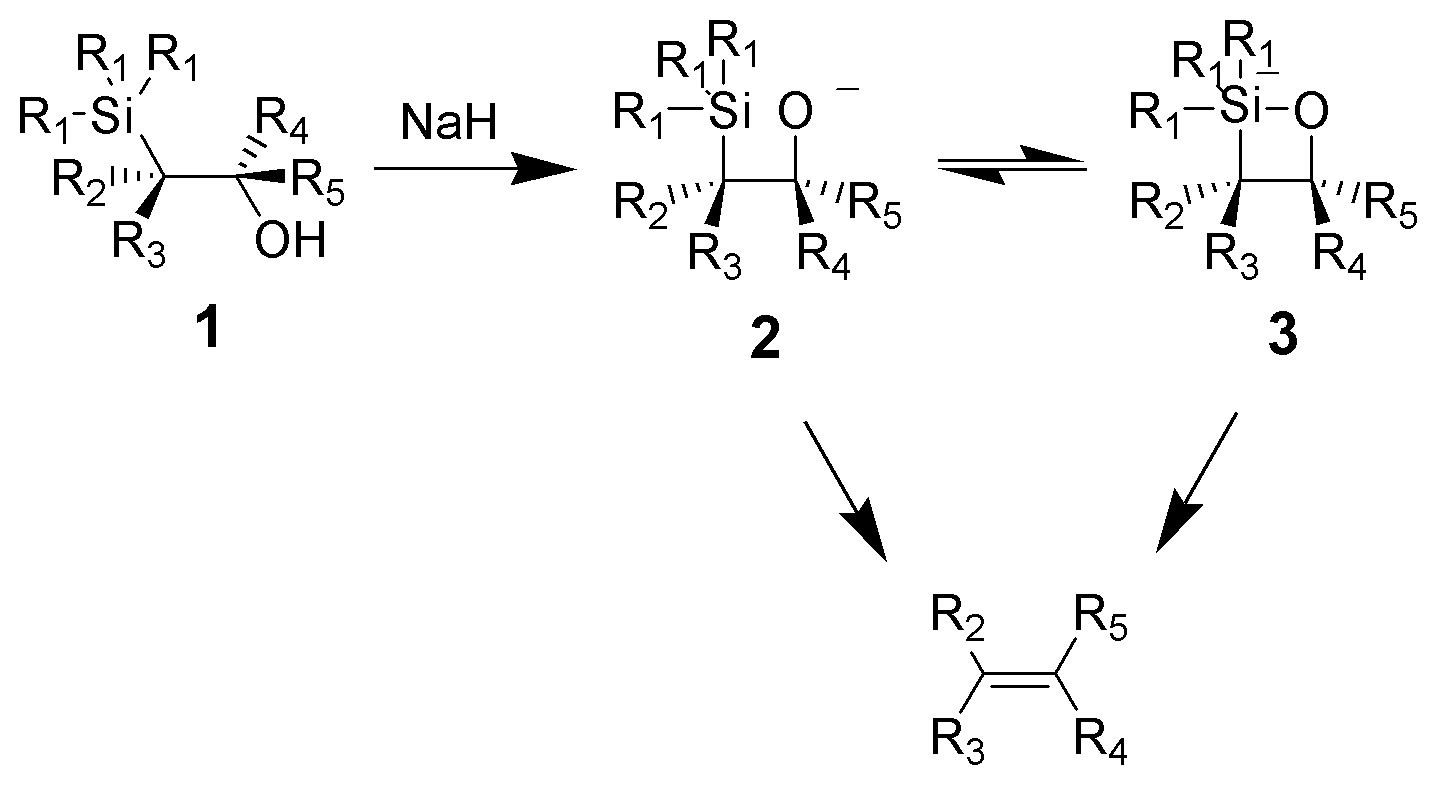
The mechanism of base-catalyzed elimination of the Peterson olefination

Potassium alkoxides eliminate quickly, while sodium alkoxides generally require heating. Magnesium alkoxides only eliminate in extreme conditions. The order of reactivity of alkoxides, K > Na >> Mg, is consistent with higher electron density on oxygen, hence increasing the alkoxide nucleophilicity.

=== Acidic elimination ===
The treatment of the β-hydroxysilane (1) with acid results in protonation and an anti elimination to form the desired alkene.

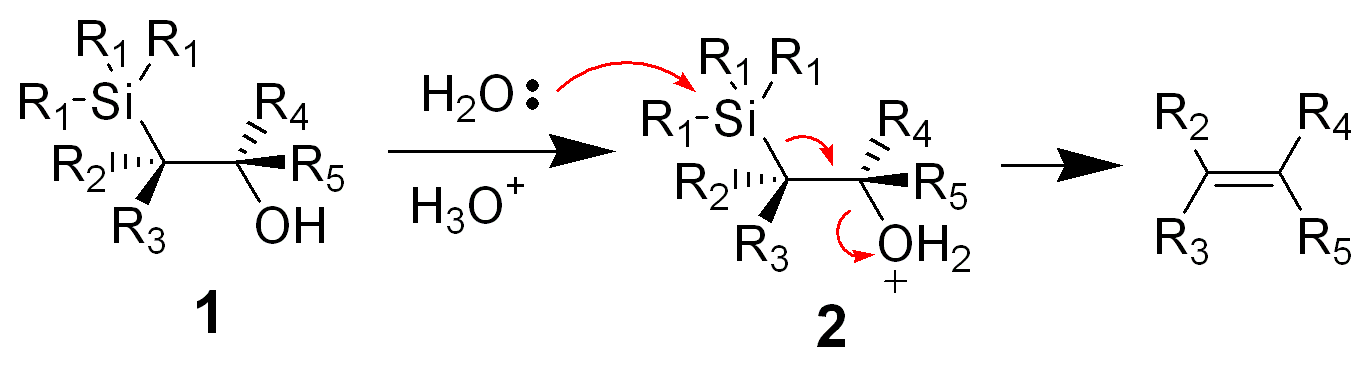
The mechanism of the acid-catalyzed elimination of the Peterson olefination

== Functional group tolerance ==
Unlike the Wittig reaction, Peterson-type olefinations tolerate nitriles.

=== Alkyl substituents ===
When the α-silyl carbanion contains only alkyl, hydrogen, or electron-donating substituents, the stereochemical outcome of the Peterson olefination can be controlled, because at low temperature the elimination is slow and the intermediate β-hydroxysilane can be isolated.

Once isolated, the diastereomeric β-hydroxysilanes are separated. One diastereomer is treated with acid, while the other is treated with base, thus converted the material to an alkene with the required stereochemistry.

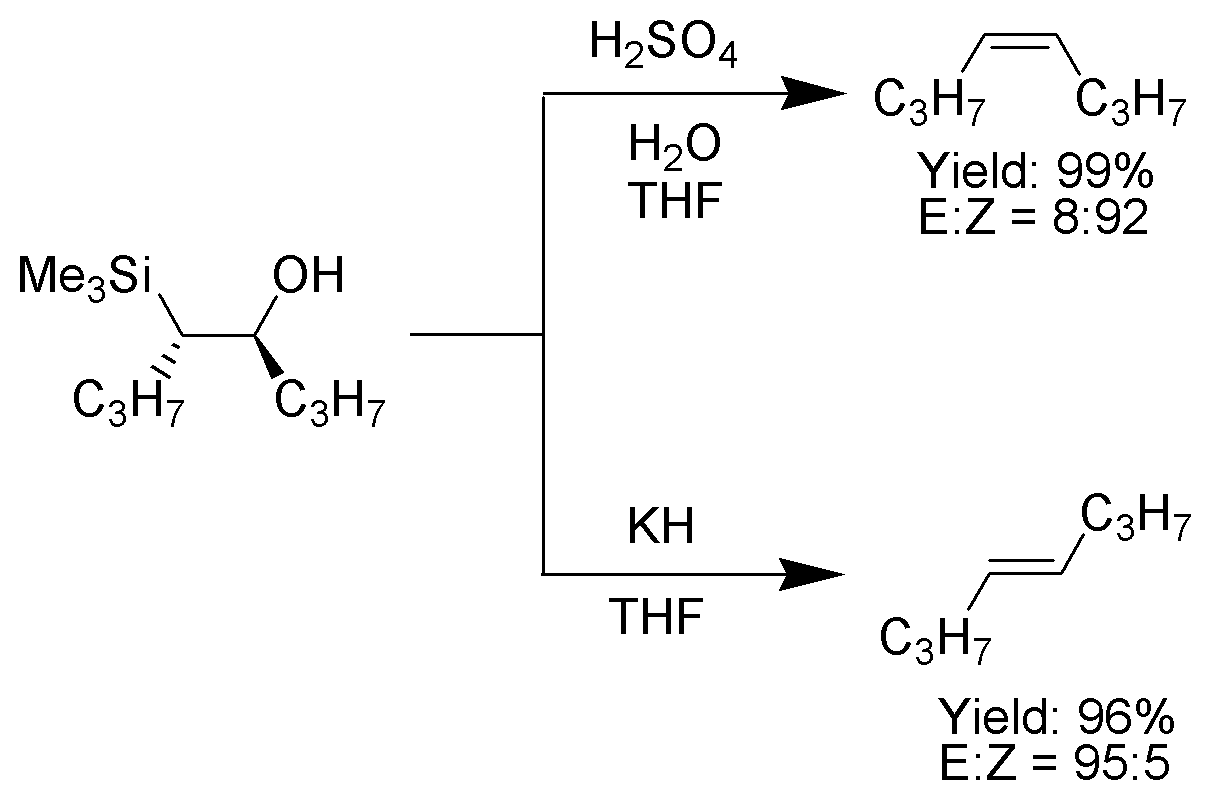
Example of the Peterson olefination

=== Electron-withdrawing substituents ===
When the α-silyl carbanion contains electron-withdrawing substituents, the Peterson olefination directly forms the alkene. The intermediate β-hydroxysilane cannot be isolated as it eliminates in-situ. The basic elimination pathway has been postulated in these cases.

== Variations ==
Acidic elimination conditions are sometimes not feasible as the acid also promotes double bond isomerization. Additionally, elimination using sodium or potassium hydride may not be feasible due to incompatible functional groups. Chan et al. have found that acylation of the intermediate silylcarbinol with either acetyl chloride or thionyl chloride gives a β-silyl ester that will eliminate spontaneously at 25 °C giving the desired alkene. Corey and co-workers developed a method (sometimes dubbed the Corey-Peterson olefination) using a silylated imine to yield an α,β-unsaturated aldehyde from a carbonyl compound in one step. For an example for its use in total synthesis see: Kuwajima Taxol total synthesis

== See also ==
- Horner–Wadsworth–Emmons reaction
- Tebbe olefination
- Wittig reaction
