= Flatbread =

Type of bread

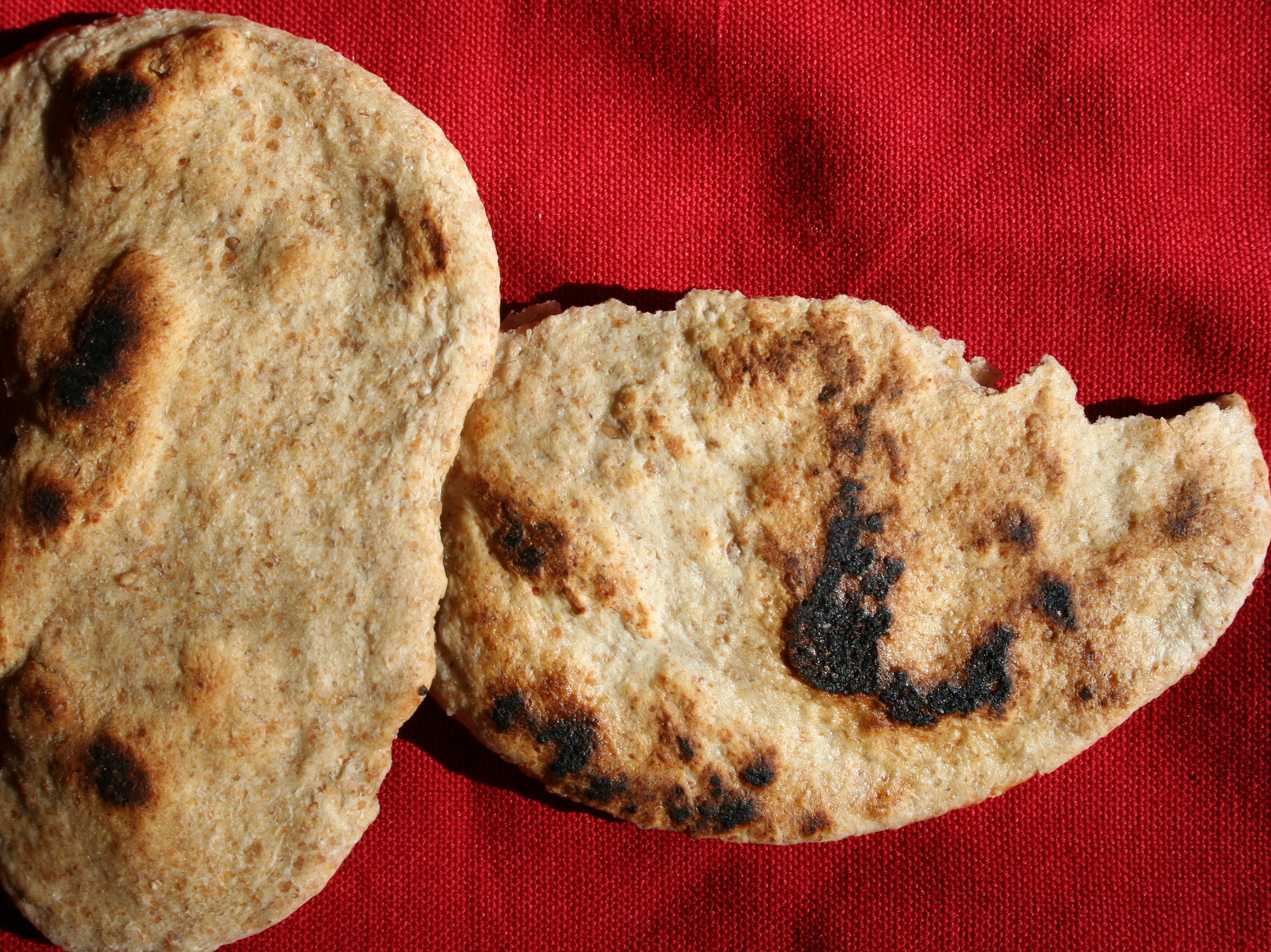
- A flatbread
- Type: Bread
- Place of origin: Many societies, including the Fertile Crescent
- Region or state: Worldwide
- Invented: Over 20,000 years ago
- Main ingredients: Flour, water, salt
- Variations: See List of flatbreads
- Similar dishes: Loaf bread, pancake, cracker

A flatbread is bread typically made with flour, water, and salt, with or without leavening, which are mixed and rolled into flattened dough. They are usually baked quickly at high temperatures and range from below one millimeter to a few centimeters in thickness. Flatbreads are distinguished from other flour-based foods such as loaf breads, which have lower proportions of crust relative to crumb; pancakes, which use liquid batter rather than firm dough; and crackers, which are dry and crisp. Flatbreads are the oldest and most common type of bread, and are often staple foods. Many types of flatbread are eaten globally.

Flatbreads may use flour from cereal grains, commonly wheat, as well as pseudocereals, pulses, or tubers. Fat may be used as shortening, while other ingredients may provide nutrition or flavor. Depending on water content, the mixture is either a dough or a batter; the latter results in a pancake-like bread. The dough is rested, during which it may undergo fermentation. Fermentation is driven by a leavening agent, most commonly sourdough. Fillings or toppings are sometimes added. Flatbreads are commonly baked against a griddle or the walls of a vertical oven (such as a tandoor). Other methods include being baked in domed ovens, covered in embers, or fried in oil. Some flatbreads puff up as steam forms while baking, while others are pressed or stamped to avoid this. Flatbreads are divided into double-layered flatbreads, which contain leavening and puff up while baking, and single-layered flatbreads, which include thick, leavened varieties and thin, unleavened varieties.

Flatbreads are typically pliable but quickly become stale, so they are usually eaten fresh. They can accompany other foods to act as a utensil or serving plate, or they can be wrapped around foods to form a dish such as a wrap. Some types are dried to be stored long-term. Flatbreads are high in calories, carbohydrates, and protein. Flatbread is commonly made by rural households and urban bakeries, while mass-produced versions include frozen and ready-to-eat products.

Flatbreads were one of the earliest processed foods, being common in many societies by the Neolithic period, with archaeological findings dating back over 14,000 years. Early versions were made of non-cereal starches. Flatbreads spread to many regions from the Fertile Crescent, where wheat and barley were first domesticated. The Greco-Roman world and later European cultures preferred loaf breads over flatbreads. In the modern era, industrial production has become common amid societal changes like urbanization.

Wheat flatbreads are widespread in North African, Middle Eastern, Caucasian, Central Asian, and South Asian cuisines. Tandoor-baked flatbreads are eaten across these regions. Maize-based flatbreads are common in Latin American cuisine, while various local grains are used for dried flatbreads in Northern European cuisine or pancake-like breads in Northeast African cuisine. Some flatbreads, such as pizza, are consumed worldwide.

== Characteristics ==
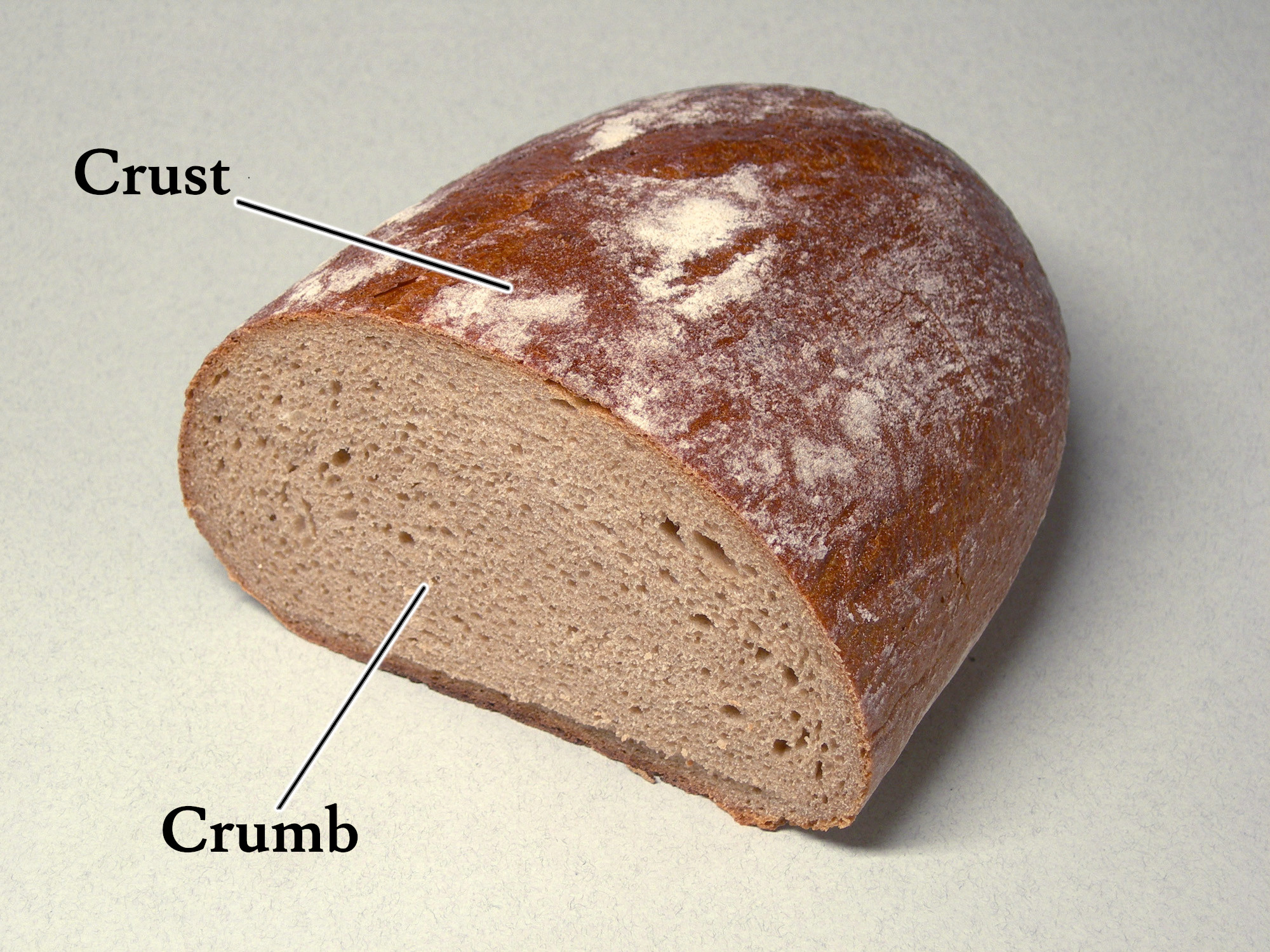
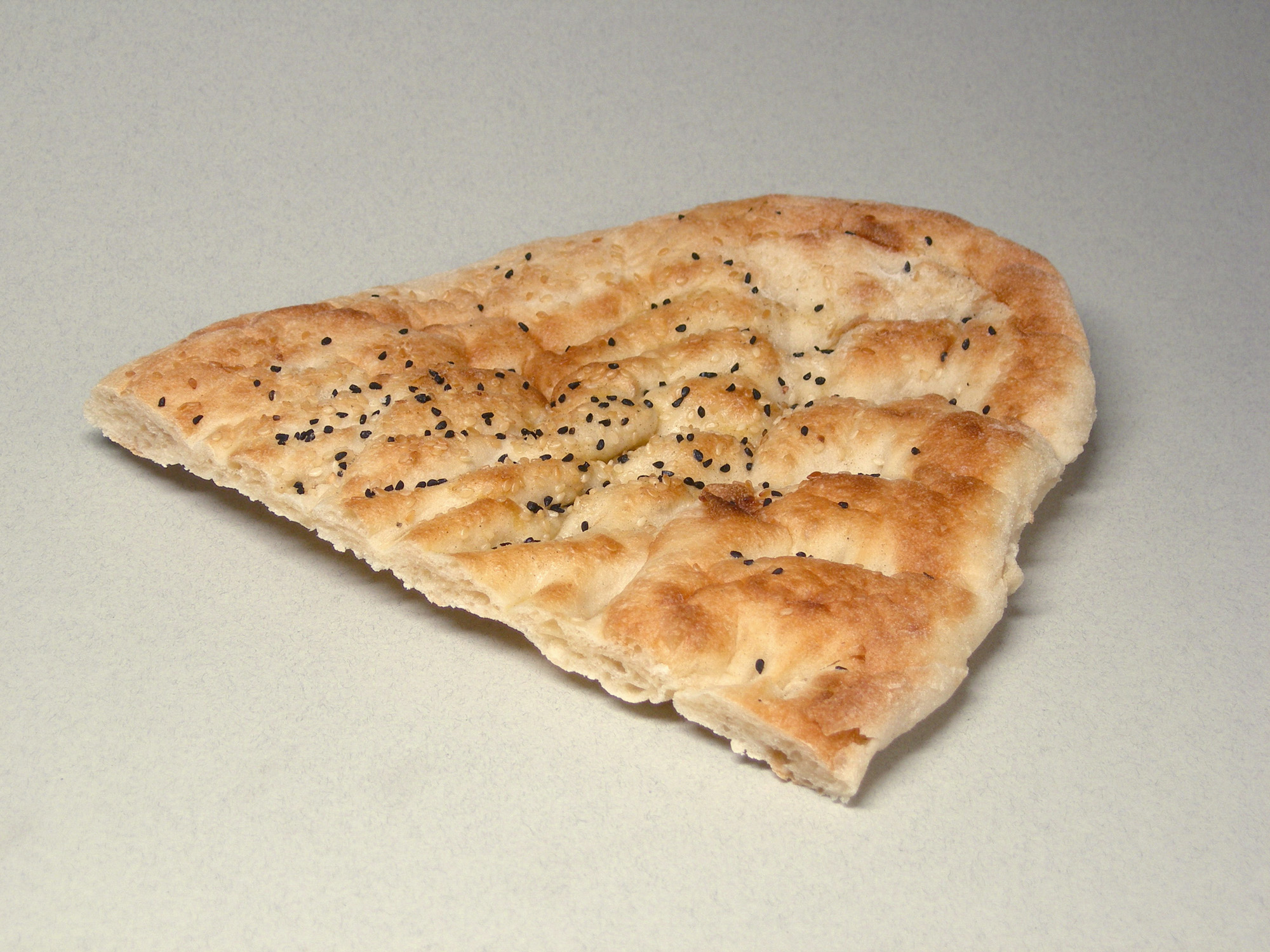
Compared to a loaf bread (left), a flatbread (right) has less crumb relative to its crust.

Flatbreads are a very diverse category of breads characterized by being flat. (Note: The word flatbread is attested by 1762, possibly as a calque of the German word, Fladenbrot.) They are distinguished from loaf breads as flatbreads have higher density and a higher proportion of crust relative to crumb. Some, such as tortillas, essentially have no crumb. Pancakes may be considered a type of flatbread or a distinct category. Flatbreads and pancakes use the same ingredients of flour and water, which are turned into a fluid batter for pancakes or a firm dough for flatbreads. Crackers are similar to flatbreads but with less water, (Note: To separate them from crackers or biscuits, agriculturist K. J. Quail defines flatbreads as containing greater than 20% moisture, which includes the most common flatbreads but excludes some such as crispbread.) making them crisp. Although they are related to several types of flatbreads, crackers are considered a separate category.

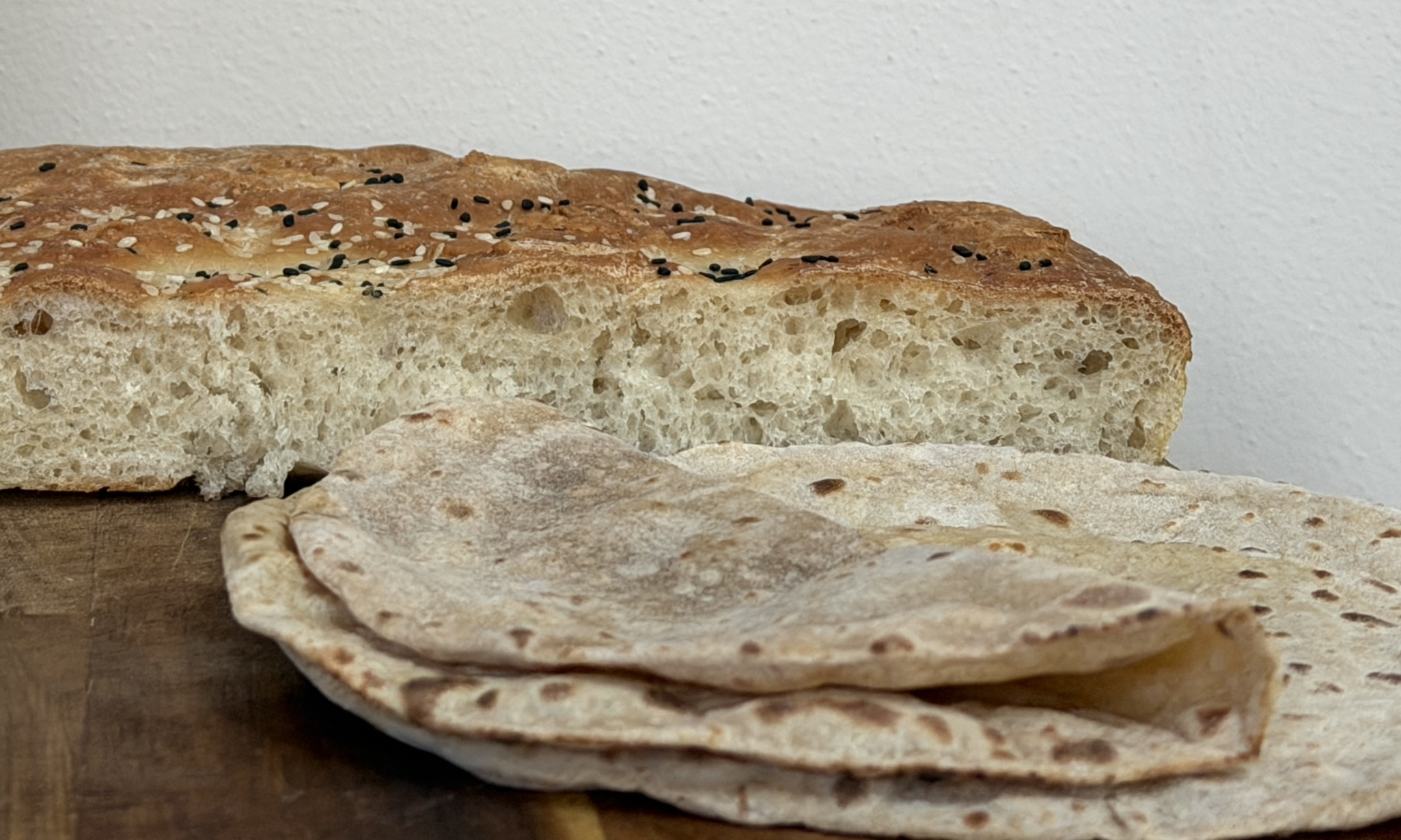
Flatbreads vary in size and shape, such as this thick focaccia and thin chapati.

There are many types of flatbreads, which vary based on ingredients, baking methods, size, shape, and moisture. Some are paper-thin and translucent, while others are a few centimeters thick, bordering on loaf breads and able to be sliced. They may weigh between 20 grams and 1 kilogram, with a diameter between 5 and 70 centimeters. Most are round, but some are triangular or rectangular. In appearance, they are light with dark spots. Some types have fillings or toppings, such as pizza. According to food scientist Jalal Qarooni, flatbreads are possibly the most diverse and most popular type of food product.

Though some qualities of flatbreads are variable or subjective, pliability is important for almost all types so that they can be rolled or folded around food. Flatbreads lose this texture if they become stale, to a much greater extent than loaf breads, so they are eaten fresh. Most flatbreads have a very low shelf life as they only have a few basic ingredients, becoming stale after a few hours at room temperature. In flatbreads, like other breads, staling is accompanied by moisture loss, starch retrogradation, and hardening. They may also grow mold as they contain moisture. Their low shelf life contributes to food waste. They are often frozen to last longer, and can be reheated with little difference in quality.

Flatbreads are nutritionally similar to other breads. They are a significant source of energy and nutrients such as protein. Their protein content is about 12%, almost entirely from the flour. They are also high in carbohydrates as they have starchy ingredients; the average fiber content is about 3%, while the sugar content is low, with no more than 5 g per serving. Fat content varies depending on the use of oil. They contain vitamins such as thiamine, riboflavin, and niacin. They often contain phytic acid, an antinutrient that acts against mineral value.

== Ingredients ==
The basic ingredients of flatbreads, like other baked goods, are flour, water, and salt, with optional ingredients including fat and yeast. Water is necessary to form a homogenous dough. Flatbreads usually have less water than loaf breads, but the amount varies. A soft, light flatbread can be made with 50% water (relative to flour), while some types contain 60–75%. This proportion is subjective and may vary based on the flour's ability to absorb it. If the flour contains gluten, water helps its development. Salt is necessary for a good-quality product as it strengthens flour and improves texture. The salt content is typically 0.5–3% of the flour, though salt is sometimes excluded from varieties like chapati or maize tortillas. Fat or oil is used as shortening. It increases shelf life, eases dough handling, and makes the bread softer. Examples of shortening include lard in wheat tortillas and butter in naan.

=== Flour ===
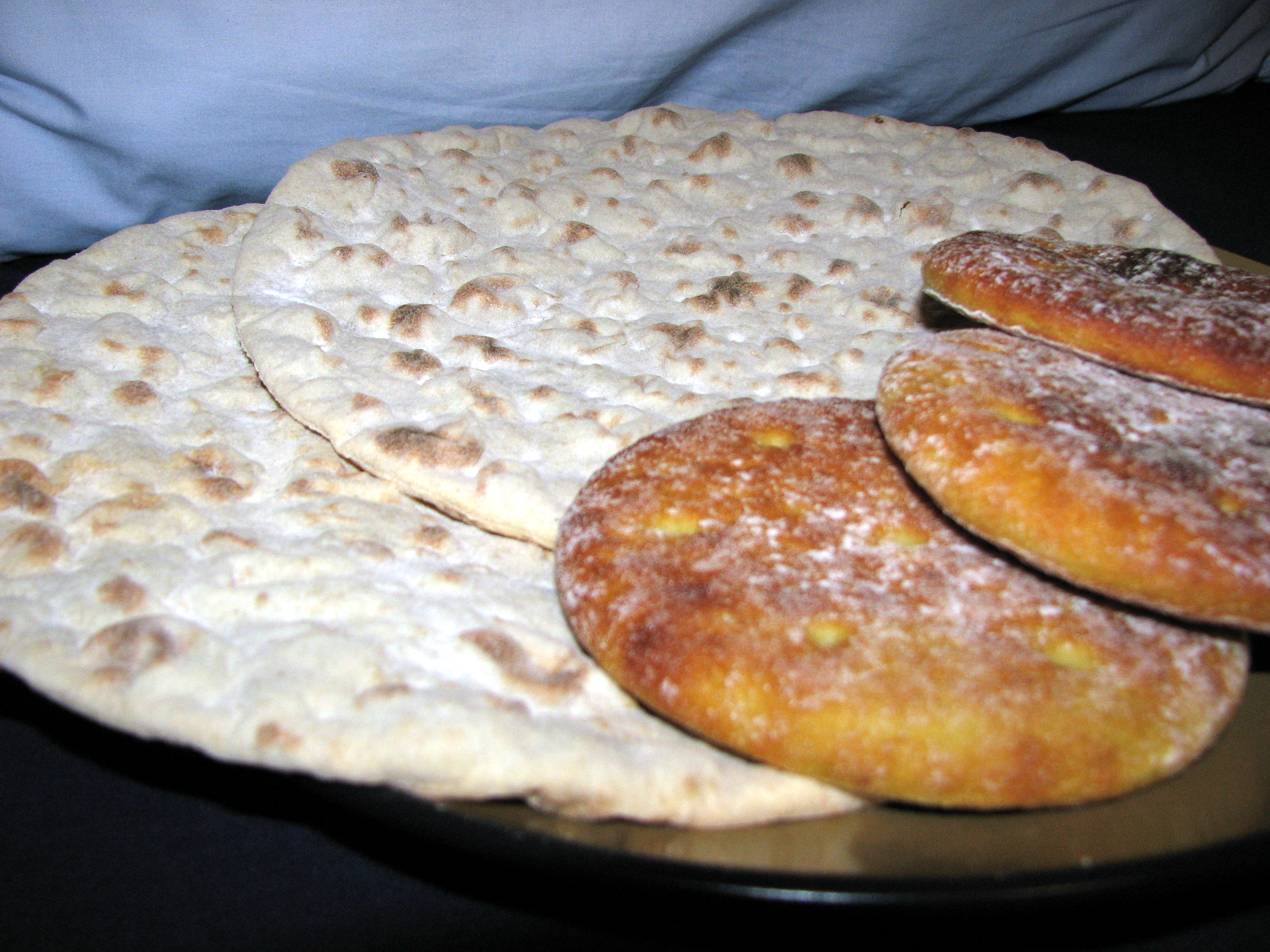
Flatbreads made of rye (left) and potato flour (right)

Flatbreads can use flour from various cereal grains, pseudocereals, or pulses. This differs from loaf breads, which are generally made only of wheat flour, because flatbreads do not require gluten. Gluten is necessary for viscoelastic doughs, so these are usually made of wheat, but thin batters can use gluten-free flours. Flour is sometimes prepared the same day it is baked; this is common among rural residents of North India including Rajasthan.

Wheat flatbreads are the predominant type in many regions. They mostly use soft wheat varieties, but others such as durum are used depending on regional availability. Other cereal grains used for flatbreads include maize flour and rice flour. Minor cereals such as barley, millets, sorghum, oats, and rye are used in various regions. Most flatbreads, such as chapati, use whole grains, while others use refined grains. Some are multigrain. Pseudocereals used for flatbreads include teff. Flatbreads can also be made of pulses such as chickpeas, field peas, or fava beans, each with very different flavors. Pulse flatbreads were historically common when grains were expensive. Pulse flours may be mixed with rice or maize flour. Tubers such as potatoes are also used.

Qualities of wheat flatbreads are influenced by flour processing, milling (which affects flour extraction and damaged starch content), and properties of the wheat itself. Flour germ and bran make dough less elastic, which strongly influences rolling and, in turn, the final product. Thus, wheat flatbreads usually use high-extraction flour (75–90% extraction), (Note: A few flatbreads, such as crispbread, use flour of extraction above 90%.) which has higher germ and bran content. Low-extraction flour is used for varieties that contain shortening, which achieves a similar role. (Note: Flatbreads made of low-extraction flour include paratha, puri, and wheat tortillas.) Other qualities of wheat flour correlated with improved flatbread include hardness, gluten strength, water absorption, and damaged starch content. For various flatbreads, the ideal level of water absorption ranges from 38% to 85%. For yeast-leavened flatbreads, higher absorption is ideal as it results in more gas formation. Factors correlated with water absorption include damaged starch content and flour protein content. Protein content is higher in whole grains than refined grains. In wheat flatbreads, the flour typically contains between 9.5% and 12.5% protein, ideally with a high proportion of gliadin relative to glutenin. The strength of gluten is less important than it is for loaf breads as the smaller crumb means less gas formation.

Compared to wheat, minor cereals are higher in fiber, so they may result in more nutritional value but less water absorption and dough stability. Maize flatbreads are high in carbohydrates but low in protein and micronutrients. Sorghum flatbreads contain antinutrients that make starch and protein less digestible. Teff flatbreads are high in fiber and minerals. Combining multiple flours can influence properties due to interactions between different proteins. Adding pulse flours increases fiber and protein, including globulin, which may improve texture. Flour is sometimes fortified with minerals or other nutrients.

=== Additional ingredients ===
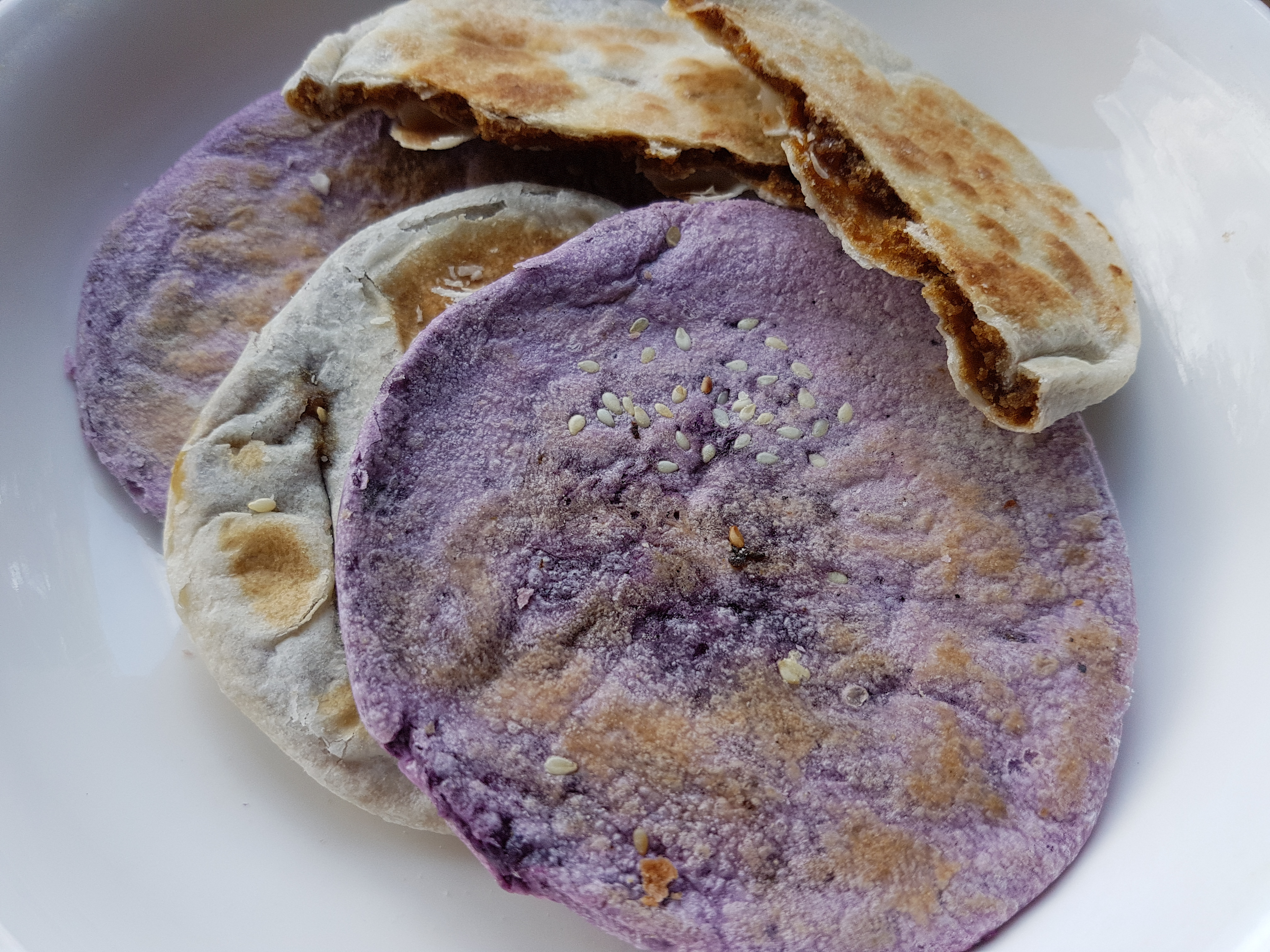
Flatbread ingredients may include fruits or seeds.

Additional ingredients are used for flavor, nutrition, or other properties. Sweet flatbreads use sugar or honey for flavor. Salty flatbreads use salt for flavor, though a little sugar may be used for yeast growth. In addition, sweet flatbreads sometimes use fruits, while salty flatbreads sometimes use vegetables or spices. Seeds can be placed on the surface of dough, such as sesame seeds on shaobing.

Flatbread ingredients include both plant and animal products. Animal products such as milk, butter, yogurt, whey, or eggs are used for nutrition and texture. Their high protein content contributes to dough stability. Whey is a common source of protein fortification, especially in gluten-free flatbreads. Eggs increase protein and micronutrients and also act as a leavening agent. Aside from flour, plant-based products include extracted starch, protein, and fiber. Plant starches are added for texture and appearance, especially in gluten-free flatbreads. Plant proteins, mostly gluten, improve texture when the flour used is not optimal. Fibers also improve texture as they increase water absorption. Flours made of vegetables, fruits, or seeds can be used for nutrition and other properties.

Ingredients can vary according to dietary needs, such as vegan or gluten-free diets. Gluten-free flatbreads are more complete vitamin sources than other gluten-free breads. To increase nutritional value, vegetables may be added, or sprouted flours may be used. In industrial production, flatbreads may include additives that improve the dough, including emulsifiers (Note: The amount of emulsifiers in flatbreads is much less than in loaf breads as they can make the bread too soft to hold together.) or hydrocolloids such as guar gum. Other additives include preservatives and thickeners. Flatbreads are less impacted by added ingredients than loaf breads, though some ingredients may make the dough overly sticky or unable to hold steam.

== Process ==
Flatbreads, like other breads, are made by mixing ingredients, shaping, and baking. The ingredients are mixed into either a firm dough, using more flour than water, or a thin batter, using more water. The processing of dough into flatbread takes between 45 minutes and 3 hours. The timing of each step has a significant influence on the final product.

=== Mixing and shaping ===
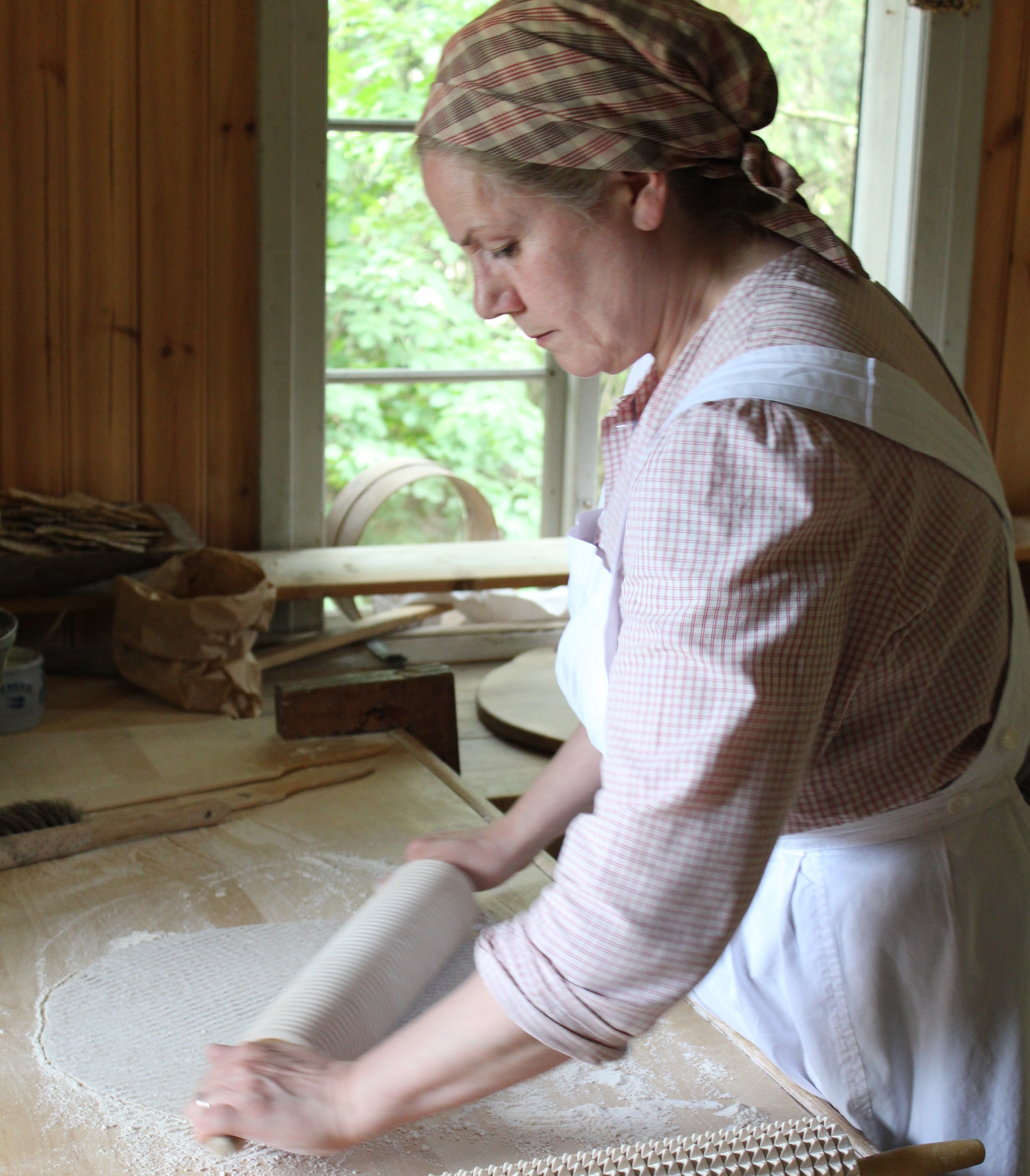
Dough is rolled with a rolling pin.

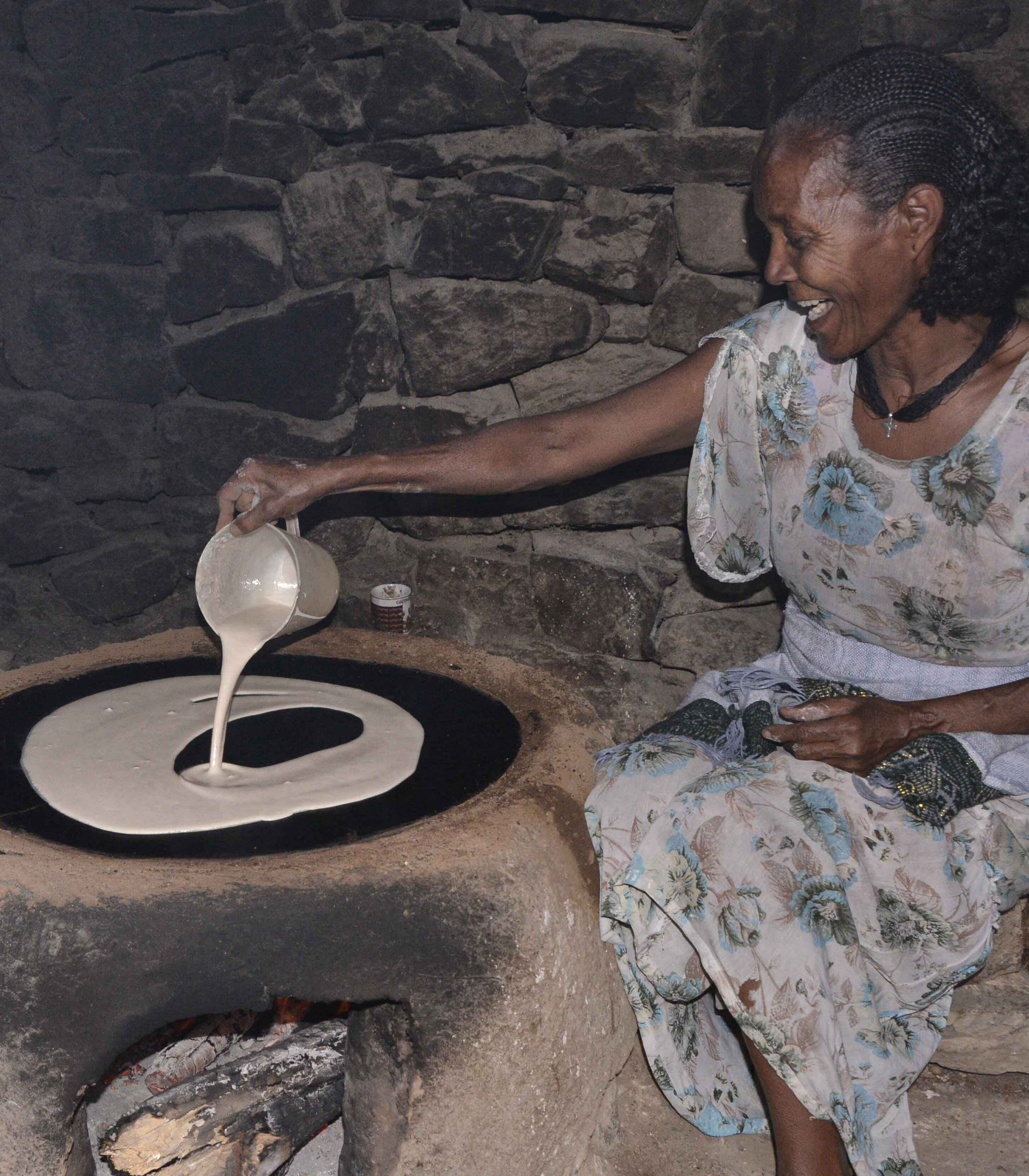
Batter is poured.

Some doughs are mixed by kneading, which incorporates air and develops gluten. This contributes to the light texture of flatbreads like chapati or tortillas, and it ensures evenly mixed dough for thicker flatbreads like focaccia or naan. Other doughs are mixed without kneading as they do not need gluten development. Small-scale bakeries mix the dough by hand, which takes about 25–50 minutes, though electric mixers are also common.

A flatbread is strongly impacted by the dough's rheological properties, including consistency, which is influenced by water content; spreadability, which is influenced by water content and kneading time; stickiness, which is influenced by flour properties; and hardness, which is influenced by all of these factors as well as oil use. Compared to other breads, flatbreads are not as sensitive to being mixed too much or too little; they are sometimes intentionally overmixed if the flour is too strong. The ideal dough properties enable it to be rolled out easily.

Doughs using non-wheat flours may require additional processing steps to ensure cohesiveness, though this is less of a problem for flatbreads than loaf breads. Maize flour may be soaked in limewater, a process known as nixtamalization. The resulting dough, known as masa, is comparable to a wheat dough, and it is used to make tortillas. Another method is pregelatinization, in which a portion of the dough is pre-cooked. This is used for flatbreads including the teff-based injera and pearl millet-based rotla.

To shape flatbreads, dough is rounded and flattened with a rolling pin, or batter is poured onto the baking surface. The portions are about 30–50 grams. Dough is rolled out to an even thickness to ensure even cooking.

=== Fermentation or resting ===
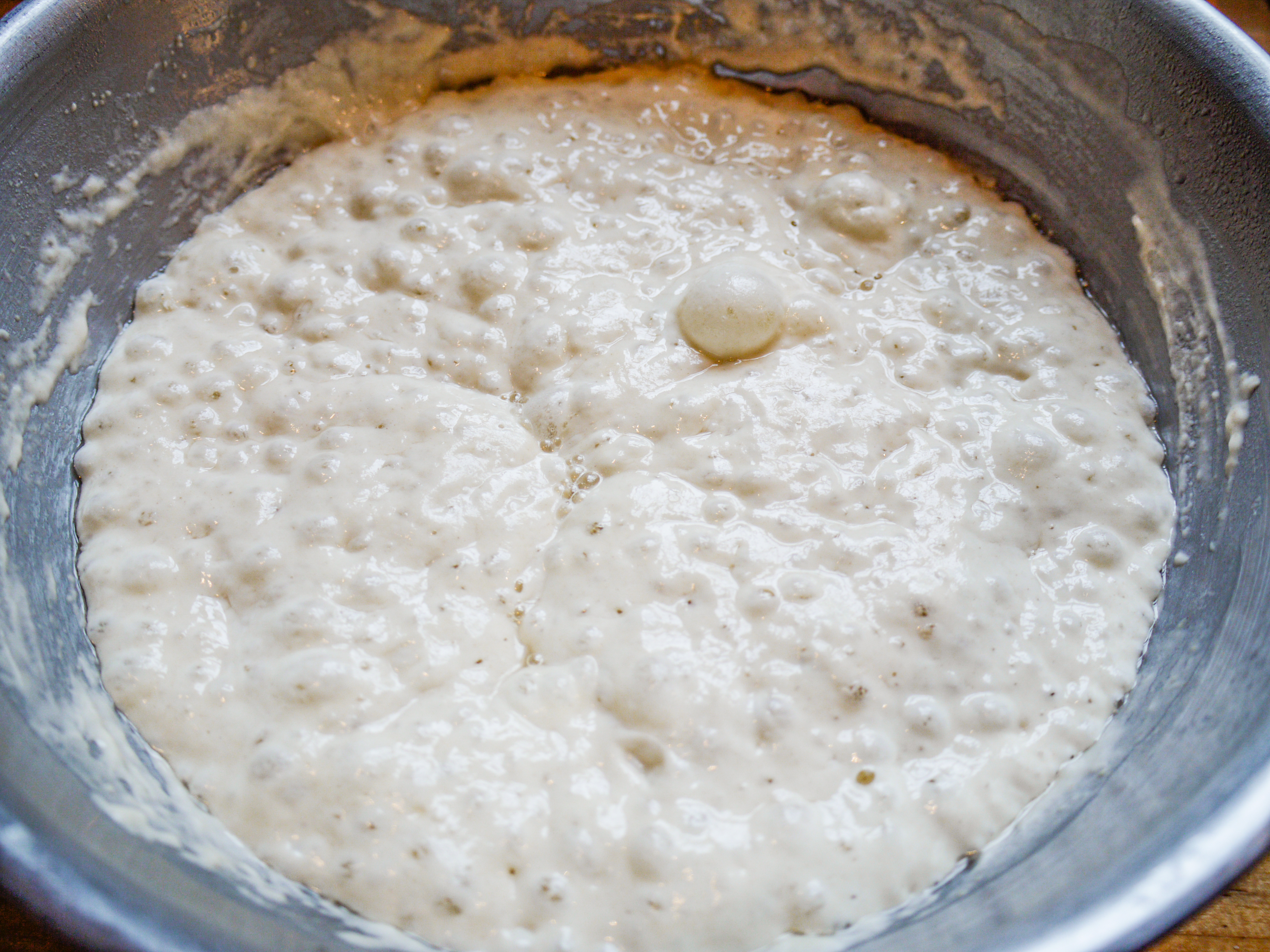
A portion of dough used for the sourdough leavening of focaccia

Flatbreads are optionally leavened, meaning that gaseous carbon dioxide forms and expands the dough as a result of fermentation driven by microorganisms or a chemical agent. Like loaf breads, flatbreads are leavened with either sourdough or baker's yeast. They require a lower fermentation time than loaf breads. They are fermented before shaping, experiencing little to no proofing between shaping and baking. Even unleavened flatbreads are rested for 30–90 minutes to enable water absorption. Resting develops gluten or other proteins, (Note: In maize doughs, the protein developed is zein.) making it easier to work the dough.

Sourdough involves fermenting a portion of dough, commonly saved from a previous batch, causing the formation of yeasts and lactic acid bacteria. This is used for the majority of flatbreads, including injera and baladi. Baker's yeast produces less flavor than sourdough but is popular for its convenience. Some flatbreads historically made of sourdough have been overtaken by yeast versions. Flatbreads using chemical leavening, such as sodium bicarbonate, also exist. Sodium bicarbonate is particularly popular in Pakistan, Iran, and Iraq, and is used for its ease, inexpensiveness, and low influence on taste.

=== Baking ===
==== Baking process ====
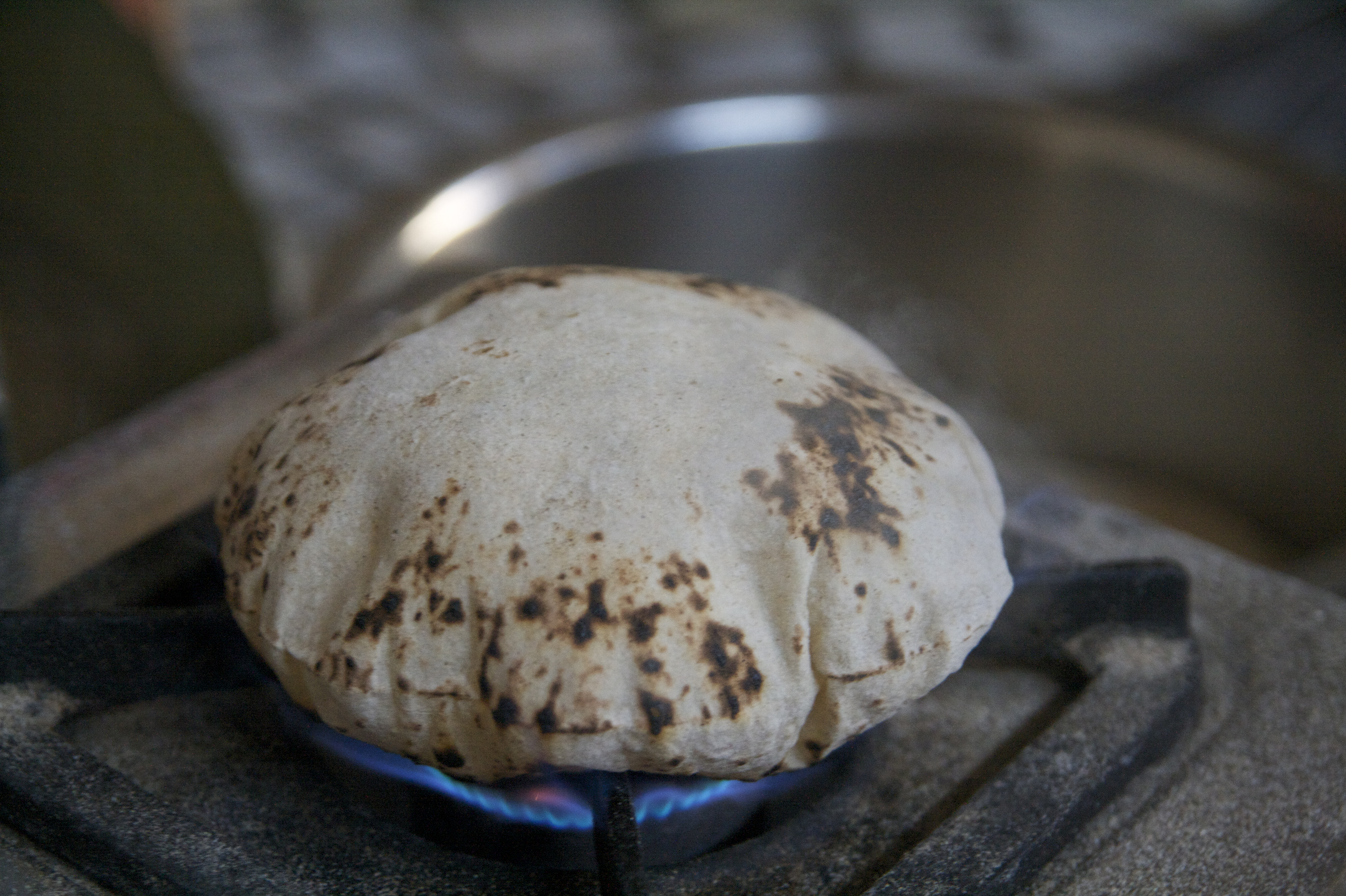
Chapati undergoing steam leavening

Flatbreads may be made with any baking method. They bake in a few minutes at high heat of about 300–600°C (572–1112°F). (Note: For example, pizza may be baked in a pizza oven at 450°C (900°F).) This is hotter and faster than loaf breads due to lower volume, so flatbreads can be made with less fuel. Typically, only one or two flatbreads are baked at once, whereas loaf breads can more efficiently be baked with many in a single oven.

While baking, dough expands, loses moisture, and, if it is leavened, forms gas bubbles. Heat causes starch to gelatinize and protein to denature. The structure of the final product consists of gelatinized starch surrounded by a continuous matrix of denatured protein. The crust forms while baking, with distinct granules of starch. The higher the baking temperature, the crustier the flatbread. The Maillard reaction and caramelization change the color of dough.

Though some do not contain leavening agents, all flatbreads experience some degree of expansion from steam and air. (Note: Using a broad definition of leavening, to encompass expansion caused by any substance, all flatbreads experience it.) If steam forms quickly enough, it alone can cause dough to rise. Steam leavening requires a surface temperature of at least 400°C (752°F), achieved by embers or a very hot oven, so it does not occur in most baked goods. Some flatbreads such as chapati expand only from steam, while some are leavened by both steam and fermentation. They temporarily inflate to a high volume as steam accumulates in the weak inner layer, pushing the outer layers. Other types are punched to avoid such expansion, such as matzah, which has holes pierced through it with a fork or comb.

==== Baking methods ====
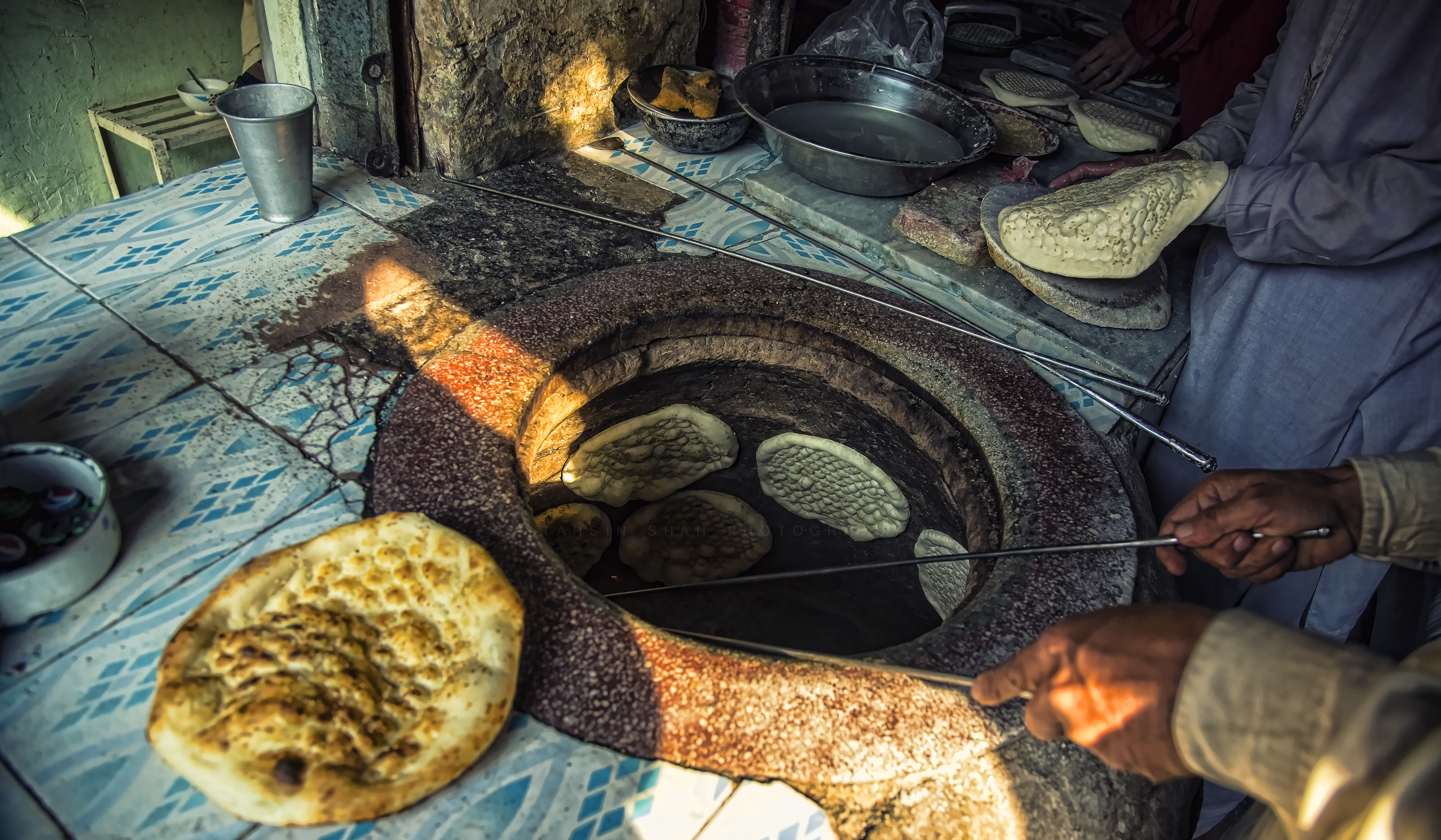
Tandoor bread baking in a tandoor, being removed with tongs

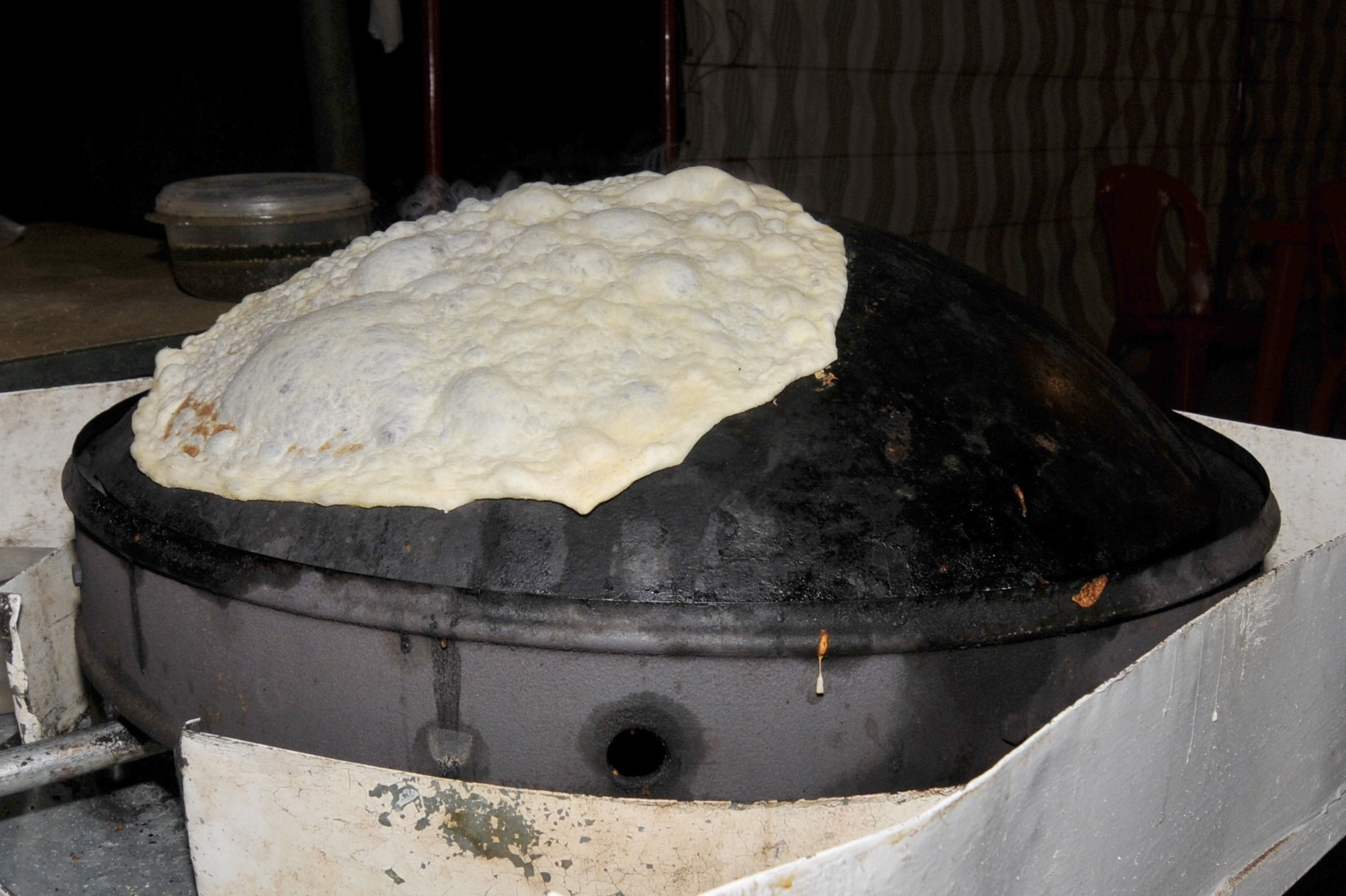
Saj bread baking on a griddle

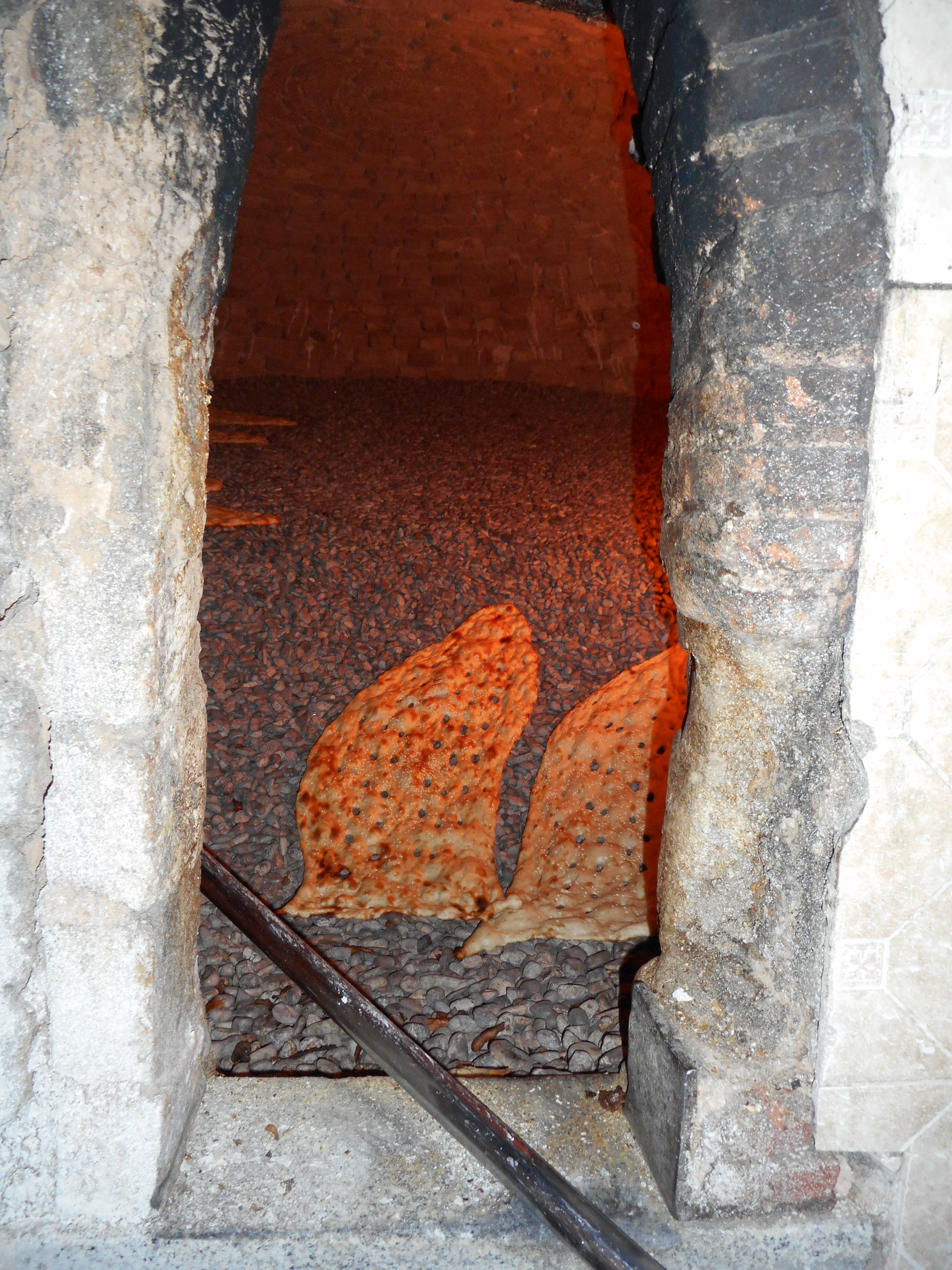
Sangak baking in a domed oven

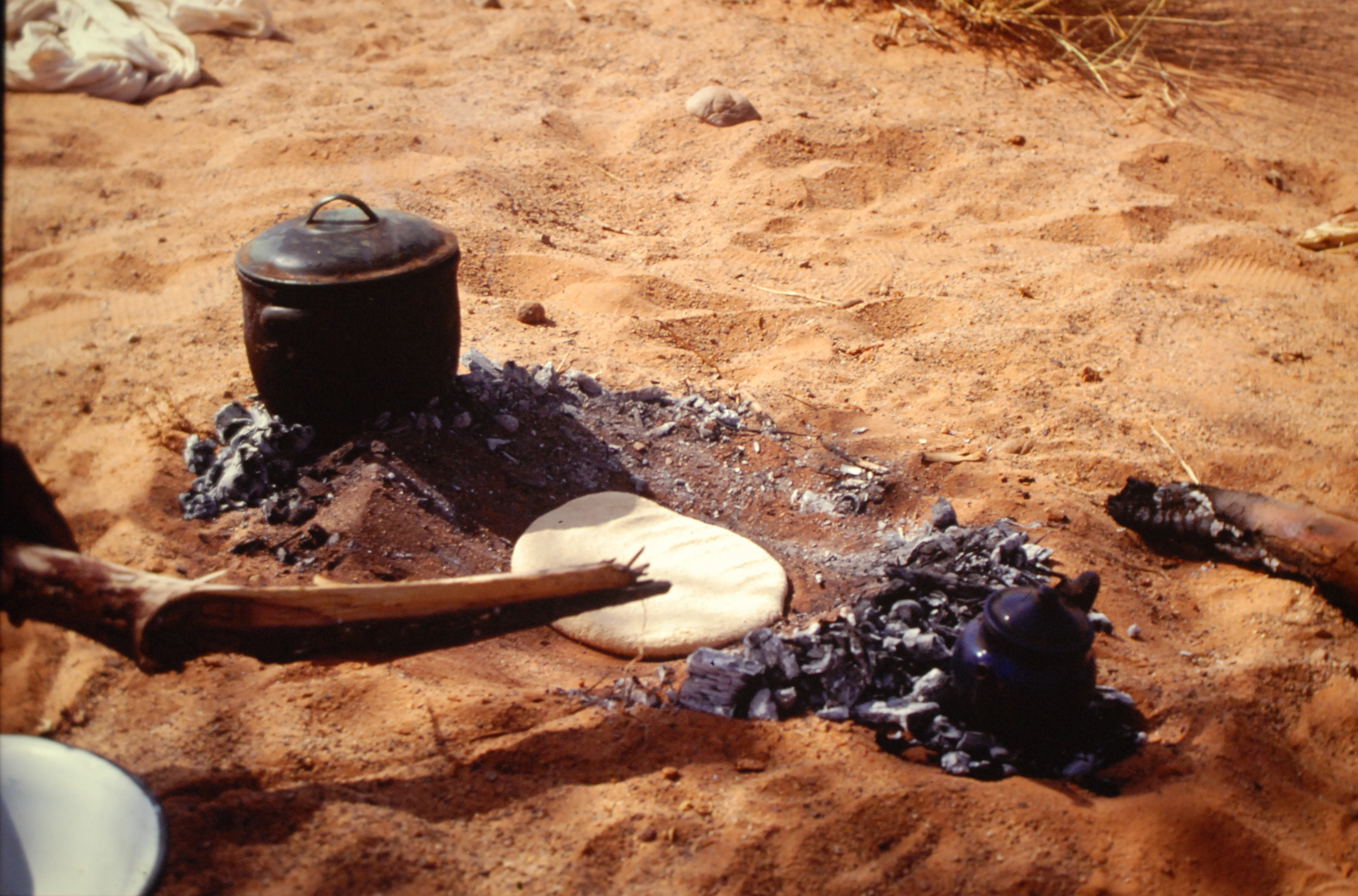
Pain de sable baking in embers

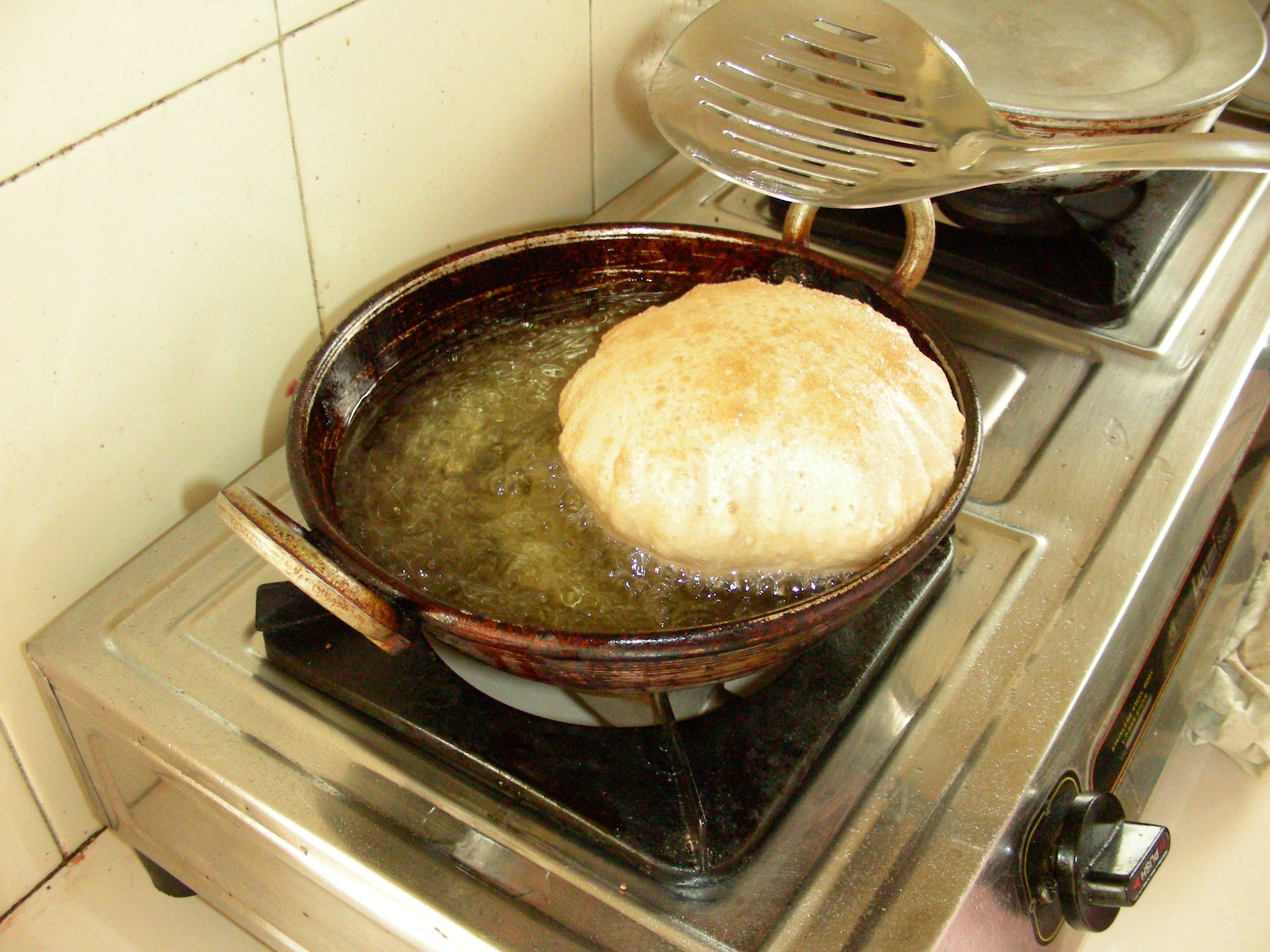
Puri being deep fried

The simplest way to bake flatbread is to place it directly on embers. Ember-baked flatbreads can vary in size, thickness, texture, and flavor, and many inflate while baking. The dough does not burn or get ashes stuck to it, resulting in a product comparable to wood-fired flatbreads. Baking in embers occurs in communities that are either nomadic or very poor; for example, some North African nomadic communities produce flatbreads known as pain de sable using embers in sand.

Rather than baking dough directly on embers, it may be placed on a griddle that is heated on embers. Heating griddles over gas flames is also common. An iron griddle, such as a tava or saj, is usually used, though clay griddles also exist, such as the mitad of the Horn of Africa. Flatbreads baked on griddles sometimes have yeast, but are more commonly chemically leavened or unleavened. They may be very thin—being sheeted against the griddle—or very thick. Cooking flatbreads on the convex side of a large griddle is common in many regions. Griddle-baked flatbreads include chapati and saj bread.

One of the most common baking methods is a vertical oven such as the tandoor or, less commonly, the Middle Eastern tabun. The oven has an opening at the top, and dough is baked on the walls of the oven. The dough is quickly stuck to the wall, often with water to help it stick. It may be placed by hand or, in the case of particularly large and thin flatbreads, using a cushion. A flatbread cooks quickly in this type of oven and is removed using metal tongs. The bottom of the bread forms a dark crust due to heat conduction from the walls, while the top is cooked by air convection. Tandoor breads comprise several regional variants, using the same method.

Domed ovens, which are used for loaf bread, are also used for flatbread, but less commonly than vertical ovens or griddles. Flatbreads such as sangak are baked in a domed oven with a layer of pebbles on the bottom, avoiding contact with the ground and creating a rough texture.

Rather than being baked, some flatbreads are fried or steamed. They may be shallow-fried, such as paratha, or deep-fried, such as puri. Fried flatbreads are high in fat and have unique sensory qualities.

== Classification ==
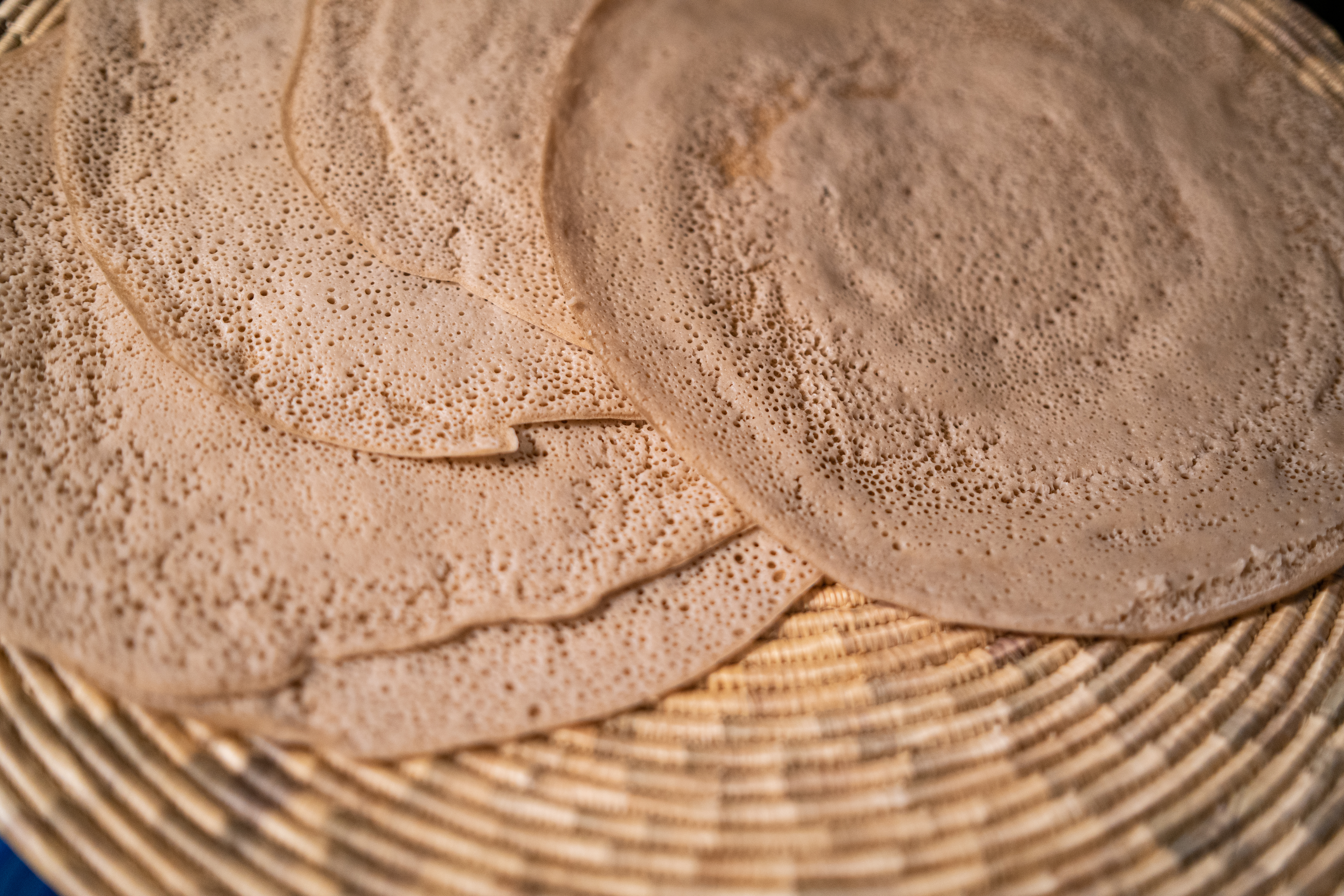
Pancake-like bread: injera

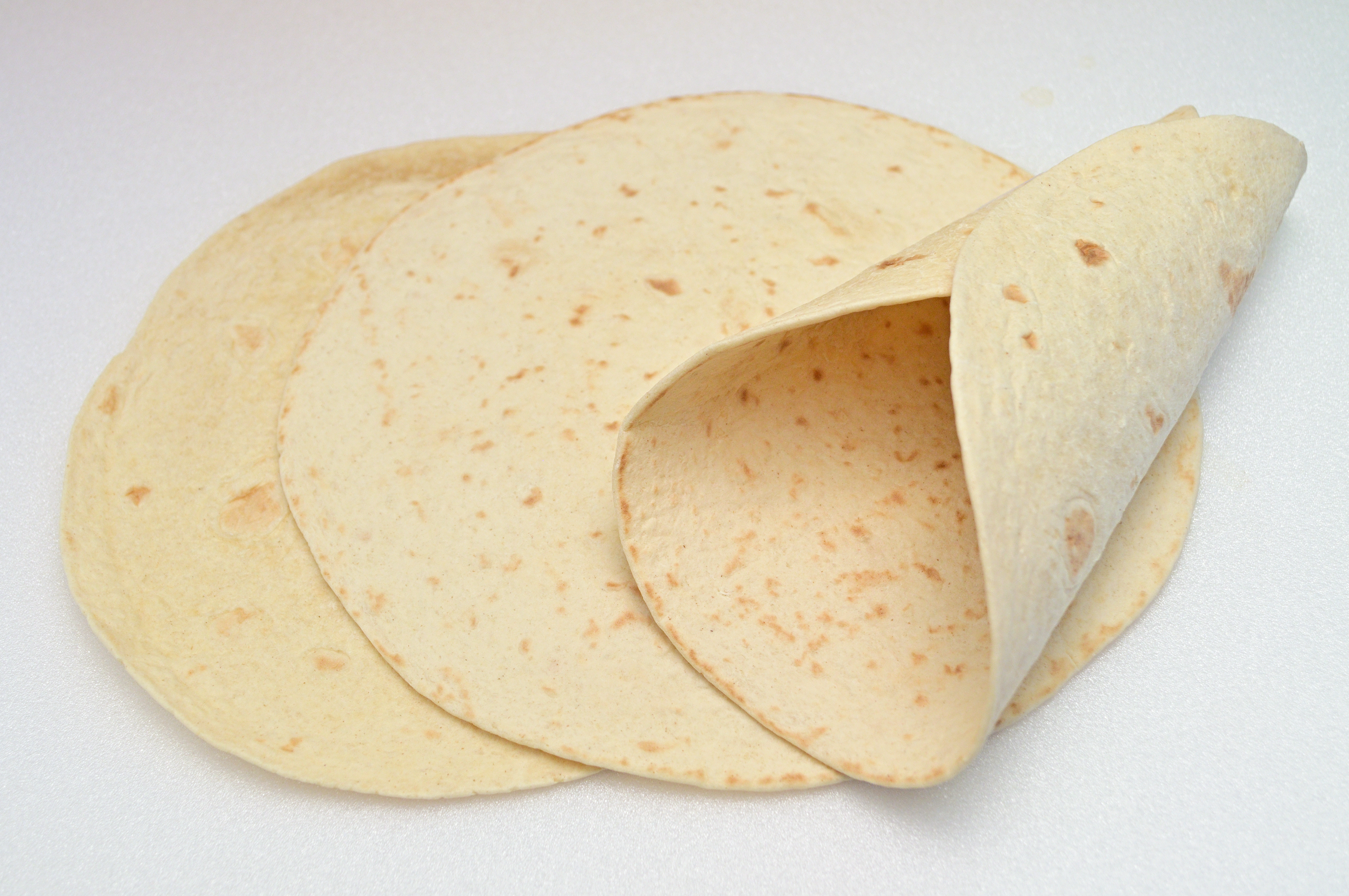
Single-layered, unleavened flatbread: wheat tortillas

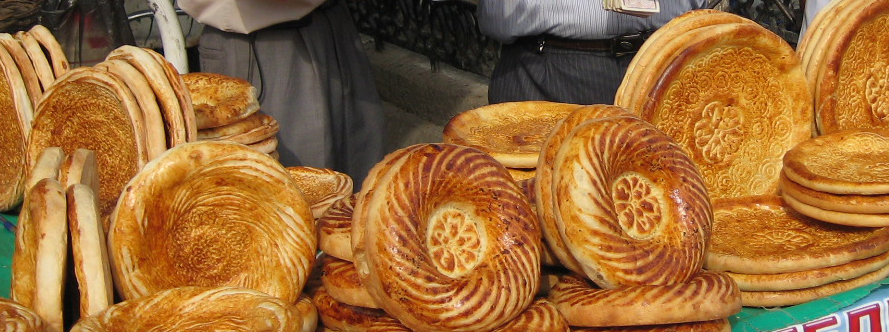
Single-layered, leavened flatbread: tandyr nan (note the stamped pattern)

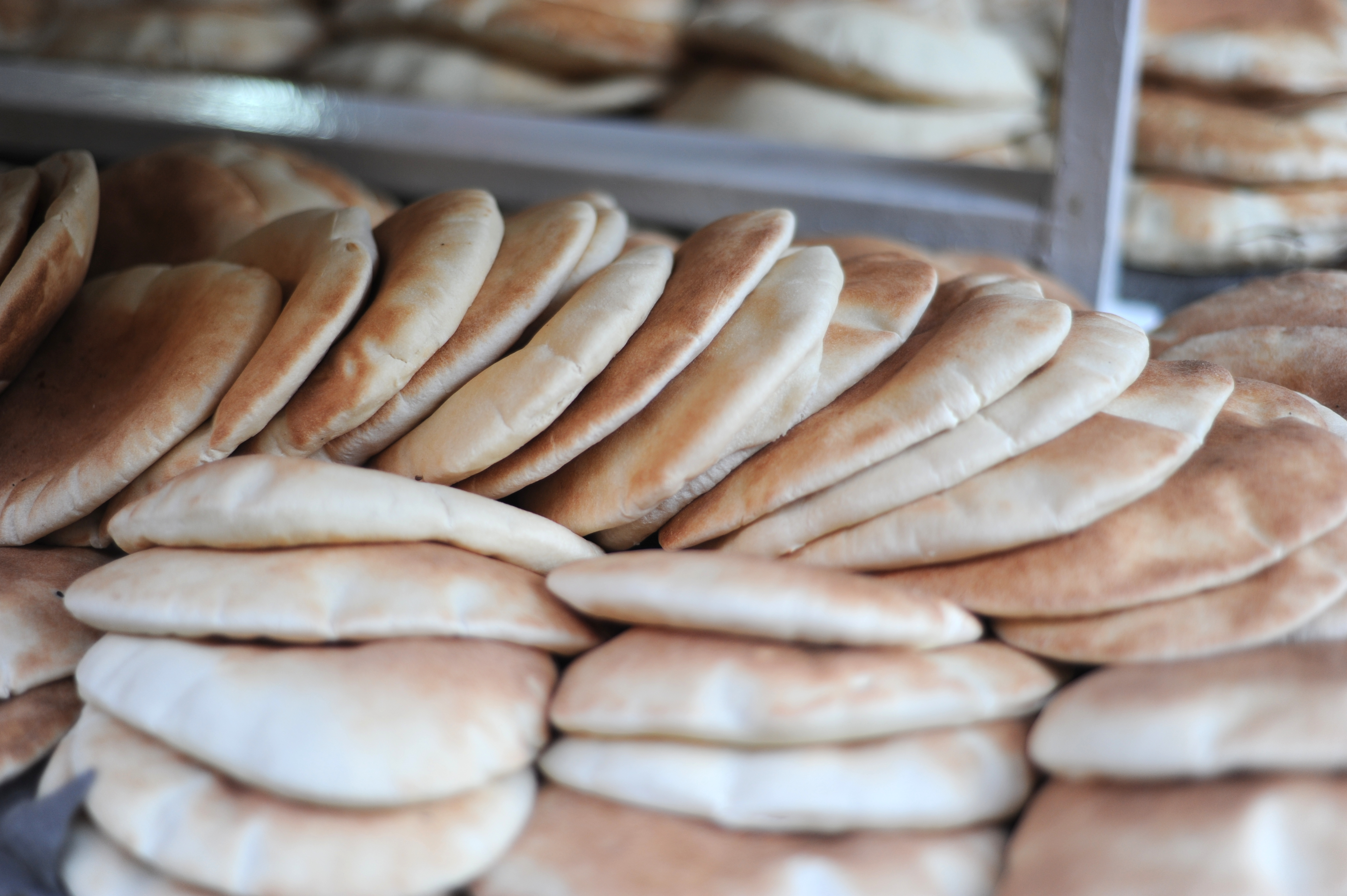
Double-layered flatbread: pita

Flatbreads are classified based on factors including use of dough or batter, being leavened or unleavened, baking method, and form. They can be divided into single-layered and double-layered flatbreads, depending on their cross-section. Most types are single-layered flatbreads, which include flatbreads baked on griddles or in vertical ovens. They are eaten globally. Flatbreads are more specifically divided into four loose categories:

- Pancake-like breads are batter-based. (Note: Batter-based breads may be considered a sub-category of single-layered, leavened flatbreads.) They are usually fermented twice; a lack of fermentation would result in a gummy texture. They usually use non-wheat flour, so they are common in places where wheat is uncommon. These include the teff-based injera of Ethiopian cuisine and the sorghum-based kisra of Sudanese cuisine.
- Single-layered, unleavened flatbreads are made of dough that does not undergo fermentation. They usually use wheat flour, and the flavor comes entirely from the flour as it is not altered by fermentation. They have a denser crumb than leavened breads, and they are very thin as their texture would otherwise be difficult to eat. These include tortillas and roti, which are about 1.3–3 mm thick and 12–25 cm (4.7–9.8 in) across.
- Single-layered, leavened flatbreads are thick and do not expand while baking. They are leavened twice, which makes them bubbly and soft, enabling them to be as thick as 4 cm. They are docked to limit expansion, which may involve firmly pressing the dough or puncturing it with a roller docker. Central Asian breads such as tandyr nan are docked with patterned stamps as decoration or branding. (Note: The technique of using decorative stamps is known in Uzbek as bosma and in Turkmen and Uyghur as durtlik.) Other ways to prevent expansion are baking at a lower temperature or baking immediately after rolling the dough. Single-layered, leavened flatbreads include pizza and naan.
- Double-layered, leavened flatbreads have the dough separate during baking. They are thin, being rolled to a few millimeters and not docked. They are fermented twice, producing air bubbles and a thin skin. They may be fermented for over 20 minutes, which is longer than single-layered versions. They inflate from carbon dioxide and other gases that are present in the dough due to fermentation, kneading, or moisture. They are always baked in domed ovens as they must be placed horizontally for proper inflation. Their flour is often high in gluten, which increases inflation, and is high-extraction. After baking, they are flexible, with a pocket in the middle. Double-layered flatbreads, including pita, are common in the Middle East and North Africa and have gained popularity elsewhere in the modern day.

== Industrial manufacturing ==
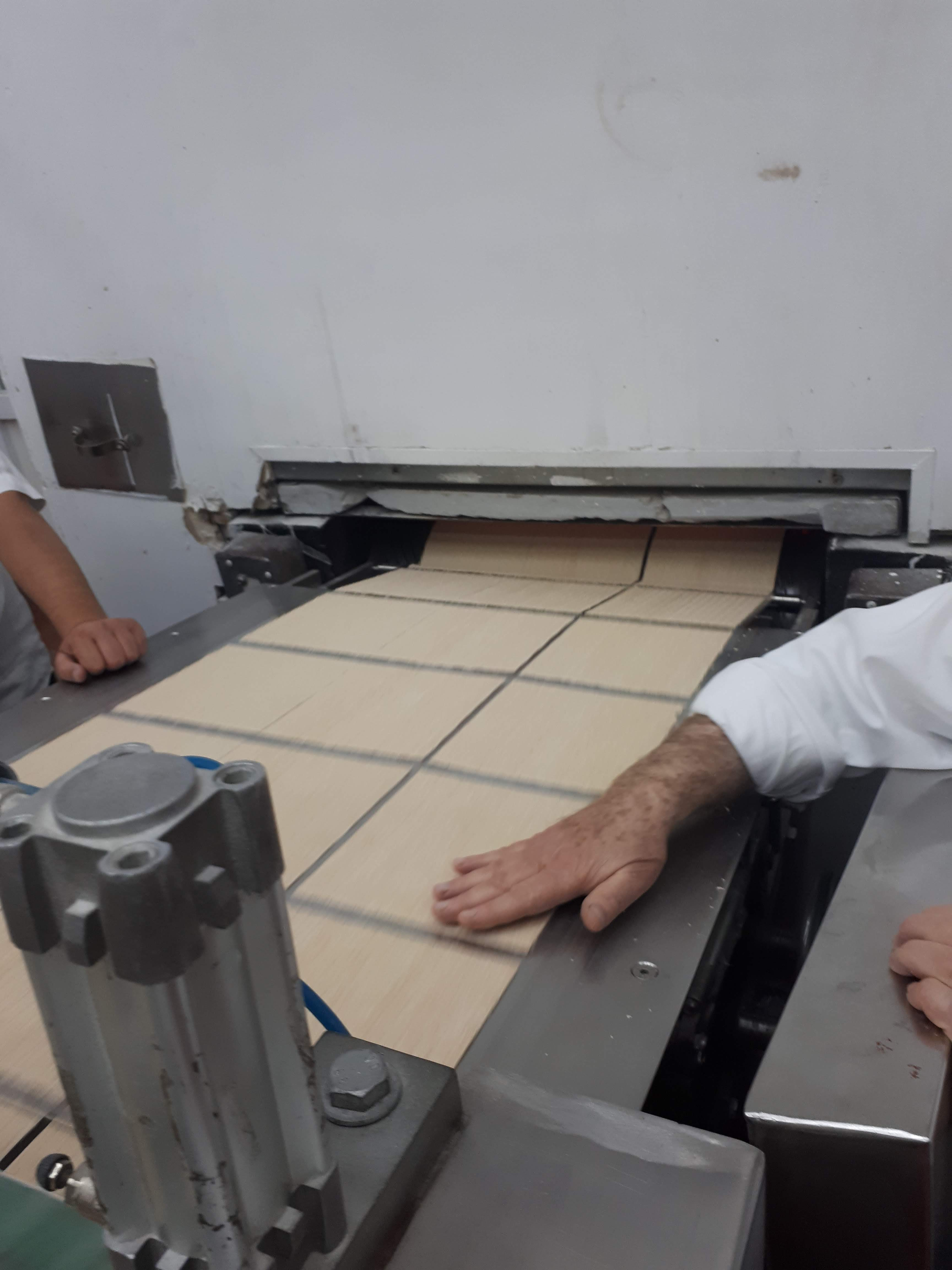
Matzah dough on a conveyor belt

Machines can automate or semi-automate every step of flatbread production: kneading, sheeting, fermenting, baking, cooling, and packaging. Equipment like dough mixers and sheeters are the same for flatbreads and loaf breads. Industrial ovens are controlled to bake at a constant temperature. Extrusion cooking is a technology applied to many flatbreads.

Ready-to-eat (RTE) flatbreads are fully baked. Ready-to-cook (RTC) flatbreads consist of either sheets of raw dough or dough that has been parbaked, which involves baking enough to break down starch and gluten without forming a crust, allowing it to be finished later. Parbaked and RTE flatbreads use the same baking methods.

Industrially produced flatbreads are shaped using hot pressing or die cutting, or by hand. Single- or double-layer flatbreads are baked directly on conveyor belts, which can be used for several varieties with slight modifications. Mesh conveyor belts are used, allowing heat from above and below. Certain flatbreads use other industrial baking methods, such as electric tandoors. Unleavened and leavened flatbreads follow similar processes, with the latter adding a fermentation step. Industrial leavened flatbreads usually use pure baker's yeast. They are shaped with a rotary cutter and are baked for 1–2 minutes. For some leavened, single-layered flatbreads, surfactants are added to make the dough easier to flatten. For double-layered flatbreads, oxidizing agents are added to improve gluten formation, and the dough is folded to form the layers. The automation of pancake-like breads is more complicated, requiring equipment that can pour liquid.

RTC flatbreads are more prone to spoiling due to their higher moisture, so they must be frozen, whereas RTE flatbreads can be stored at room temperature for two days but must be refrigerated or frozen for longer periods. Unbaked flatbreads are more difficult to shape and may experience loss of leavening or enzyme-induced discoloration, but they do not undergo starch retrogradation. The shelf life is increased using various kinds of packaging, preservatives, or freezing. They usually have several flatbreads in one package. The market research firm Mintel found that, between 2015 and 2021, there were at least 12,987 commercial flatbread products. It found that 64% of such products were shelf-stable and 95% were packaged in plastic.

== Use ==
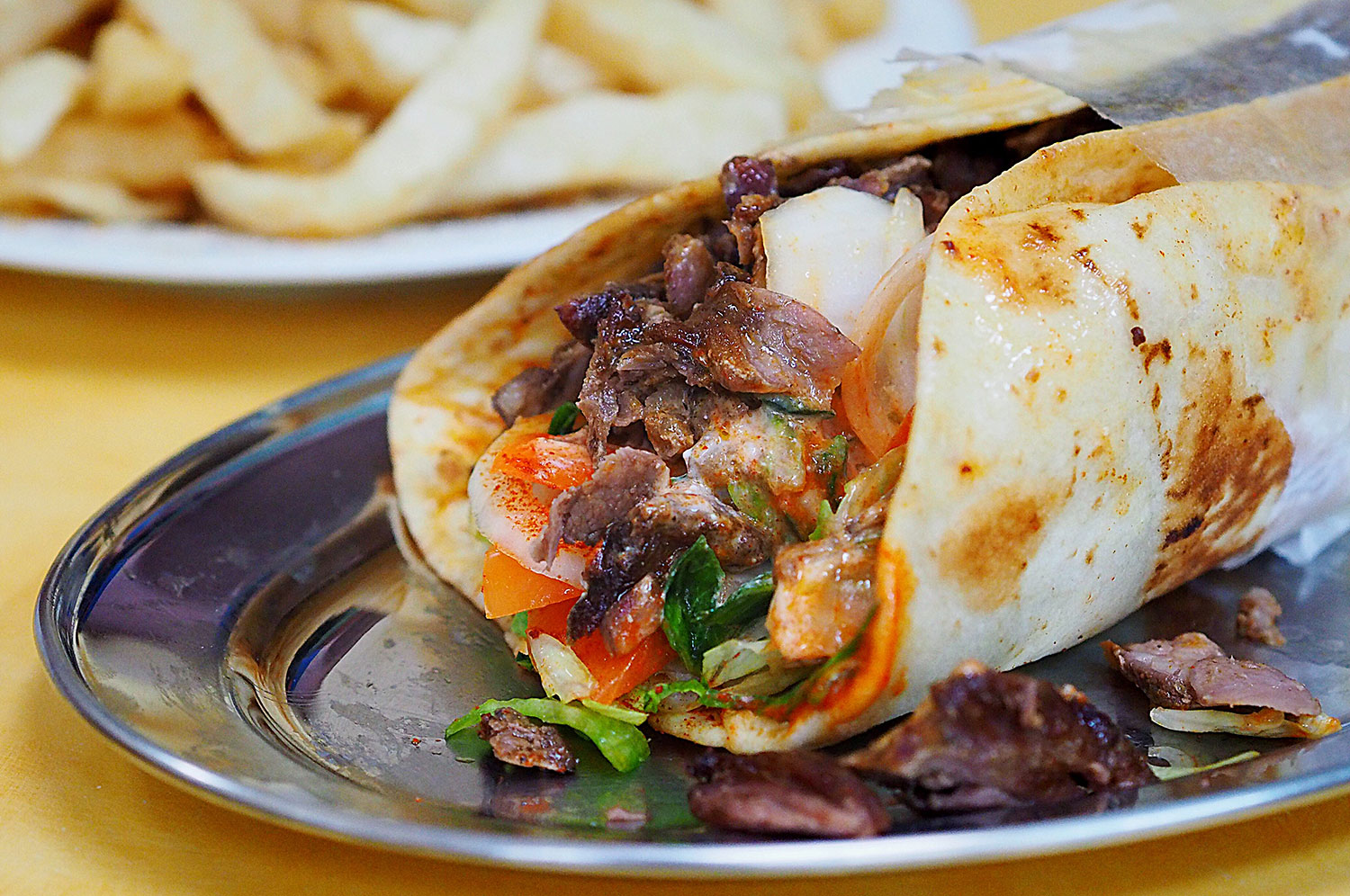
Gyros wrapped in flatbread

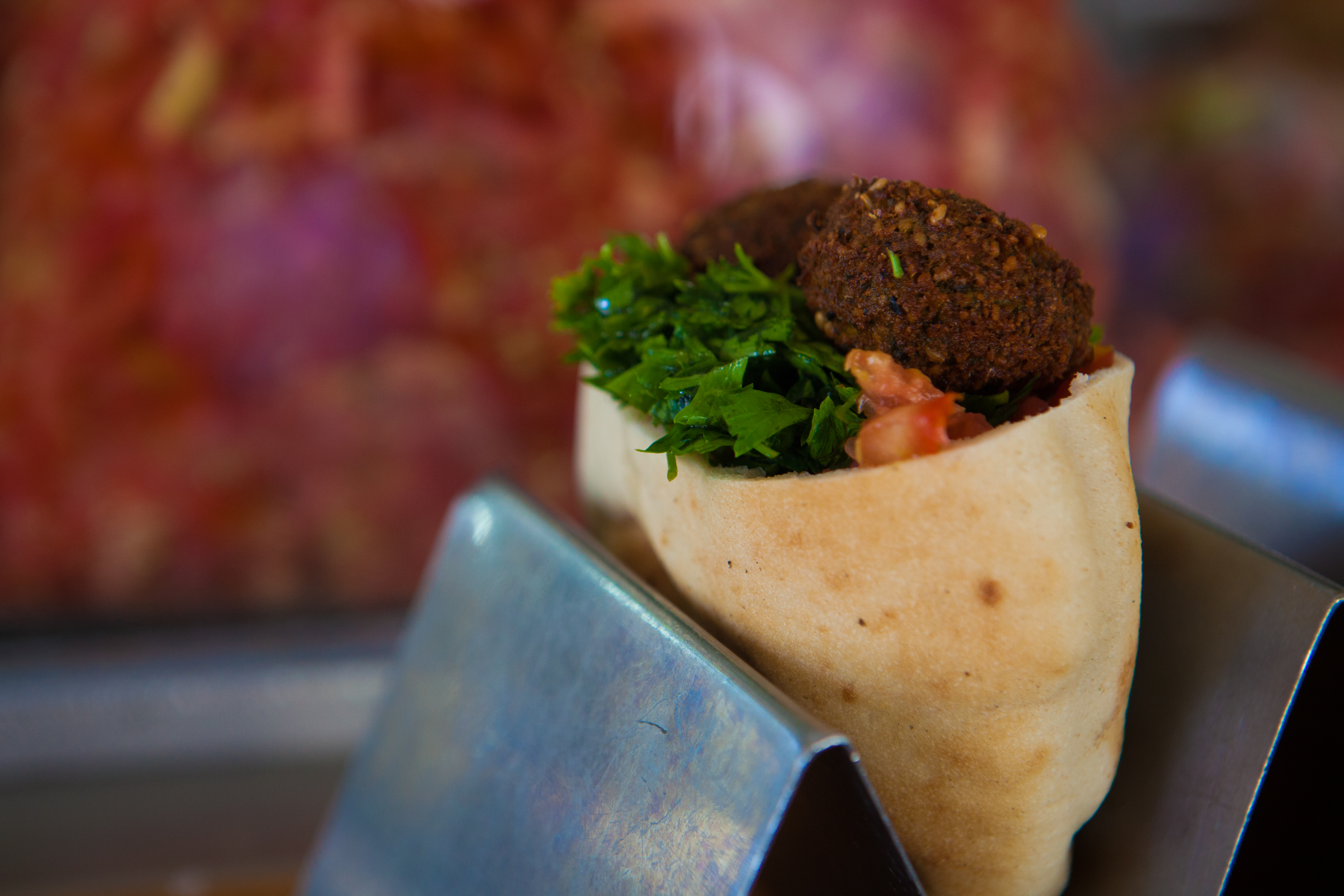
Pita filled with falafel

Pieces of flatbread can be torn off to pick up pieces of food, functioning as a utensil. This is often done with moist foods. Flatbread can also function as a serving plate. Many types of leavened flatbread are served as dishes within meals.

Many dishes consist of a flatbread wrapped around other foods, similar to a sandwich, (Note: A sandwich typically contains two slices of bread around a food, but the concept has extended to include flatbreads that are stuffed or wrapped with other foods.) increasing the convenience of eating the food. Maize tortillas are used for several such foods, including tacos and enchiladas. Wheat flatbreads may be used with spit-roasted meats, such as shawarma and gyros; types of wheat flatbreads used for wrapped foods include lavash, naan, chapati, or kulcha. Other flatbreads are used for spring rolls. In North American cuisine, a wrap is a category of sandwiches, commonly using a tortilla. Double-layered flatbreads such as pita can have toppings such as meat and vegetables placed in the pocket.

Flatbreads like chapati are made fresh for every meal. Drying flatbreads increases shelf life by limiting mold growth. Lavash is so thin that it dries soon after baking. Other types are baked twice to dry them; double-layered flatbreads such as pane carasau are sliced edgewise to separate the layers before the second bake. Dried flatbreads are either rehydrated by sprinkling water or added to dishes such as bread soups or casseroles.

== History ==
=== Origin ===
Flatbreads were the earliest form of bread and perhaps the earliest processed food. They became common across the world by the Neolithic period, arising independently in most societies that had sufficient grain production. They were a major food source in ancient civilizations, using locally cultivated grains as inter-regional trade was not yet common. They may have initially been baked over open fires before the use of griddles, with vertical ovens appearing much later. They were initially made of non-cereal starches, with cereal grain flatbreads emerging at least 20,000 years ago. The oldest archaeological excavation of flatbread was at a Natufian site called Shubayqa 1 in Jordan, dating to 12,400 BC, some 4,000 years before the start of agriculture in the region.

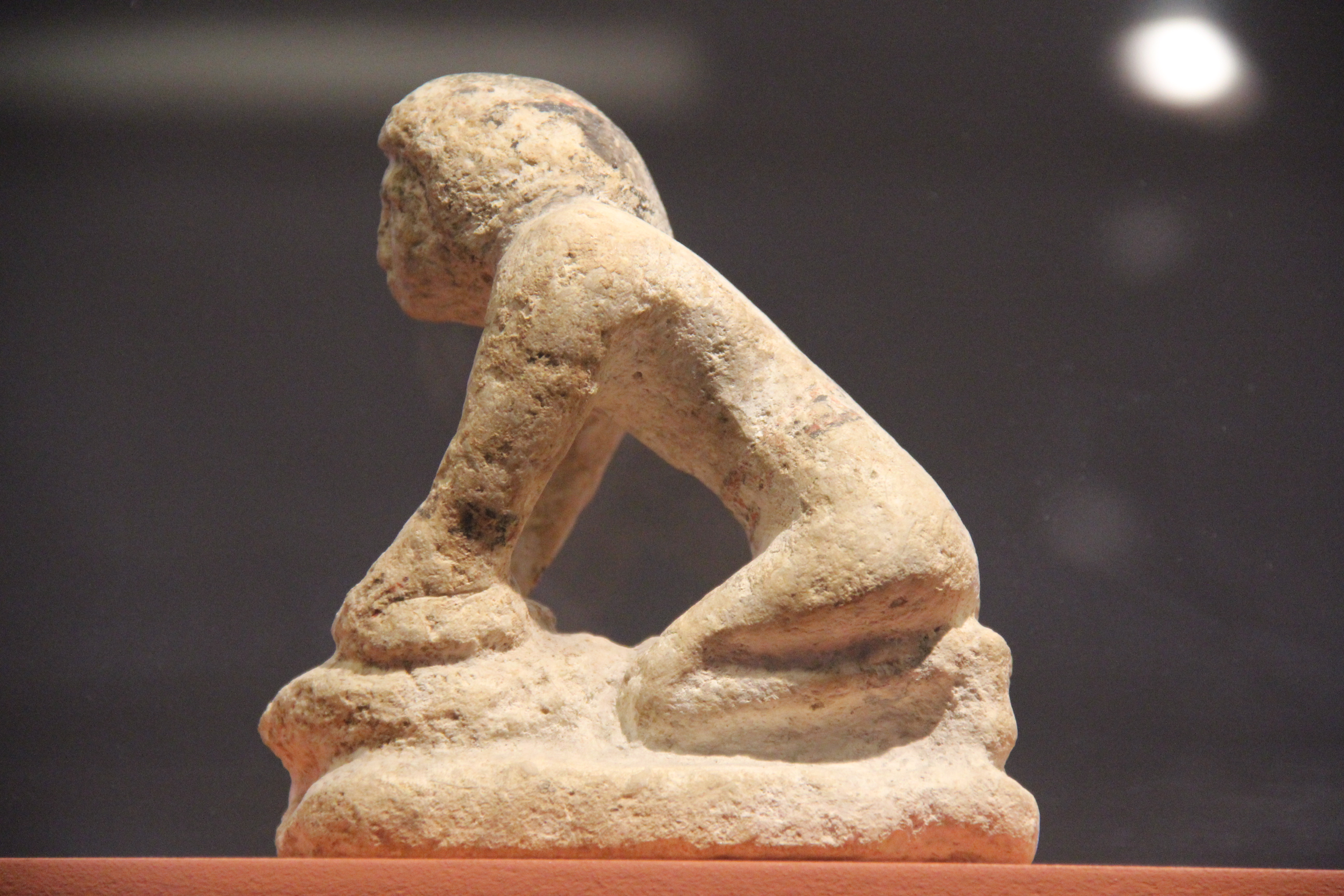
Ancient Egyptian depiction of dough kneading

The domestication of various cereal grains occurred at several agricultural centers of origin, and pulses were also domesticated during this period. The first center of origin was the Fertile Crescent in West Asia in the 9th millennium BC, domesticating wheat and barley, (Note: Cereal crops from other centers of origin included teff in Ethiopia, sorghum and pearl millet in other parts of Africa, and maize in the Americas.) which subsequently spread to other regions of the world. Flatbreads spread alongside cereal crops from the Fertile Crescent, reaching the Indian subcontinent, the Arabian Peninsula, the Horn of Africa, North Africa, and across the Mediterranean to Iberia and Sardinia. After reaching Anatolia, flatbreads spread into the Caucasus and East Turkestan. Barley breads were popular before the invention of leavening, which popularized wheat.

Evidence of flatbread production has been found at ancient sites in Mesopotamia, Egypt, and the Indus Civilization. The bread in Ancient Mesopotamian cuisine, mentioned in cuneiform tablets from c. 2400 BC, was flat because the flour was low in gluten, and was baked on a stone. Ancient Egyptian paintings depict various types of bread, including flatbread. The Maya civilization began producing maize flatbreads as early as the 12th century BC. Sourdough flatbreads became a staple in Europe by the Iron Age. Ember-baked flatbreads are attested in the Old Testament, the New Testament, and the Talmud. (Note: For example, ember-baked flatbread is mentioned in the New Testament verse John 21:9.)

=== In pre-industrial cultures ===
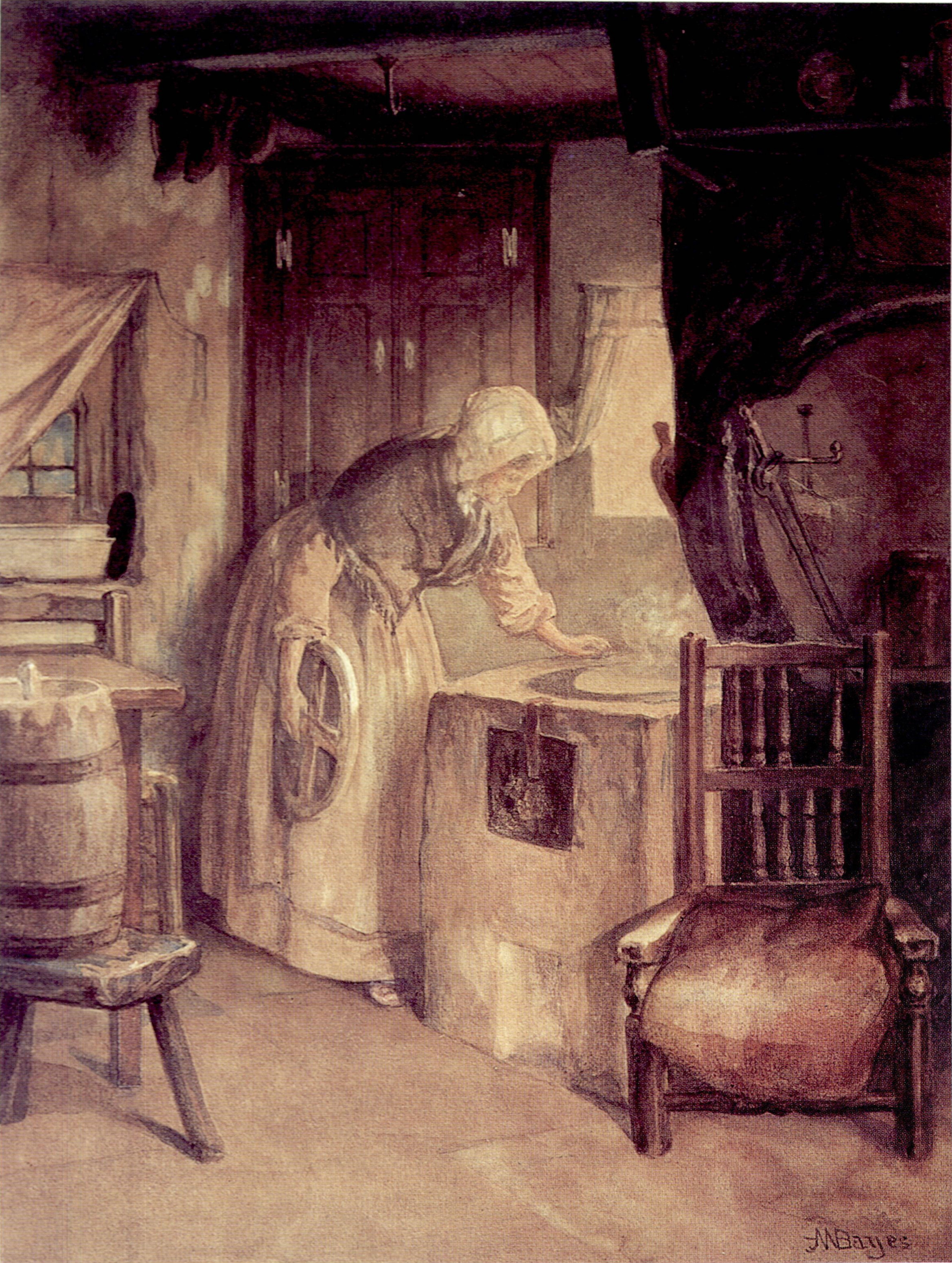
1880s English depiction of oatcakes

In Ancient Greek, Etruscan, and Ancient Roman cuisine, flatbreads were eaten as street food as people did not have kitchens at home. Popular flatbreads during the Roman era are likely the ancestors of modern Italian and French flatbreads. The Greco-Roman world placed higher importance on refined wheat loaf breads than other breads. The medical writings of Galen, which were very influential on European views on bread, said that loaf breads were better than flatbreads.

In the Tang dynasty of China, flatbreads baked in vertical ovens are attested by the 7th century. Still, bread was unusual in Chinese cuisine. Flatbreads were eaten in the Medieval Middle East, with a 13th-century cookbook by Muhammad bin Hasan al-Baghdadi listing six varieties. The Arabs had influence on Spain and Southern Italy, likely influencing flatbreads of the region. Laws in Medieval Italy restricted the use of ovens for most households, causing flatbreads to be made with griddles or other tools. Maize was a staple in the pre-Columbian Americas, with maize tortillas being the most common bread. Wheat was introduced to the Americas during the Columbian Exchange, leading to the creation of wheat tortillas.

Into the early modern and modern era, European cuisine placed loaf breads at the top of the hierarchy of grain products, above griddle-baked flatbreads, ember-baked flatbreads (known as ash cakes), and pancakes. Still, some parts of Europe consumed flatbreads rather than loaf breads. For example, oatcakes were consumed in Scotland, Scandinavia, and Northern England. In Scotland, Ireland, and Northern England, flatbreads mixing whole grain and pulse flour are attested until the mid-19th century. In Norway, flatbreads were more common than loaf breads until the late 19th century.

=== Modern industry ===
Flatbread production has increased amid a shift toward industrial production. Development of the industry has been impacted by urbanization, busy lifestyles, and health and sustainability concerns. Flatbreads gained familiarity in the United States as restaurants serving Mexican, Indian, Greek, and Turkish cuisine became popular, and as international travel increased. Lavash and Swedish crispbread became well-known in the country in the 1970s. Pita was popularized in the country by Harry Toufayan, who founded Toufayan Bakeries in the 1960s, and pita bakeries were common by the 1980s. The American Flatbread Company, founded by George Schenk in 1985, has also been credited with pioneering the country's flatbread industry. Store-bought flatbreads became widespread in India around the 2010s as people had less time to cook, as household size decreased and more women entered the workforce.

== Consumption ==
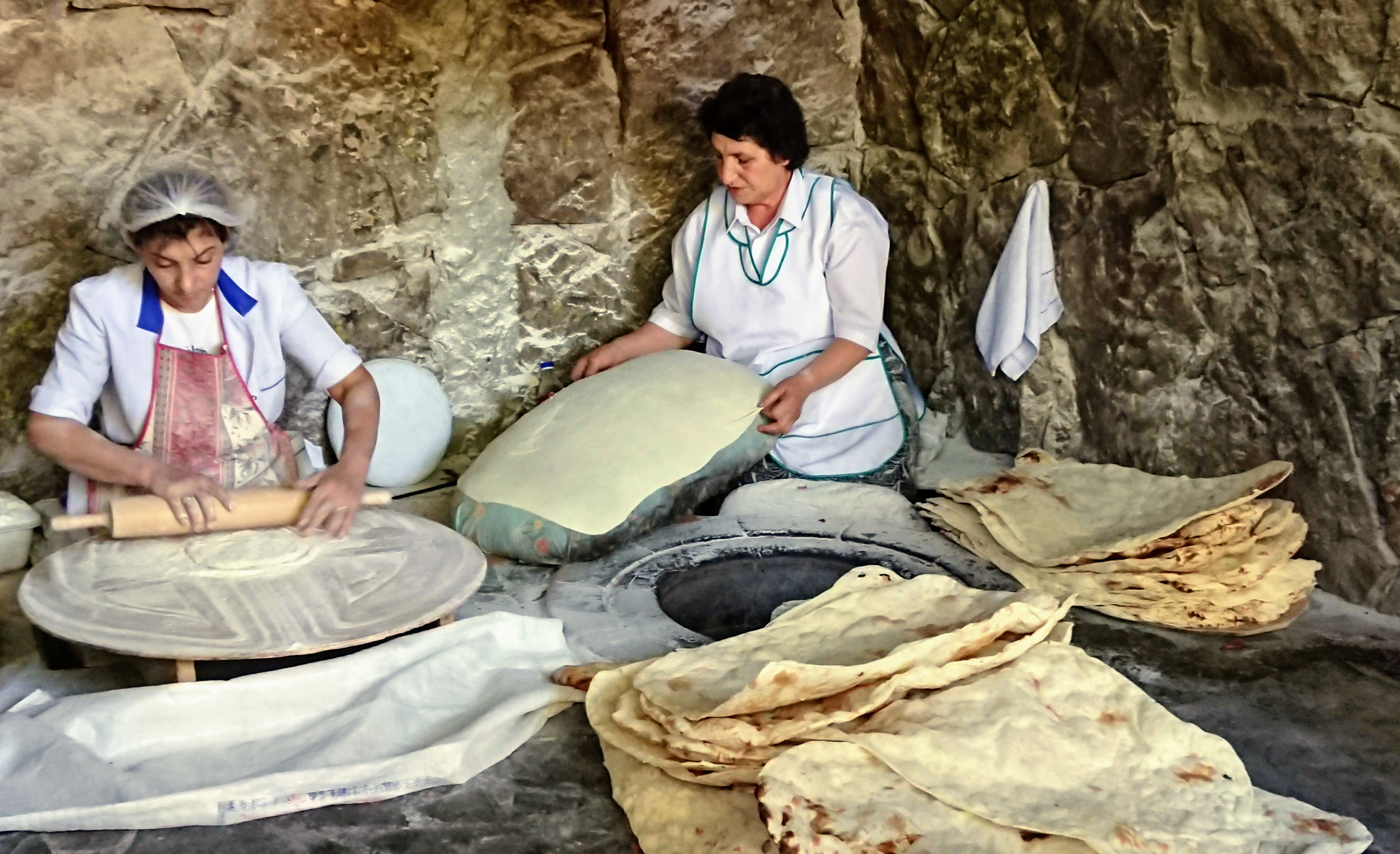
Armenian women preparing a batch of lavash

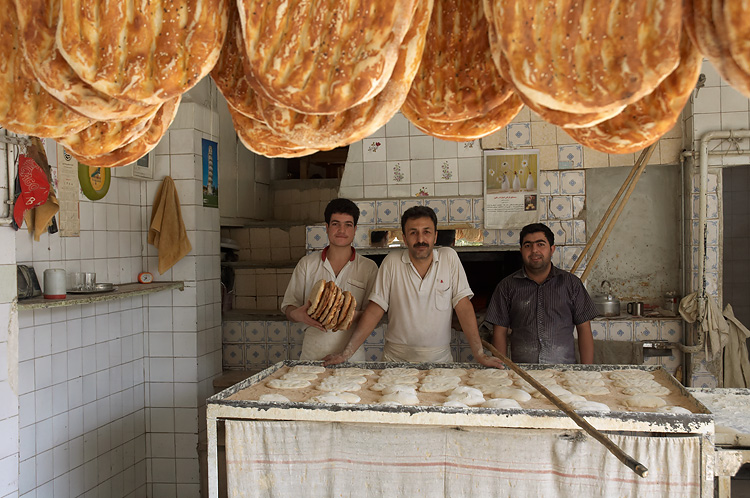
Barbari at a bakery in Tehran

Flatbreads are the most common type of bread, with over one billion consumers. They are often staple foods, with the average person consuming over 130 kg annually in countries including Egypt, Kuwait, Iran, Azerbaijan, and Kazakhstan. Requiring only flour and water with no specialized tools, flatbreads are simple to make and eat. They can be an efficient way to utilize available ingredients, so they contribute to subsistence economies and food security. In some remote areas, they comprise 90% of food consumption, causing undernutrition. Government subsidies for flatbreads are common. While some types of flatbread are important parts of their cultures' diets, others are eaten on special occasions. They may hold ceremonial significance, being baked as part of a religious, cultural, or harvest festival.

Flatbreads are produced in a range of settings, including households, street food vendors, restaurants, small-scale bakeries, and automated bakeries. In regions where they are more typical than loaf breads, flatbreads are prepared in rural homes or urban small-scale bakeries, while loaf breads are mass-produced and sold by supermarkets. Street vendors commonly use griddles to make flatbreads. Areas with high poverty and subsistence economies have specific social systems surrounding flatbread production.

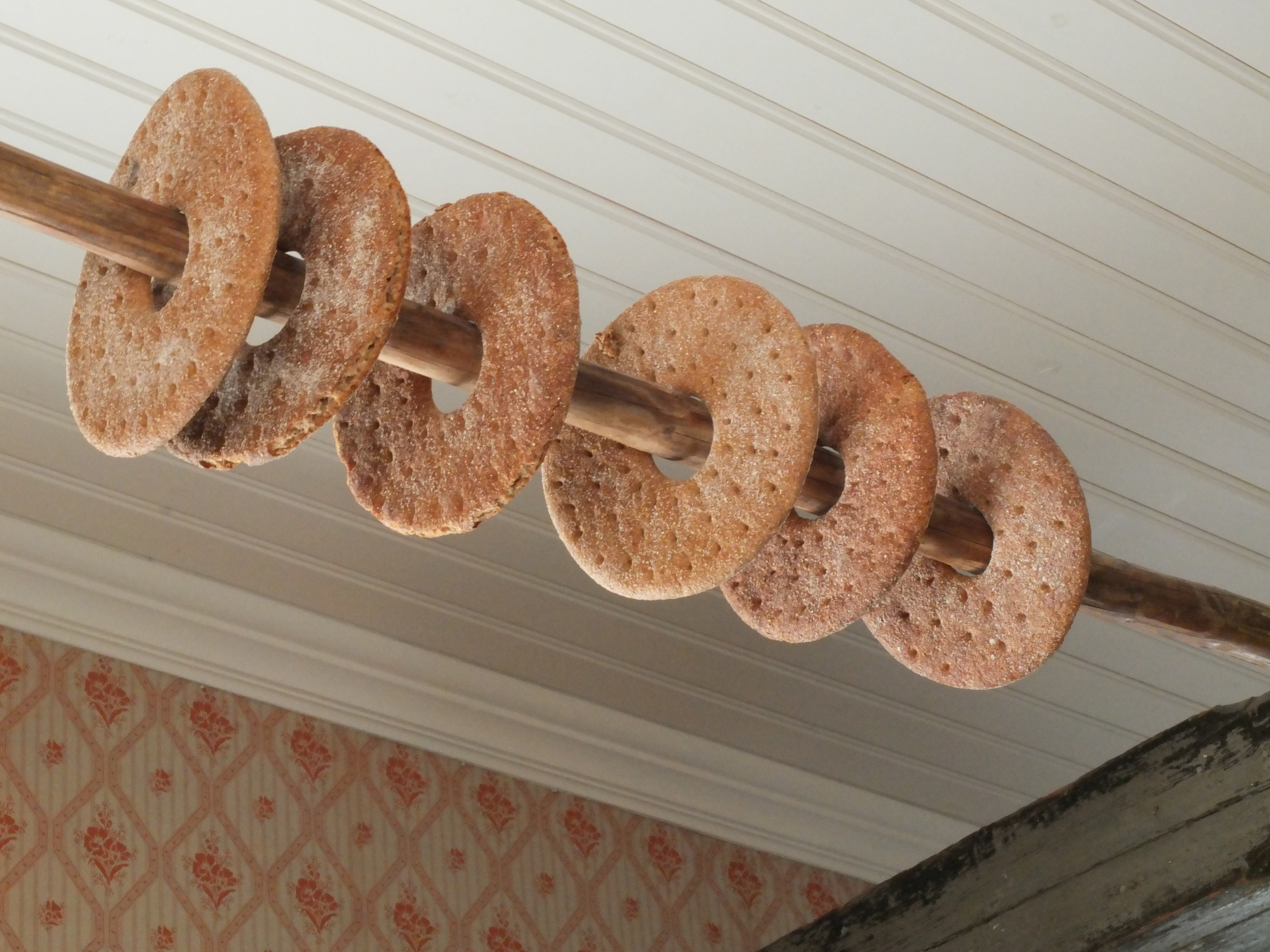
Dried ruisreikäleipä is placed on rods for storage.

Drying flatbreads to eat later is a common practice in several parts of Eurasia. For example, in Armenia, lavash is made in large batches to be stored dry. Stacks of dried flatbread can easily be carried, which makes flatbreads popular among nomadic communities that require light loads. For example, the Sardinian flatbread pane carasau was historically carried by shepherds. Some dried flatbreads are hung on rods, including the ring-shaped Finnish ruisreikäleipä and others in parts of Scandinavia and Anatolia.

Some flatbreads are mass-produced. The largest is pizza, which had a market size of $160 billion in 2020, while wrap-type flatbreads are also common. The exact size of the flatbread industry is uncertain as it encompasses different types of products. By one estimate, the global market size of non-pizza flatbreads was $81.8 billion in 2018. By another estimate, the market size increased from $38.8 billion in 2018 to $41.17 billion in 2019, projected to a compound annual growth rate of 6.2%. Some of the most popular types are tortillas, pita, naan, paratha, and focaccia. Single-layered flatbreads are particularly popular due to ease of automation. Ready-to-eat (RTE) and frozen flatbreads are common as convenient, affordable, and versatile products. RTE flatbreads are popular as they can easily be used to make sandwiches at home. For example, a type of lavash is marketed for making wraps. Flatbread sandwiches and wraps are also sold as fast food or airline food.

== By region ==
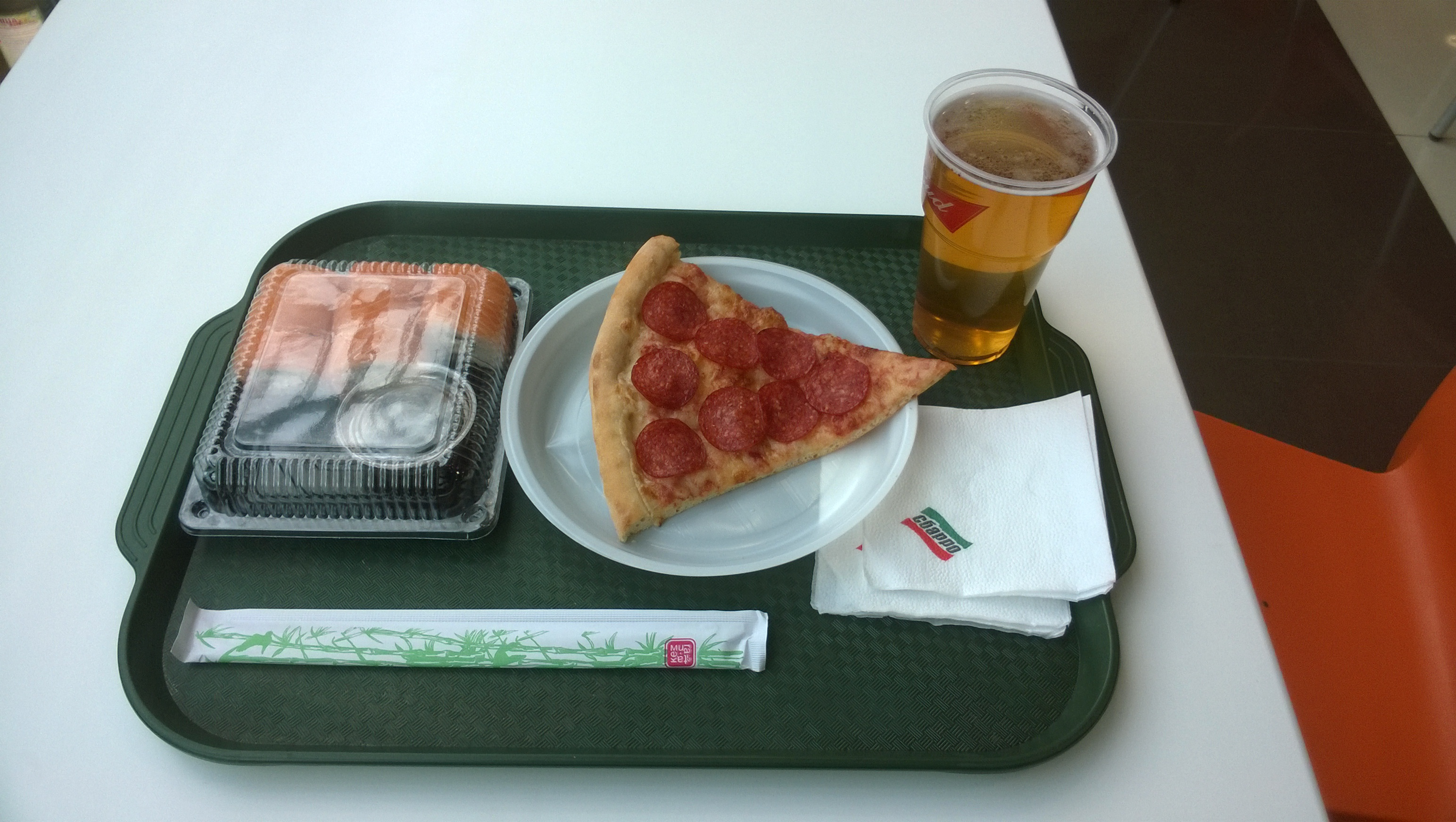
Pizza is served as fast food worldwide.

Flatbreads are predominant in North African, Middle Eastern, Caucasian, Central Asian, and North Indian cuisines. Common features of these regions are hot climates with little firewood, making loaf bread difficult, and economies with low industrialization. Flatbreads are also staples in the cuisine of Mexico and Central America, as well as in the Horn of Africa, while versions exist in Chinese cuisine and European (including Southern European and Scandinavian) cuisines.

Regional cuisines use different flours for flatbreads. Wheat and barley are common in the cuisines of Southern Europe, North Africa, and the Middle East. Wheat flatbreads are common even in countries with limited wheat farming, requiring imports. Rice flatbreads exist in parts of Asia. Sorghum and millet flatbreads are eaten in many regions, including parts of Africa. Grains are mixed with pulses for some flatbreads in the Indian subcontinent, the Middle East, and North Africa.

Tandoor-baked flatbreads are common in many parts of Asia—including the Caucasus, Central Asia, and India—as well as some parts of Africa. Naan is a tandoor-baked flatbread made in various regions of Asia, between North India and the Middle East, with variations distinguished by how they are shaped or punched.

Flatbreads are uncommon in Western cuisine. In Western culture, flatbreads are often lumped into a single category comprising mostly unleavened breads. The culture places greater importance on loaf breads, though flatbreads have increased in stature in the modern day. Growing ethnic minorities and changing consumer demands have increased the popularity of flatbreads in the Western world; among these are pizza, pita, and tortillas. Some restaurants in Europe and North America have vertical ovens to bake flatbread.

Some flatbreads are eaten worldwide. Some are eaten at ethnic restaurants. Others are eaten as fast food, as pizza or wraps are useful at serving ingredients such as cheese, meat, and vegetables. Pizza is prepared differently in different regions.

=== South Asia ===
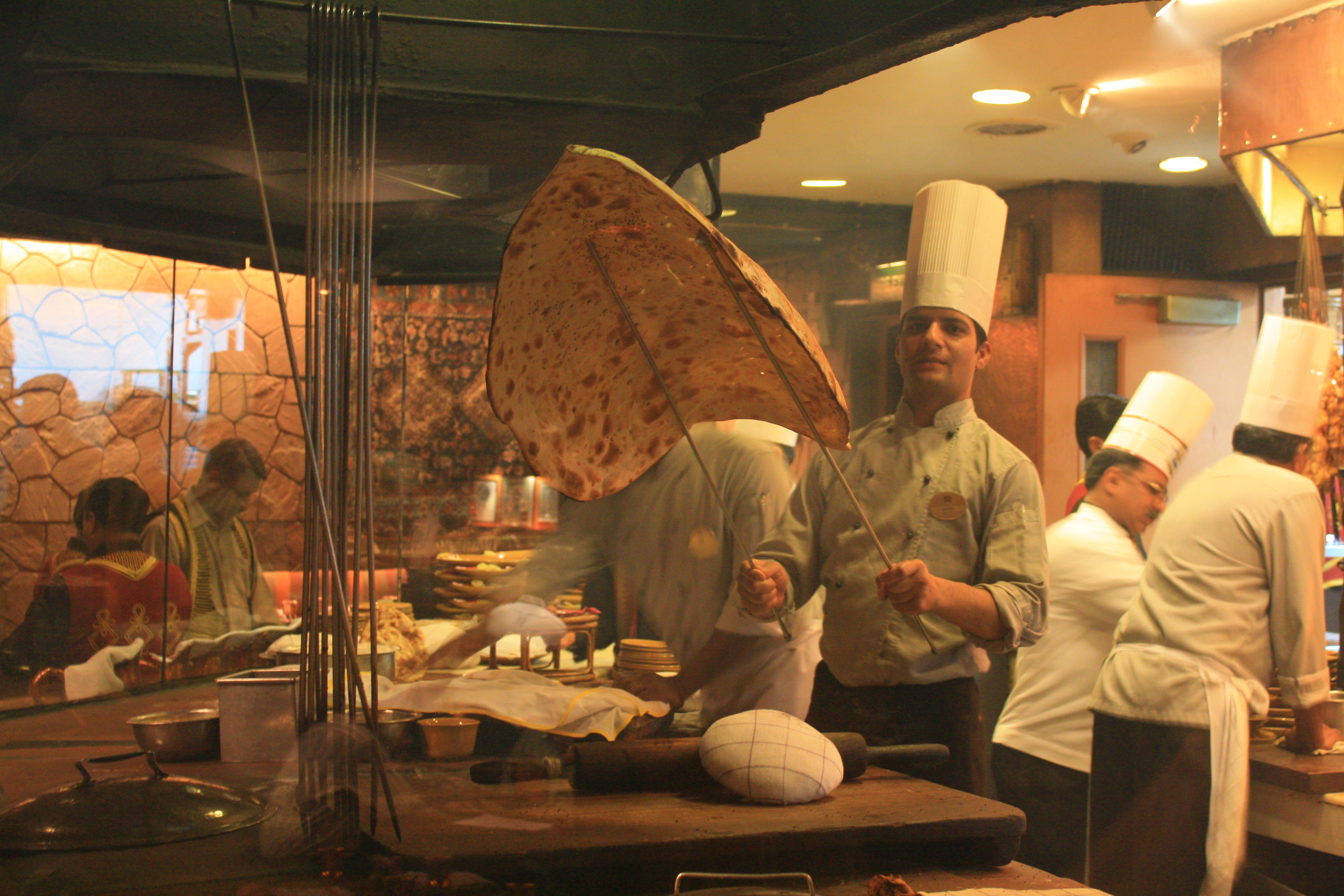
A restaurant chef preparing naan

Flatbreads are staples in the cuisines of India, Pakistan, Bangladesh, and Afghanistan. Indian flatbreads are mostly made of wheat, (Note: Two types of wheat flour are used for flatbreads in India: atta, which is whole-grain, and maida, which is refined. Whole wheat is more common.) though it may be blended with other flours. Chapati is the most common flatbread in the Indian subcontinent; besides this, the most consumed types in India are paratha and naan. Flatbreads are served with other foods to eat by hand.

Across India, either rice or flatbread is considered a requirement for a meal. North India's agriculture is dominated by wheat, so North Indian cuisine features wheat flatbreads including chapati, paratha, and puri. Many people across North India consume chapati every day, sometimes for two meals. It is also common in southern Nepal. Millet flatbreads are eaten in the cuisine of Western India, where the crop is common. South Indian cuisine features flatbreads made of rice flour or rice mixed with lentils. Wheat flatbreads have spread to South India—where some eat chapati every day—and are made using imported wheat in Sri Lankan cuisine.

Chapati, paratha, and puri are often homemade. Other flatbreads such as naan and tandoori roti are popular at restaurants, requiring tandoors or other equipment that households do not have. Indian households create wheat flour to store for a few weeks or purchase pre-made flour. In some communities built on subsistence agriculture, families harvest, mill, and bake grains into flatbreads themselves. In cities, street vendors use flatbreads for wraps (known as rolls).

=== Middle East and North Africa ===
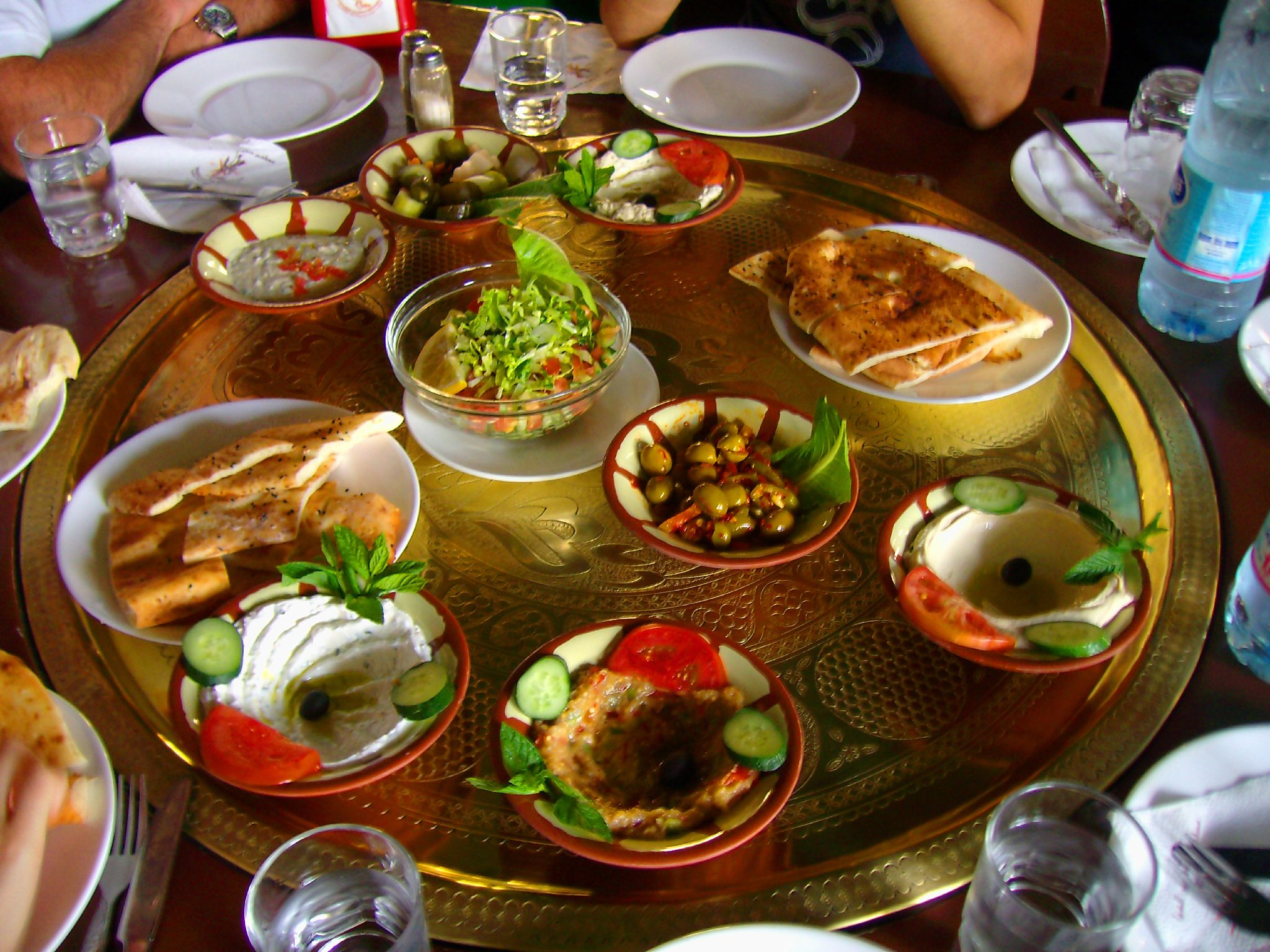
Flatbreads served with a meze meal

In Middle Eastern and North African cuisine, flatbreads are included in most meals. Most breads in Arab cuisine are flatbreads; they are used instead of utensils. Middle Eastern flatbreads are oven-baked and round and may or may not be leavened. They have a wide range of diameters and thicknesses, with some Arab flatbreads, such as saj bread, being paper-thin. Bakeries of the Middle East produce many types, including double-layered flatbreads, while bakeries of North Africa and Turkey produce thick flatbreads. The most common bread in the Eastern Mediterranean is pita, which is often mass-produced.

Dishes consisting of flatbreads mixed with other ingredients are a distinctive feature of Arab cuisine. These include soups, casseroles, and salads. Dishes based on dried flatbreads include fattoush and fatteh. Some Middle Eastern pastries consist of flatbread with additional ingredients.

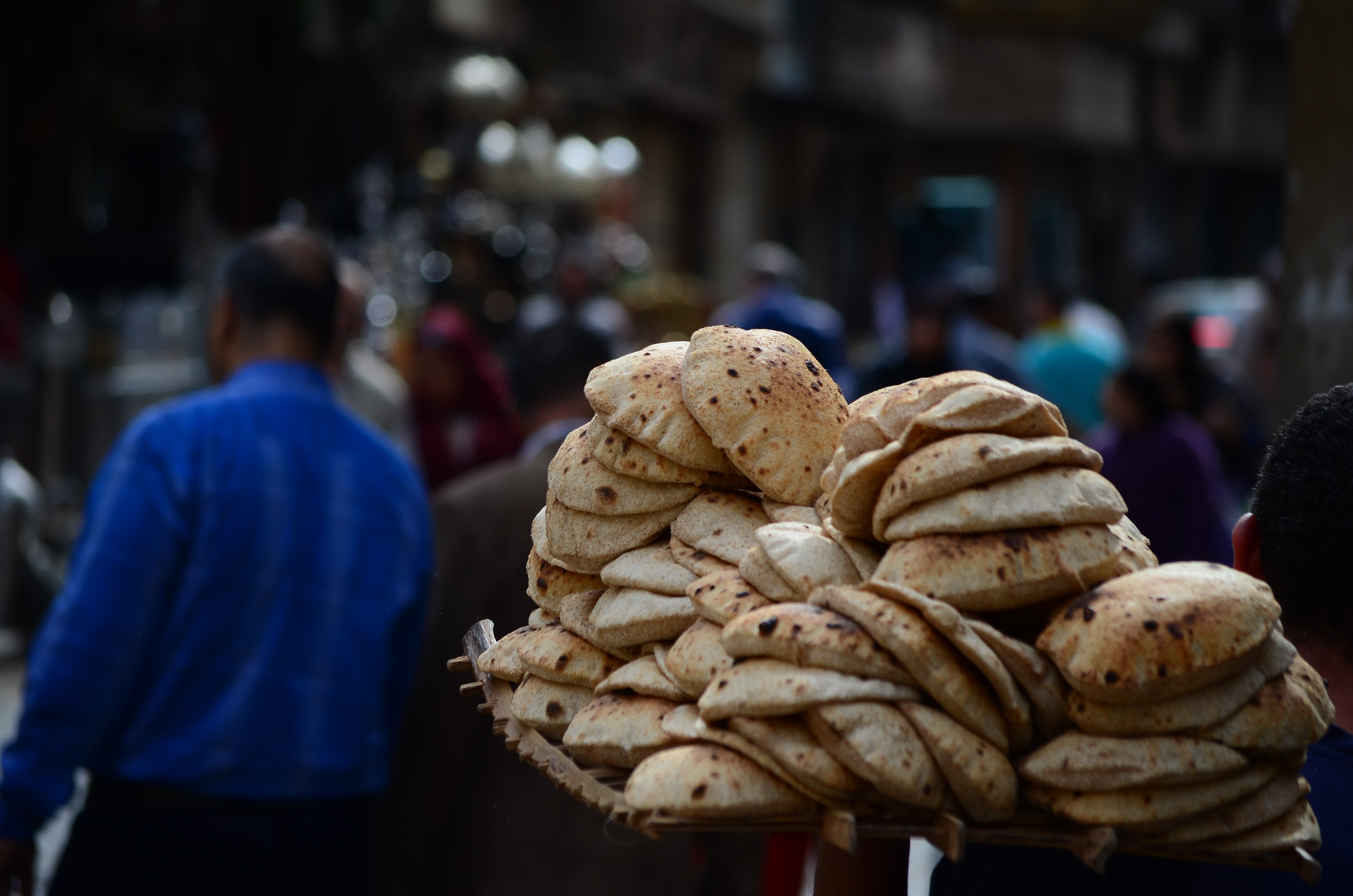
Baladi sold in Egypt

The Eastern Mediterranean has diverse flatbreads. Most are made only of wheat, while some mix wheat with barley, sorghum, or maize. They are oven-baked at very high temperatures. A meze meal consists of assorted small dishes served with flatbreads. In Egypt, flatbread is a major source of food, with baladi comprising half of the country's wheat consumption. Egypt's flatbreads are mostly made of imported wheat, though local flours are found in some rural areas.

In the Maghreb, nomads bake wheat or barley flatbreads in embers or on griddles, while villagers use vertical ovens or clay griddles. Bakeries are common in larger settlements. Moroccan cuisine has many types of bread, most of which are round, leavened flatbreads. It is common for Moroccans to prepare dough at home and have it baked at a bakery. In Algerian cuisine, some flatbreads are made of durum wheat.

Lavash is consumed in the northern Middle East, Iran, and other regions. Other flatbreads in Iran include taftoon, sangak, and barbari. Iranians commonly purchase bread from bakeries daily. There are several flatbreads in Turkish cuisine, including lavash, yufka, and pide. They are mostly homemade in villages but have gained popularity in cities in the modern day. In Yemeni and Omani cuisine, Indian flatbreads like chapati and puri are popular.

Arab flatbreads are baked on either the sides or bottom of an oven, with some villages having communal ovens. Bedouin tribes bake using embers, either directly or with a metal plate. A type of vertical oven unique to Tunisia has space to bake flatbread on the bottom of the oven; the bread is partially baked on the wall before being flipped to bake on the floor, leaning against the wall. Another type from Jordan and Palestine is very wide, and flatbread is baked on pebbles on the floor. Many North African cultures build beehive-shaped ovens to maximize heat from limited fuel. In Yemen, tandoors are portable, so they are used for flatbreads in home kitchens; a similar portable oven known as a kanoon is used for flatbreads in Morocco.

=== Caucasus and Central Asia ===
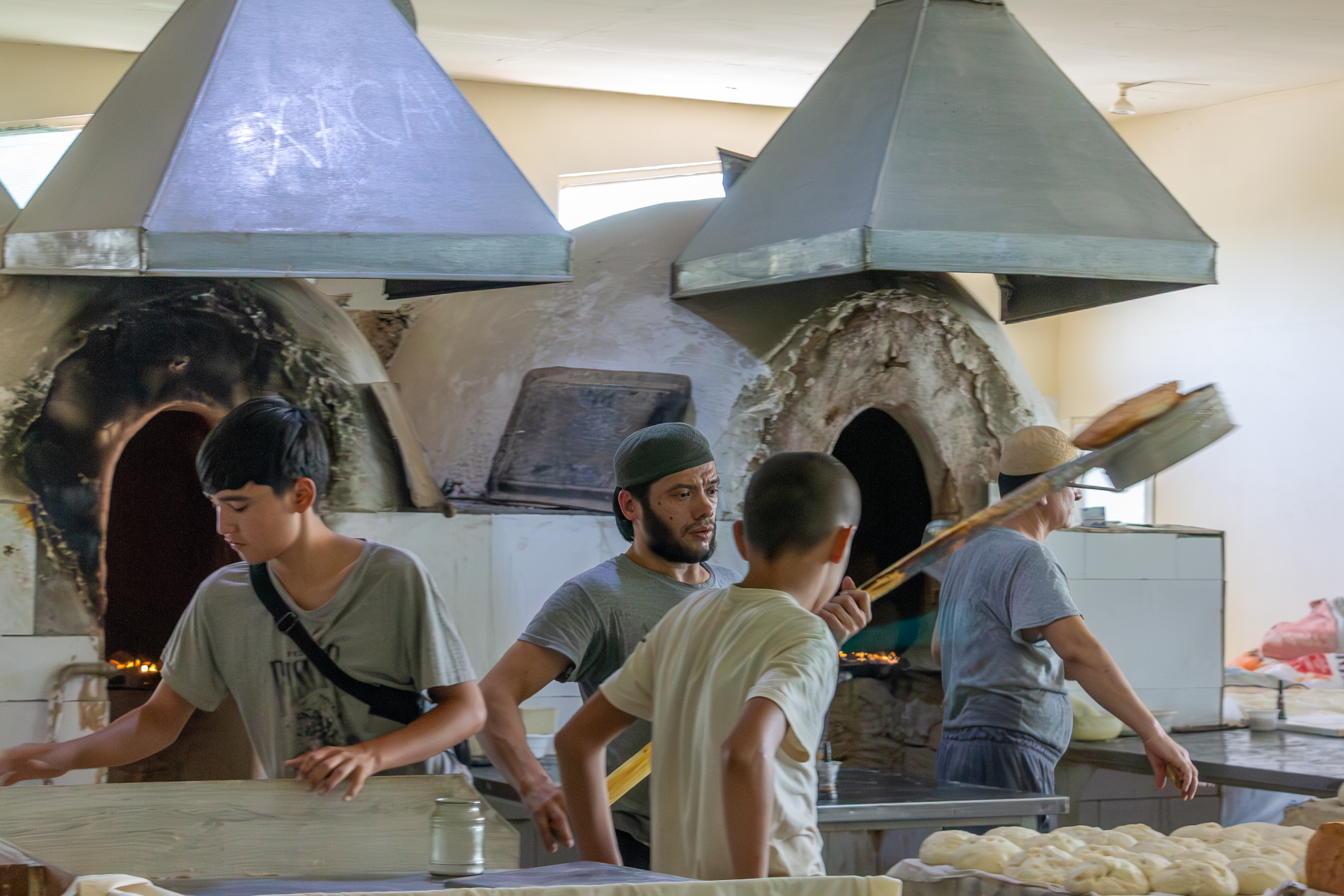
A bakery in Tashkent, Uzbekistan

Flatbreads are staples in the cuisines of Armenia, Georgia, Azerbaijan, Turkmenistan, Uzbekistan, and Tajikistan. These flatbreads are made mostly of wheat, but several other cereals are used.

Flatbreads are common among all Central Asian cultures, and are eaten for every meal. The region's tandoor breads are served with tea or yogurt, or used to eat meat dishes by hand. Central Asian nomads, who have limited grain and fuel supply, create thin flatbreads that quickly cook on a griddle. In sedentary settlements of the region, households and bakeries produce thicker, tandoor-baked breads. Some homemade versions are made with milk or yogurt. In Tibet, breads are only found in sedentary communities; they are made of barley. In Uzbekistan, flatbreads are part of the first course of lunch or dinner.

In the Caucasus, flatbreads are typically eaten with every meal. Varieties include lavash in Armenia and khachapuri and shotis puri in Georgia.

=== East and Southeast Asia ===
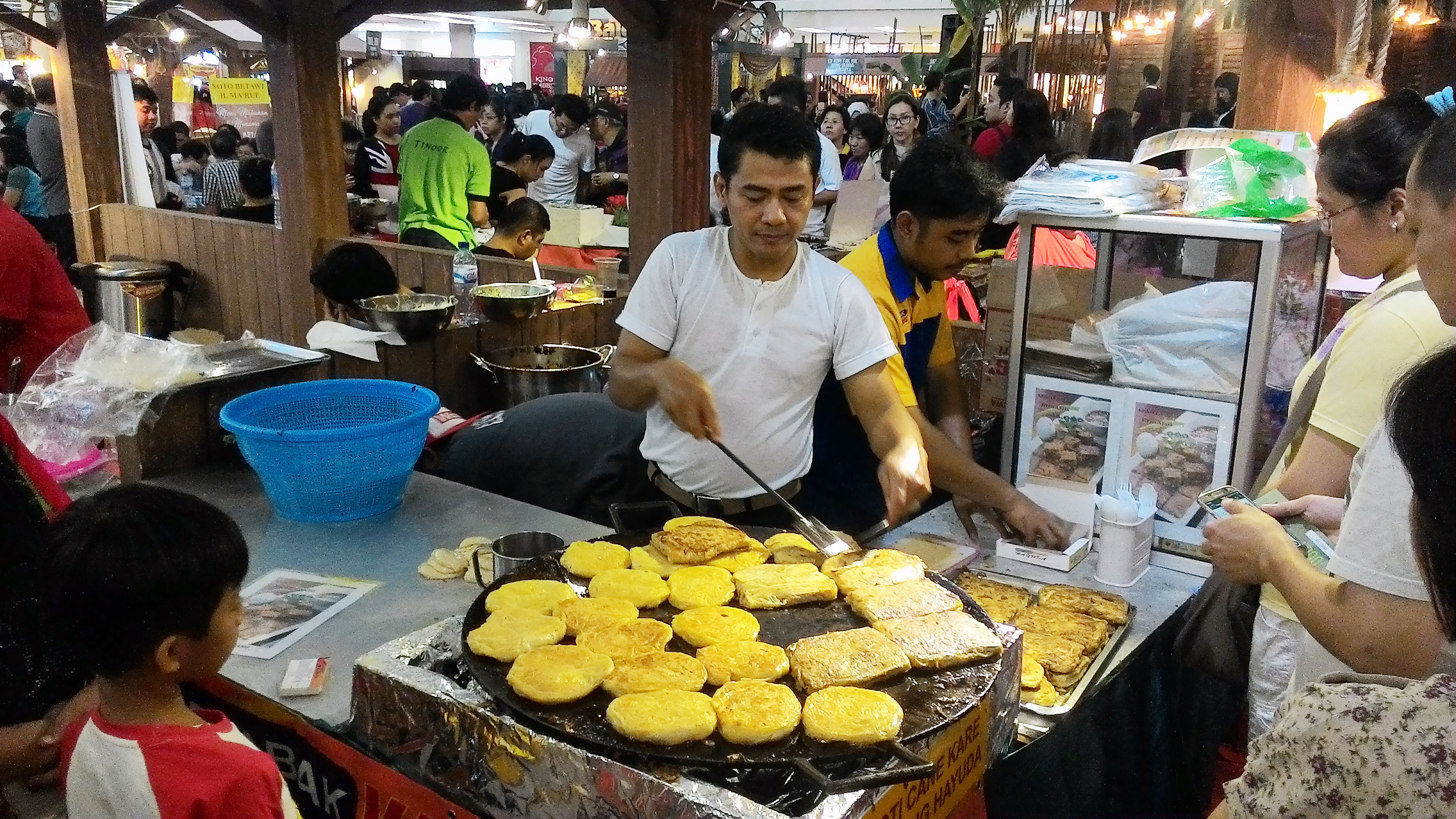
Street vendor preparing murtabak

Wheat is the main staple in parts of China, so it is used for flatbreads and noodles in Northern Chinese and Sichuan cuisine. The region's flatbreads are influenced by those of Central Asia, being similarly baked in tandoors or on griddles, but they are smaller than Central Asian flatbreads as they are a smaller part of the diet. Some Chinese flatbreads have strong flavors, such as sesame, scallions, or Sichuan peppercorn. The thin flatbreads of Northern China are classified as bing. Shaobing is perhaps the most common flatbread in China, though it strongly differs across the country.

In Vietnamese and Malaysian cuisine, plain rice is the main staple, but flatbreads also exist. Vietnam has very thin rice flatbreads, such as bánh ướt, that are wrapped around various combinations of foods. Indian flatbreads are common in the parts of Malaysia and Singapore that have Indian populations, using imported wheat. The Indian-influenced flatbread murtabak is common in many parts of Southeast Asia.

=== Sub-Saharan Africa ===
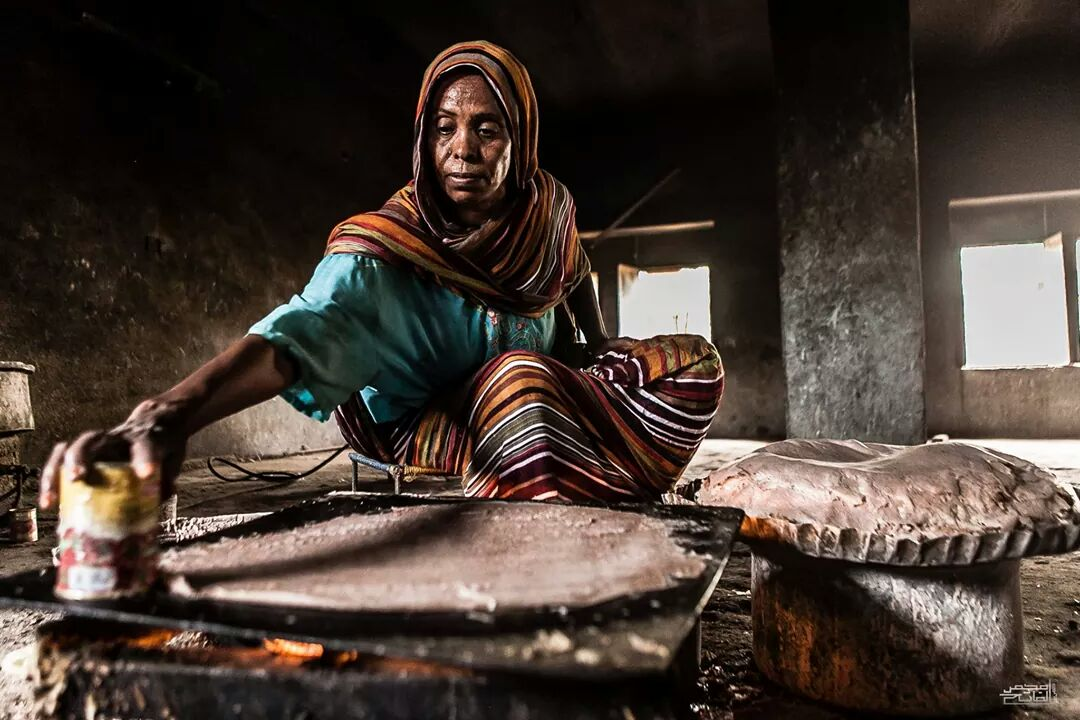
A Sudanese woman making kisra

Africa has many flatbreads. They are staples in some parts of Africa, while porridges are in others, with Northeast Africa (including the Horn of Africa) lying between the bread-eating and porridge-eating regions. Wheat is grown in Southern Africa and the highlands of East Africa, but it is uncommon in many parts of the continent, so other starches are used for flatbreads.

Northeast African flatbreads are pancake-like because local ceral crops, such as teff and sorghum, do not contain gluten. The most common are injera in Ethiopian and Eritrean cuisine and kisra in Sudanese cuisine. The region's flatbreads are eaten with stews and sauces, functioning as a plate and a utensil, and may be eaten for any meal. They are similar to flatbreads from the southern Arabian Peninsula.

Chapati is eaten in most East African countries. It became common in Kenyan cuisine as a result of historical Indian migration to the country.

=== Europe ===
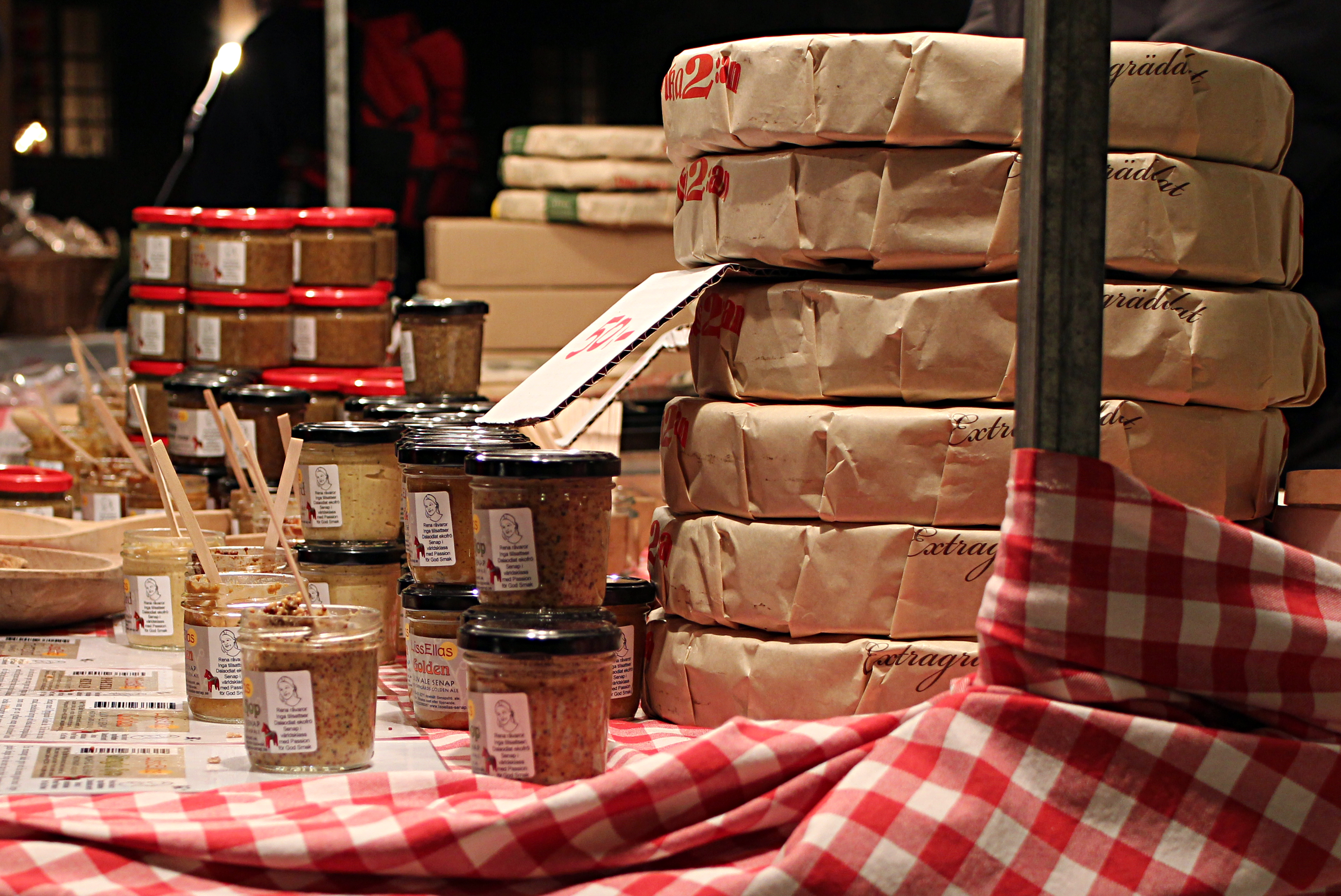
Commercially produced crispbread

Bread in Europe primarily comprises loaf breads, though flatbreads were historically common in some regions. European flatbreads historically used sourdough. Flatbread is rarely served as a main course in European cuisine, but is sometimes part of a starter in an informally served lunch.

Local flatbreads persist in the traditions of some regions of Europe, particularly those that are less wealthy; these include lepinja in Balkan cuisine, pane carasau in Sardinian cuisine, and yufka in the Cappadocia region of Greece. Amid economic development, these have become more homogenous, such as by using high-quality refined flour or using yeast instead of sourdough. Some European flatbreads persist as industrial products, including Scandinavian crispbread, which is now available internationally; Italian piadina, which spread across the country from Romagna; and the oatcake of Scottish cuisine, which is common across the United Kingdom. Pulse flatbreads are almost absent from modern European cuisine, with only a few chickpea-based flatbreads (the Southern French socca and Northern Italian torta di ceci).

Italian cuisine—particularly Sardinian and Sicilian cuisine—has several types of flatbread. These may be baked in domed ovens, as vertical ovens are not typical in the region, while versions in many parts of Italy use a clay griddle called a testo. Double-layered flatbreads are eaten in Sardinian cuisine. Italian flatbreads that were historically eaten as subsistence are now marketed to tourists, such as crescentina at restaurants in the region around Modena.

Flatbreads are present in Northern Europe, including in Scandinavian, Finnish, and Scottish cuisine. These may use barley, oats, or rye, particularly in places where wheat cannot be farmed. Historically, they were baked only a few times per year and dried so that grain supply could last through harsh winters. Scandinavia has crisp flatbreads of wheat, barley, or rye. In addition to these, Norwegian cuisine features the soft flatbread lefse. Scandinavia also has flatbreads made of potato flour.

=== Americas ===
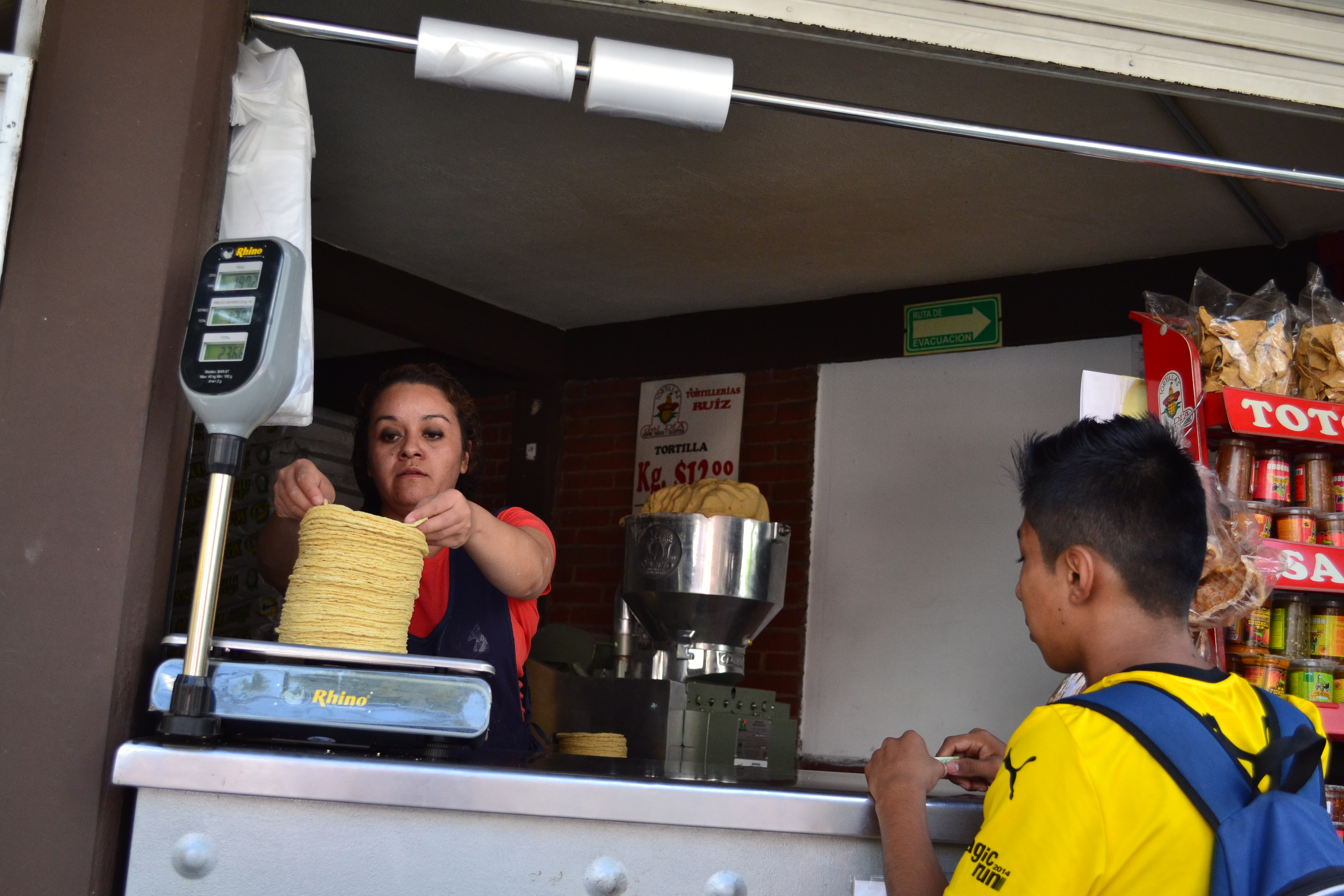
Tortillas being sold at a tortilla bakery in Mexico

Latin American flatbreads are often maize-based, including maize tortillas and arepas. The cuisines of indigenous peoples of North America feature wheat flatbreads, including bannock in Northern Canada (Note: Bannock is also a flatbread from the British Isles, from which the Canadian bannock was derived.) and frybread in regions further south.

Tortillas are eaten by many people every day and span the cuisines of Central America, Mexico, and the Southwestern United States. Tortillas have spread across North America, with their popularity paralleling pan breads in some non-Hispanic households.

As North America has many immigrant communities, many flatbreads have been introduced and adapted. Pizza is one of the most common; others found in the region include chapati, injera, focaccia, lavash, and lefse. As of 2019, North America comprises two-thirds of the commercial flatbread market.

== See also ==
- List of baked goods
- List of breads
- List of ancient dishes
- Steamed bread
- Bread roll
