= Food drying =

Method of food preservation

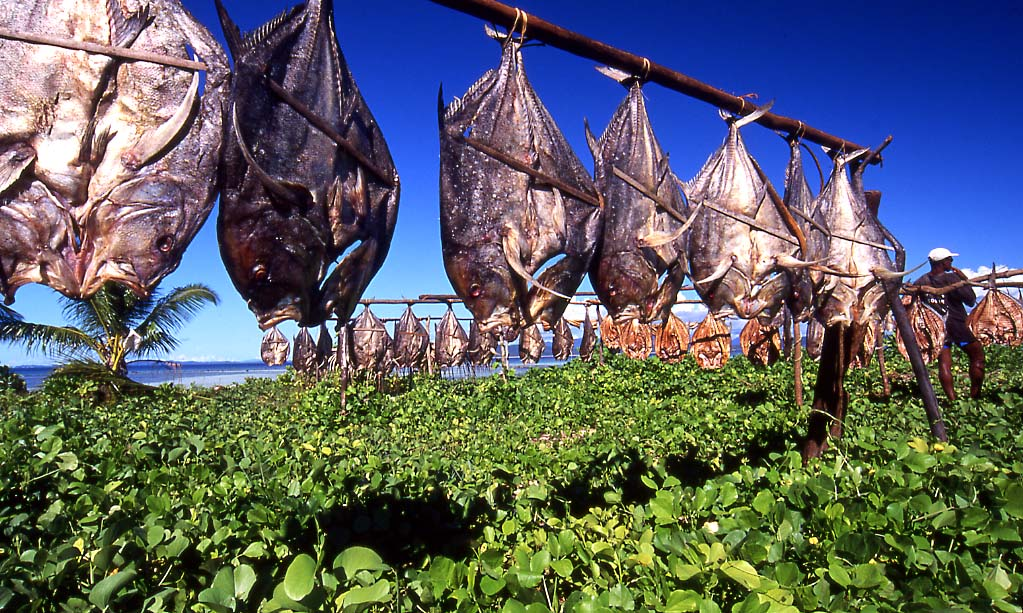
Flattened fish sun-drying in Madagascar. Fish are preserved through such traditional methods as drying, smoking, and salting.

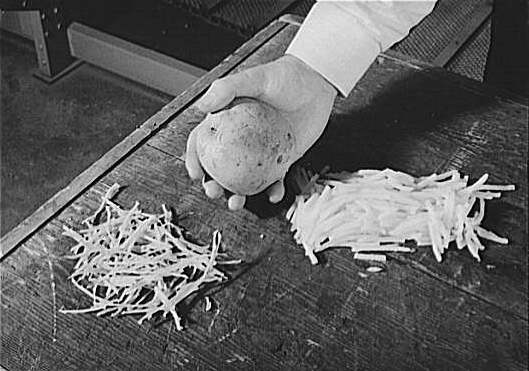
A whole potato, sliced pieces (right), and dried sliced pieces (left), 1943

Food drying is a method of food preservation in which food is dried (dehydrated or desiccated). Drying inhibits the growth of bacteria, yeasts, and mold through the removal of water. Dehydration has been used widely for this purpose since ancient times; the earliest known practice is 12,000 B.C. by inhabitants of the modern Asian and Middle Eastern regions. Water is traditionally removed through evaporation by using methods such as air drying, sun drying, smoking or wind drying, although today electric food dehydrators or freeze-drying can be used to speed the drying process and ensure more consistent results.

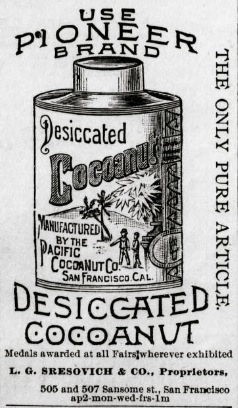
1890 newspaper advertisement showing tin of dried coconut

== Food types ==
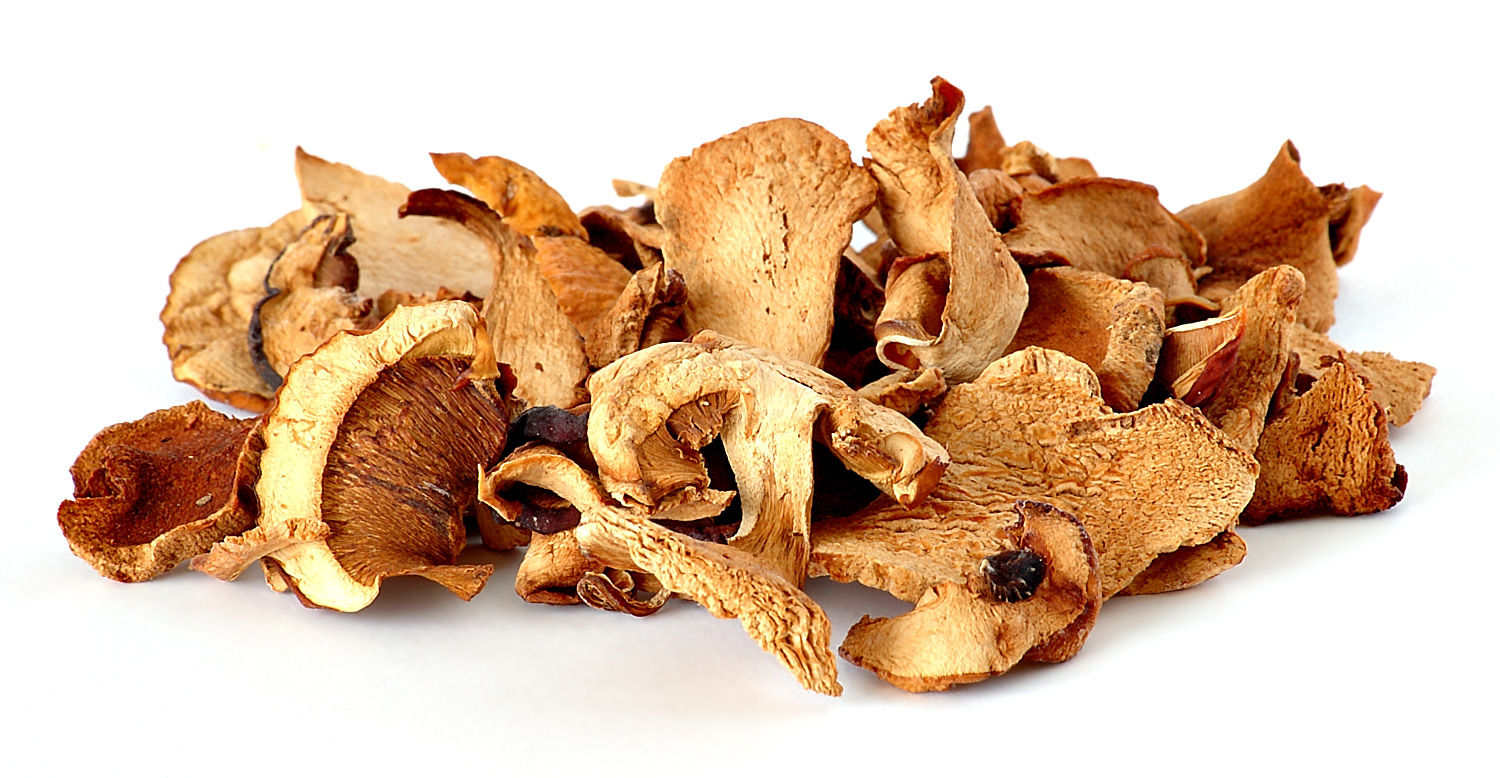
A collection of dried mushrooms

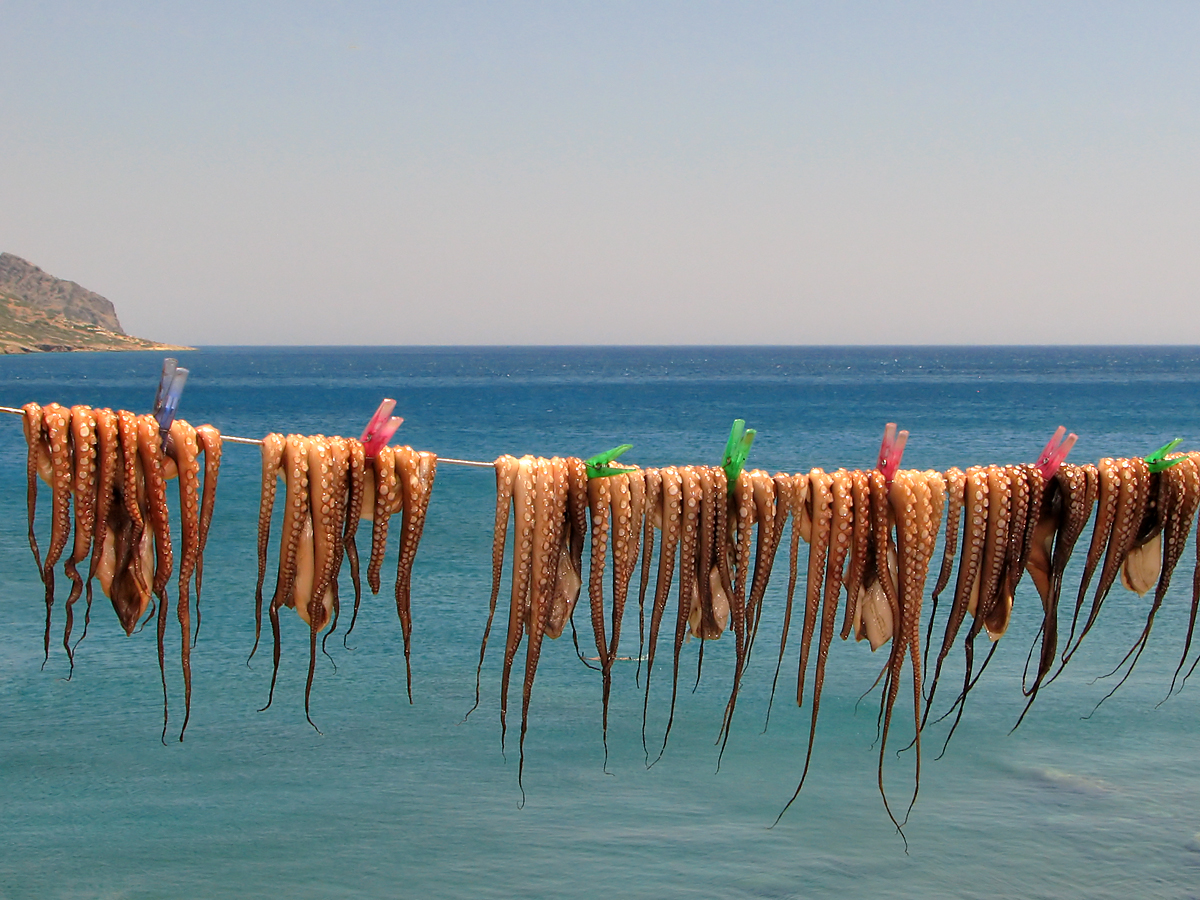
Sun-drying octopus

Many different foods can be prepared by dehydration. Meat has held a historically significant role. For centuries, much of the European diet depended on dried cod—known as salt cod, bacalhau (with salt), or stockfish (without). It formed the main protein source for the slaves on the West Indian plantations, and was a major economic force within the triangular trade. Dried fish most commonly cod or haddock, known as Harðfiskur, is a delicacy in Iceland, while dried reindeer meat is a traditional Sámi food. Dried meats include prosciutto (Parma ham), bresaola, biltong and beef jerky.

Dried fruits have been consumed historically due to their high sugar content and sweet taste, and a longer shelf-life from drying. Fruits may be used and named differently when dried. The plum becomes a prune, the grape a raisin. Figs and dates may be transformed into different products that can either be eaten as they are, used in recipes, or rehydrated.

Freeze-dried vegetables are often found in food for backpackers, hunters, and the military. Garlic and onion are often dried and stored with their stalks braided. Edible mushrooms are sometimes dried for preservation or to be used as seasonings.

== Preparation ==
Home drying of vegetables, fruit and meat can be carried out with electrical dehydrators (household appliances) or by sun-drying or by wind. Preservatives such as potassium metabisulfite, BHA, or BHT may be used, but are not required. However, dried products without these preservatives may require refrigeration or freezing to ensure safe storage for a long time.

Industrial food dehydration is often accomplished by freeze-drying. In this case, food is flash frozen and put into a reduced-pressure system which causes the water to sublimate directly from the solid to the gaseous phase. Although freeze-drying is more expensive than traditional dehydration techniques, it also mitigates the change in flavor, texture, and nutritional value. In addition, another widely used industrial method of drying of food is convective hot air drying. Industrial hot air dryers are simple and easy to design, construct and maintain. More so, it is very affordable and has been reported to retain most of the nutritional properties of food if dried using appropriate drying conditions.

Hurdle technology is the combination of multiple food preservation methods. Hurdle technology uses low doses of multiple food preservation techniques in order to ensure food is not only safe but is desirable visually and texturally.

== Packaging ==
Packaging ensures effective food preservation. Some methods of packaging that are beneficial to dehydrated food are vacuum sealed, inert gases, or gases that help regulate respiration, biological organisms, and growth of microorganisms.

== Other methods ==
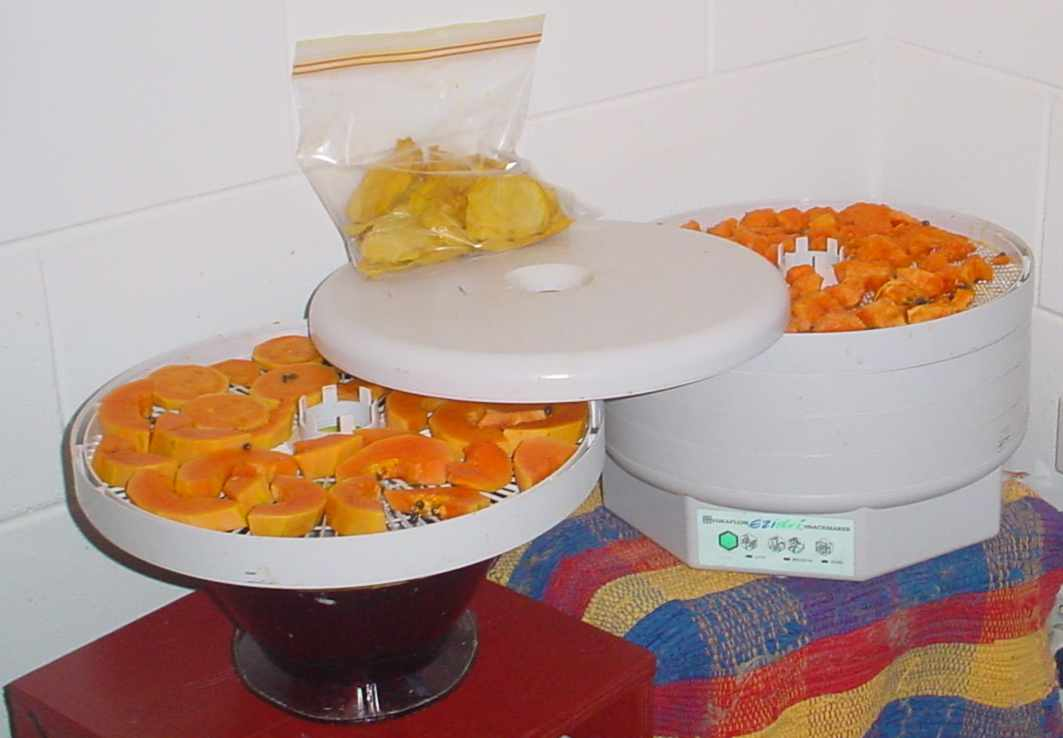
This electric food dehydrator, shown drying mango and papaya slices, has a hot air blower that blows air through food-laden trays.

There are many different methods for drying, each with its own advantages for particular applications. These include:

- Convection drying
- Bed dryers
- Drum drying
- Freeze drying
- Microwave-vacuum drying
- Refractance window drying
- Shelf dryers
- Spray drying
- Infrared radiation drying
- Combined thermal hybrid drying
- Sunlight
- Commercial food dehydrators
- Household oven

== See also ==
- Bouillon cube
- Curing
- Dried fruit
- Instant noodles
- Instant soup
- List of dried foods
- List of smoked foods
- Meat extract
- Water activity
