= Mamuang kuan =

Thai preserved mango

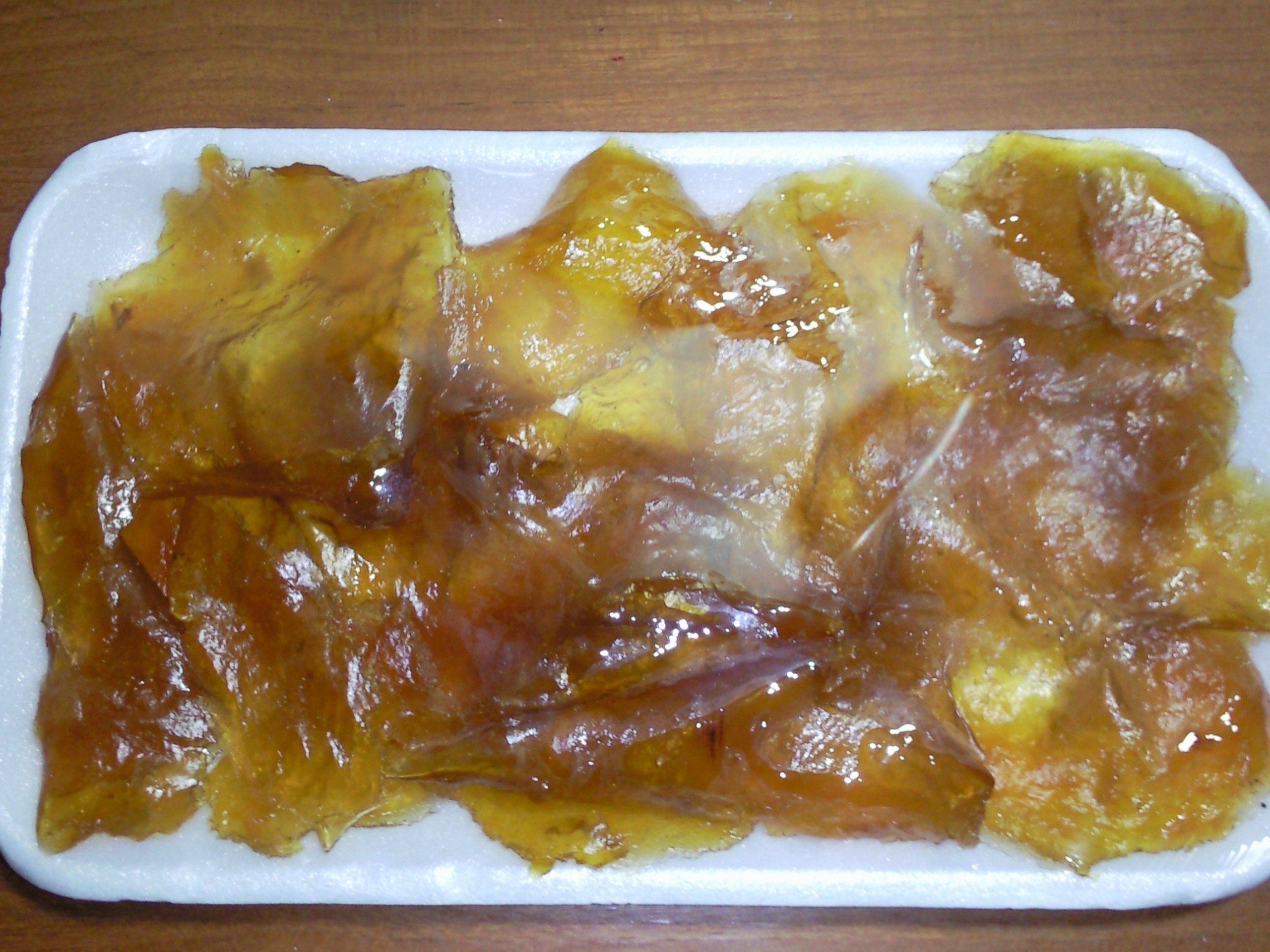
- A package of mamuang kuan
- Alternative names: Mango sheet, mango jelly
- Course: Snack
- Place of origin: Thailand
- Created by: People in Ayutthaya period
- Serving temperature: At room temperature
- Main ingredients: Mango

Mamuang kuan (Thai: มะม่วงกวน, Thai pronunciation: [mā.mûaŋ kūan]), also referred to as preserved mango or mango leather, is a traditional Thai sweet. It is a preparation of dried mango in fruit leather form.

Mamuang kuan is slender and delicate, offering a chewy and soft texture, and golden color. It tastes sweet-and-sour. People sometimes prepare it as a circle, flower, or spiral. It is prepared by slow-cooking mango with sugar and salt, and optionally coconut milk. Traditionally, the mango is then sun-dried for multiple days, but this may be accelerated with a conventional oven. Farmers often make mamuang kuan from fallen mangoes that would otherwise not make it to the market.
