= Dried fruit =

Fruit preserved by removing most moisture

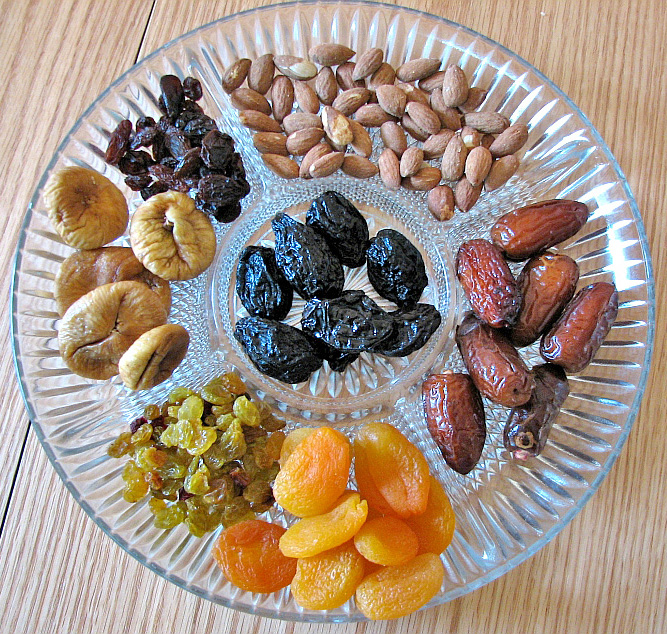
- Dried fruit and nuts on a platter
- Origin: Mediterranean, Mesopotamia, India
- Use: Preservation of fruit for use as food
- Production: Earliest: dates and raisins

Dried fruit is fruit from which the majority of the original water content has been removed prior to cooking or being eaten on its own. Drying may occur either naturally, by sun, through the use of industrial dehydrators, or by freeze drying. Dried fruit has a long tradition of use dating to the fourth millennium BC in Mesopotamia, and is valued for its sweet taste, nutritional content, and long shelf life.

In the 21st century, dried fruit consumption is widespread worldwide. Nearly half of dried fruits sold are raisins, followed by dates, prunes, figs, apricots, peaches, apples, and pears. These are referred to as "conventional" or "traditional" dried fruits: fruits that have been dried in the sun or in commercial dryers. Many fruits, such as cranberries, blueberries, cherries, strawberries, and mango are infused with a sweetener (e.g., sucrose syrup) prior to drying. Some products sold as dried fruit, like papaya, kiwifruit and pineapple, are most often candied fruit.

== History ==
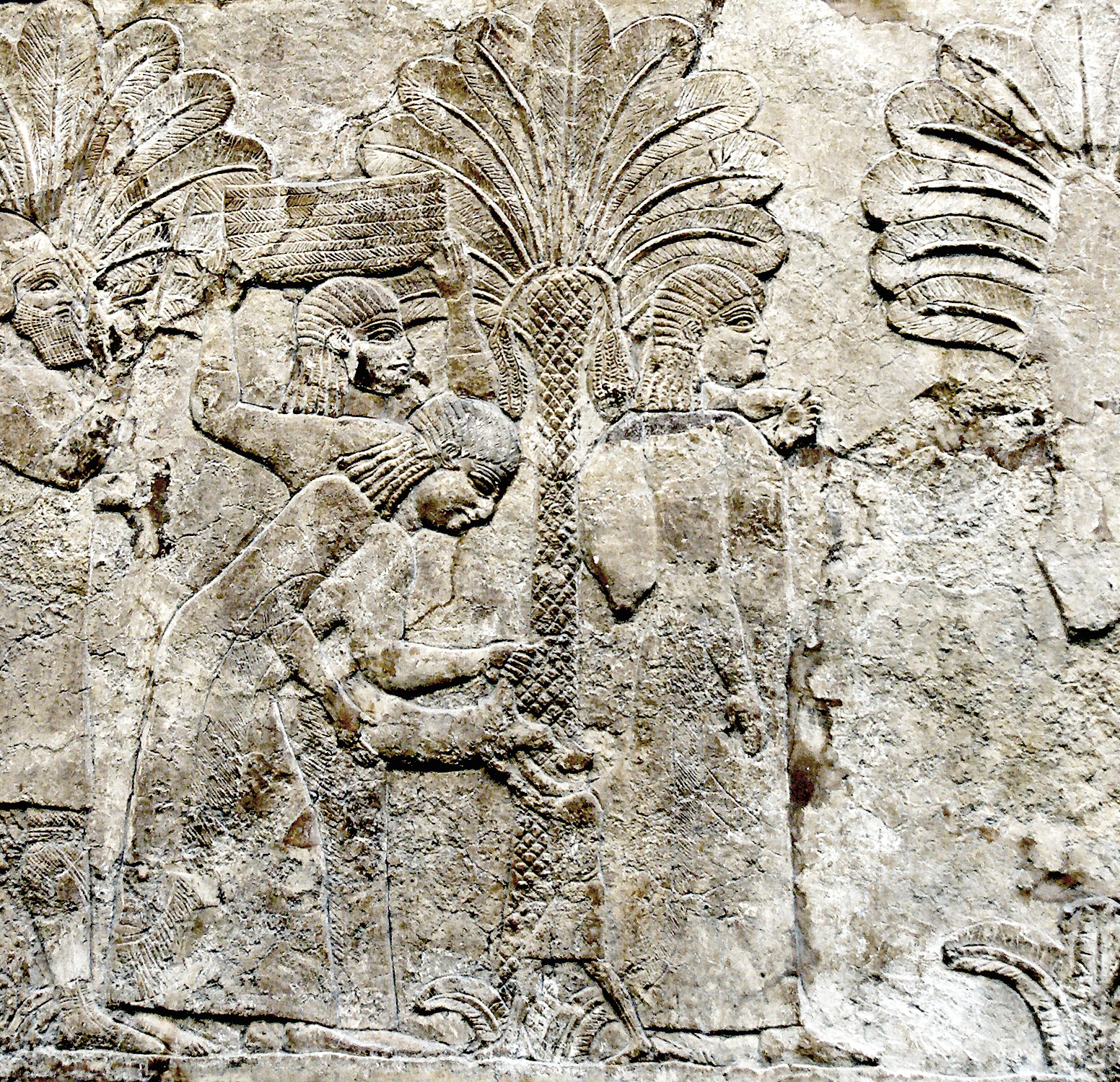
Nineveh: Procession through groves of date palms, one of the world's first cultivated trees

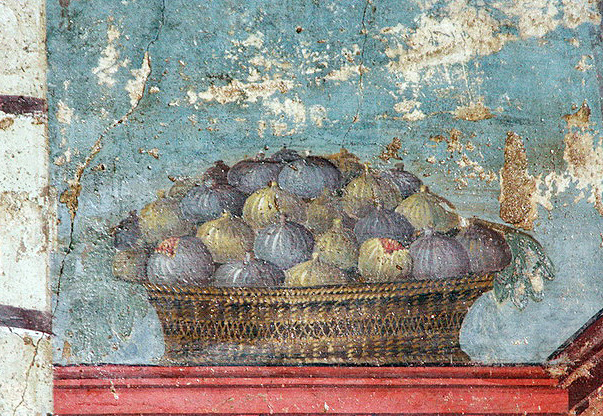
Figs in a basket, Pompeii. Dried figs were consumed in ancient Rome

Traditional dried fruits such as raisins, figs, dates, apricots, and apples have been a staple of Mediterranean diets for millennia. This is due partly to their early cultivation in the Middle Eastern region known as the Fertile Crescent, made up of parts of modern Iran, Iraq, southwest Turkey, Syria, Lebanon, Palestine, and northern Egypt. Drying or dehydration was the earliest form of food preservation: figs, dates or grapes which fell from the plant and were sun-dried may have been consumed by early hunter-gatherers as edible and more long-lasting and sweeter.

Having dried fruits was essential in ancient Rome as these instructions for housekeepers around 100 BC tell: "She must keep a supply of cooked food on hand for you and the servants. She must keep many hens and have plenty of eggs. She must have a large store of dried pears, sorbs, figs, raisins, sorbs in must, preserved pears, grapes, and quinces. She must also keep preserved grapes in grape pulp and in pots buried in the ground, as well as fresh Praenestine nuts kept in the same way, and Scantian quinces in jars, and other fruits that are usually preserved, as well as wild fruits. All these she must store away diligently every year."

Dried figs were added to bread and formed a major part of the winter food of common people. They were rubbed with spices such as cumin, anise, fennel seeds or toasted sesame, wrapped in fig leaves and stored in jars.

Plums, apricots and peaches have their origins in Asia. They were domesticated in China in the 3 BC and spread to the Fertile Crescent where they were commonly eaten.

== Preparation and use ==
Fruits can be dried whole (e.g., grapes, berries, apricot, plum), in halves, or as slices (e.g., mango, papaya, kiwi). Alternatively, they can be chopped after drying (e.g., dates), made into pastes, or concentrated juices. The residual moisture content can vary from small (3–8%) to substantial (16–18%), depending on the type of fruit. Fruits can also be spread out, dried and cut into strips in its puree form without the addition of sugar or fats with at least 50% moisture content as fruit leather, (see patent listed under the references section) or as a powder by spray or drum drying. They can be freeze dried. Fresh fruit is frozen and placed in a drying chamber under a vacuum. Heat is applied, and water evaporates from the fruit while it is still frozen. The fruit becomes very light and crispy and retains much of its original flavor. Dried fruit is widely used by the confectionery, baking, and sweets industries. Food manufacturing plants use dried fruits in various sauces, soups, marinades, garnishes, puddings, and food for infants and children.

As ingredients in prepared food, dried fruit juices, purées, and pastes impart sensory and functional characteristics to recipes:

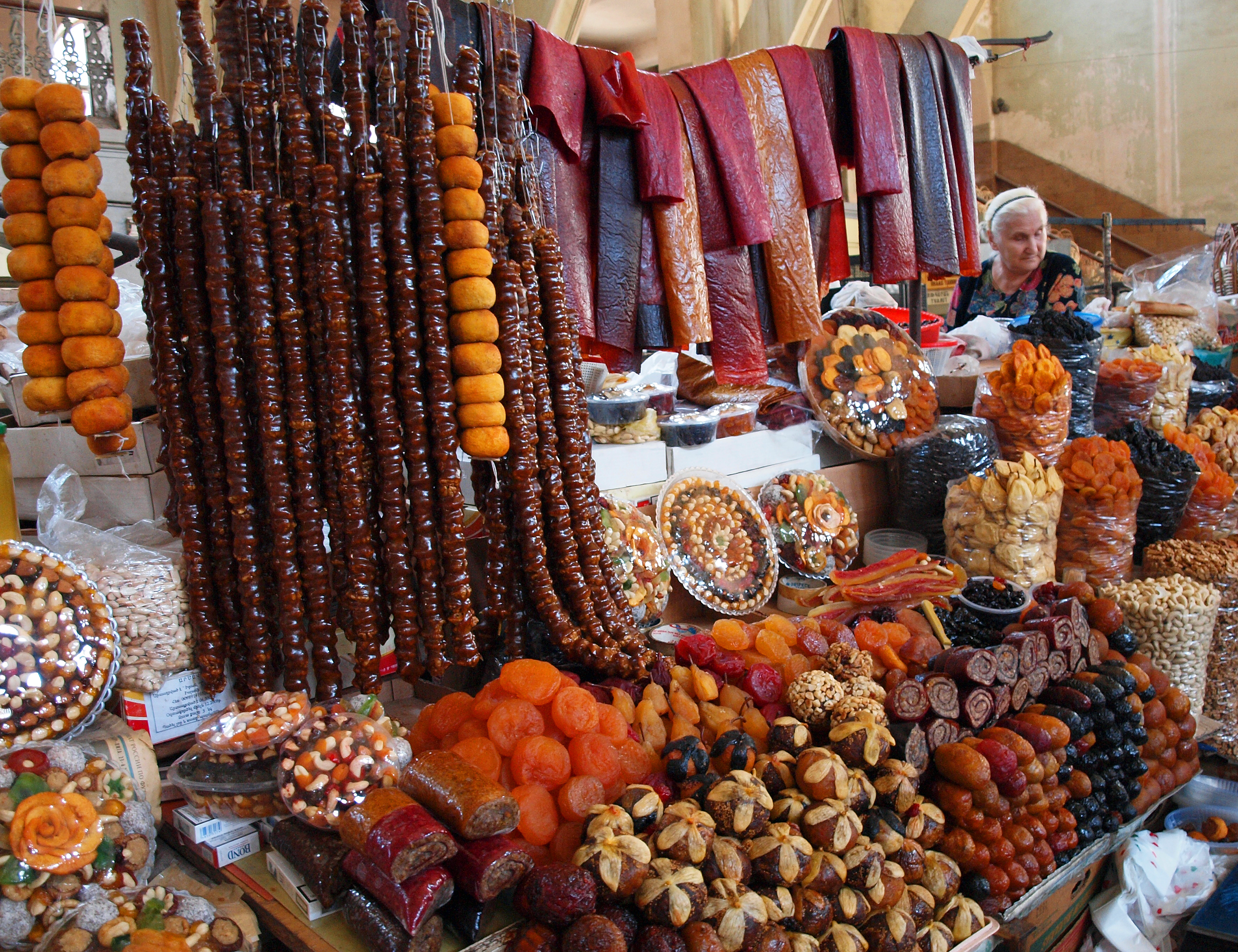
Dozens of types of dried fruit and fruit leather at a market in Yerevan

- The high fiber content provides water-absorbing and water-binding capabilities.
- Organic acids such as sorbitol act as humectants, provide dough and batter stability, and control water activity.
- Fruit sugars add sweetness, humectancy, and surface browning, and control water activity.
- Fruit acids, such as malic acid and tartaric acid, contribute to flavor enhancement.

The high drying and processing temperatures, the intrinsic low pH of the fruit, and the low water activity (moisture content) in dried fruit make them a stable food.

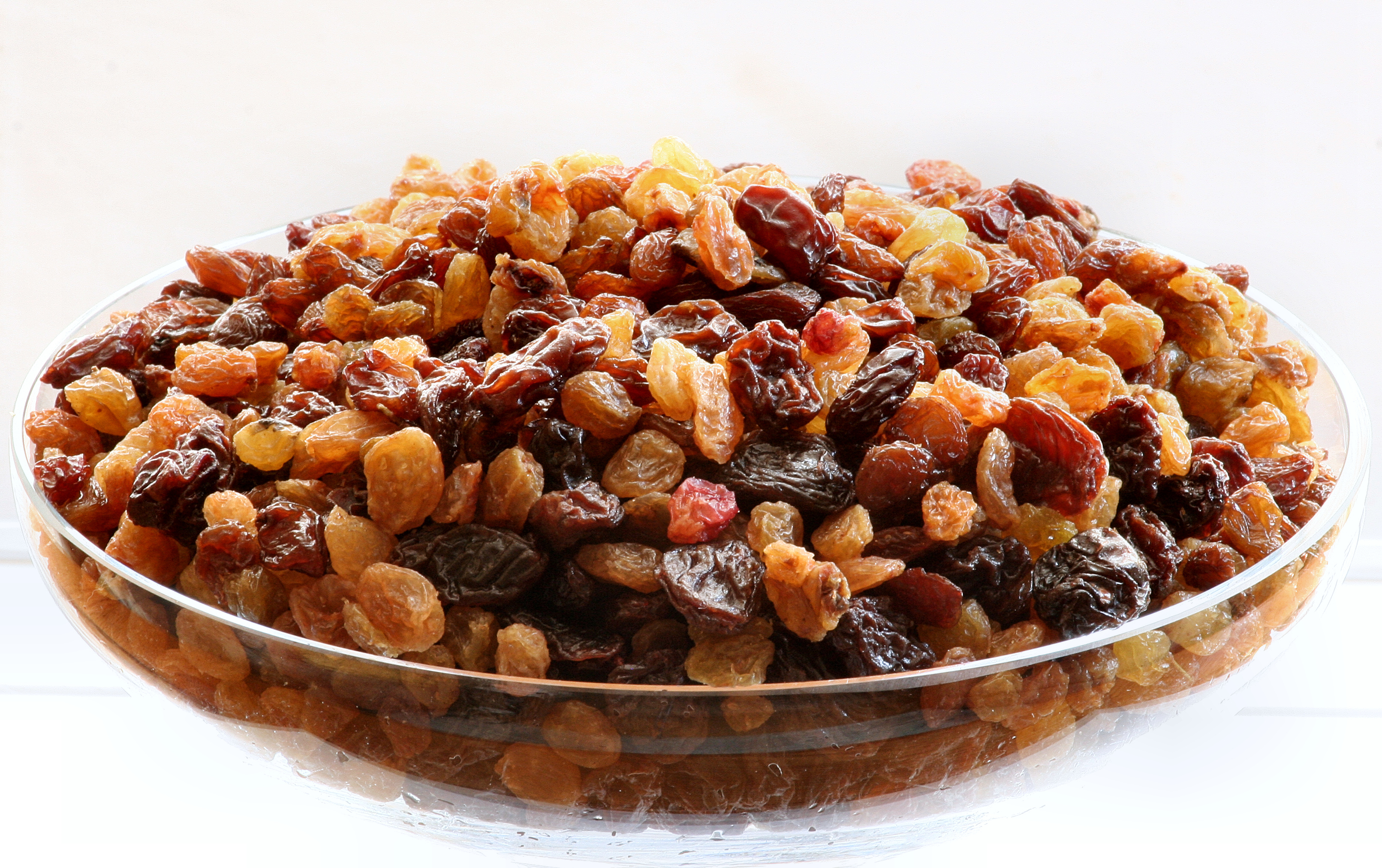
Both golden and conventional raisins are made from the same grape. Golden raisins are treated with sulfur dioxide.

Sulfur dioxide is used as an antioxidant in some dried fruits to protect their color and flavor. For example, in golden raisins, dried peaches, apples, and apricots, sulfur dioxide is used to keep them from losing their light color by blocking browning reactions that darken fruit and alter their flavor. Over the years, sulfur dioxide and sulfites have been used by many populations for a variety of purposes. Sulfur dioxide was first employed as a food additive in 1664, and was later approved for such use in the United States as far back as the 1800s.

Sulfur dioxide, while harmless to healthy individuals, can induce asthma when inhaled or ingested by sensitive people. The U.S. Food and Drug Administration (FDA) estimates that one out of every hundred people is sulfite-sensitive, and about 5% of asthmatics are also at risk of suffering an adverse reaction. Given that about 10% of the population has asthma, this figure translates to 0.5% of the whole population with potential for sulfite-sensitivity. These individuals make up the subgroup of greatest concern and are largely aware of the need to avoid sulfite-containing foods. Consequently, the FDA requires food manufacturers and processors to disclose the presence of sulfiting agents in concentrations of at least 10 parts per million.

In Taipei, Taiwan, a 2010 city health survey found one-third of tested dried fruit products failed health standard tests, most having excessive amounts of sodium cyclamate, some at levels 20 times higher than the legal limit.

Turkey exported 1.5 billion dollars' worth of dried fruit in 2021 and became the world's largest exporter of dried fruit.

== Health ==
=== Glycemic index ===
Glycemic index of different dried fruits
Fruit	Glycemic index
Dates (brand or variety not specified)	62
Dried apples (brand not specified)	29
Dried apricots (brand not specified)	30
Dried peaches	35
Dried plums (Sun Sweet)	29
Figs (Dessert Maid)	61
Raisins (Sun-Maid)	54

Traditional dried fruit has a low to moderate glycemic index (GI), a measure of how a food affects blood sugar levels. GI measures an individual's response to eating a carbohydrate-containing food (usually 50 grams of available carbohydrates) compared to the individual's response to the same amount of carbohydrates from either white bread or glucose. Carbohydrate-containing foods are classified as high (above 70), moderate (56–69), or low (0–55) GI. Foods with high fiber content generally have a low GI. However, other factors also contribute to a food's glycemic response, such as the type of carbohydrate or sugar present, the physical characteristics of the food matrix, and the presence of organic acids. All studies assessing the GI of dried fruit show that they are low- to moderate-GI foods and that the insulin response is proportional to their GI. Factors thought to contribute to this glycemic response include the viscous texture of dried fruits when chewed, their whole food matrix, the presence of phenolic compounds and organic acids and the type of sugar present (about 50% fructose in most traditional dried fruit).

=== Research ===
Consumption of dried fruit is under preliminary research for the potential to improve nutrition and affect chronic diseases.

== Dehydration methods ==
People have practiced food preservation since ancient times. Many folktales describe ways of preserving foods in one way or another according to local and cultural traditions. Dehydration methods help to prevent food from spoilage and to maintain it for a longer period of time while keeping it suitable for consumption. Reducing the amount of water in fruits helps prevent growth of bacteria, yeast or fungi. There are several processes that can be used in the production of dried fruit, each of which affects its appearance, rehydration properties, and nutrients differently. These drying processes include sun drying, tray (air) drying, freeze drying, and vacuum microwave drying. Each process has advantages and disadvantages.

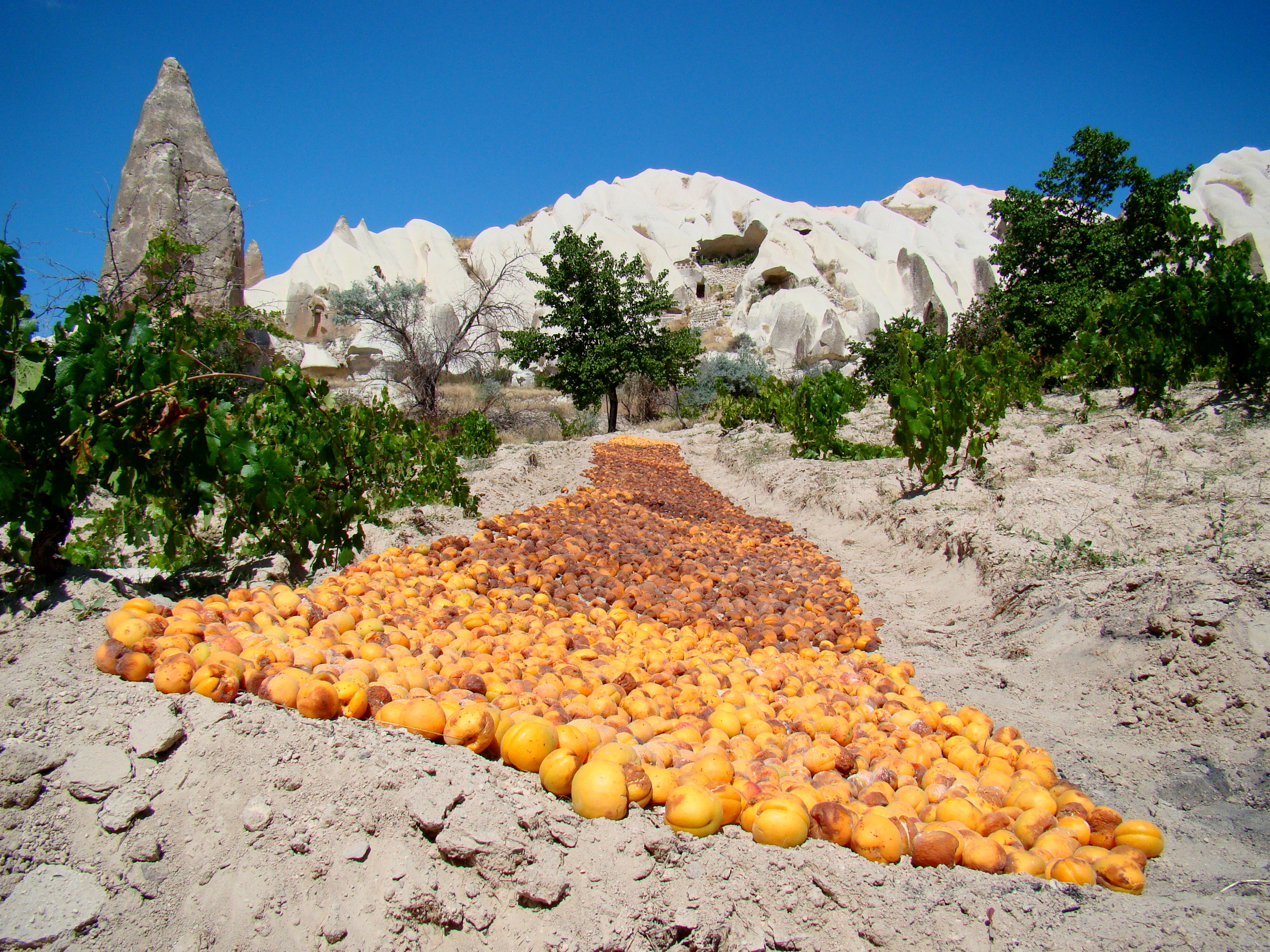
Apricots drying in the sun in a mountain-slope orchard of Turkey

=== Sun drying ===
This process uses sun exposure as its thermal source, combined with natural airflow. It is also a traditional drying method to reduce the moisture of fruits by spreading them under the sun. Warmer temperatures evaporate the moisture, and lower humidity allows moisture to move quickly from the fruit to the air. However, there are many disadvantages associated with it, such as the longer time required to dry, the hot climate and daylight, and risk of invasion by animals and unwanted microorganisms.

=== Tray drying ===
A tray dryer is similar to a convection drier, which is placed in enclosed, insulated chambers and trays on top of each other in the tray. Input materials are batch-fed, placed in trays, and loaded into ovens for drying. Dryers are used in processing where drying and heating are important parts of the industrial manufacturing process, like dried fruits. Tray drying means dehydrating small pieces of fruit from a source of hot, dry air or the sun until they are dry enough to store at ambient temperature with minimal spoilage. Despite its poor re-hydration properties and shrunken appearance, this process requires a short period of time along with controlled humidity and heated air.

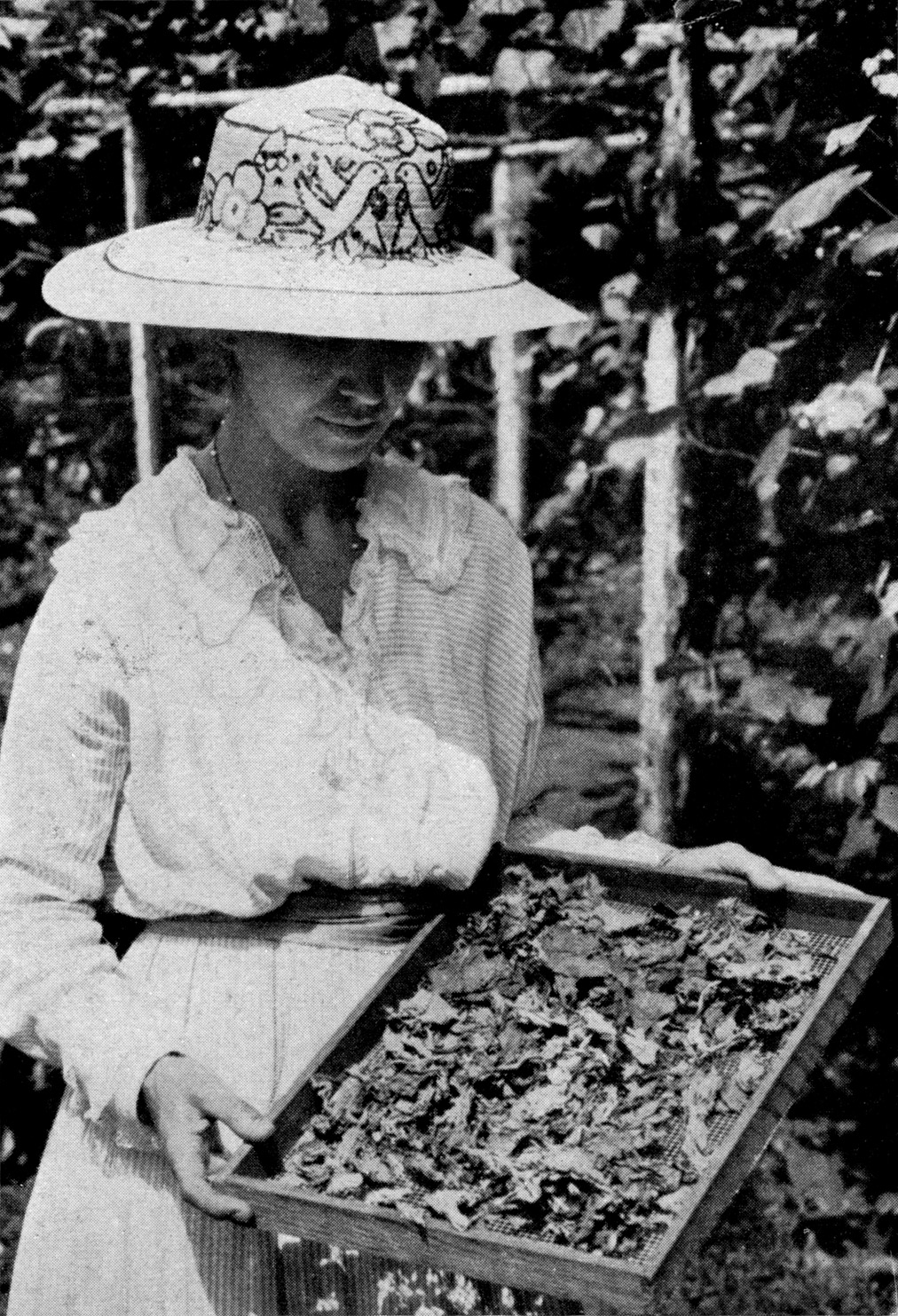
Tray Drying

=== Freeze drying ===
Freeze drying is a special form of drying that removes all moisture and has less effect on the taste of food than normal dehydration. Freeze drying is a water removal process commonly used to preserve raw plant foods. The food is placed in a vacuum chamber at low heat to increase shelf life. This process works by freezing the material, then reducing the pressure and adding heat to neutralize the frozen water in the material. It may be spray-dried to produce a versatile powder for ingredient applications.

Unlike the other drying methods, this method allows a dried plant food to retain its shape, retain the highest color value, and provide a rehydration property. Foods that contain adequate amounts of water are easy to work with and maintain their initial shape after the freeze-drying process is complete.

=== Microwave vacuum drying ===
The microwave generates a specific amount of energy, shortening the drying time. In addition, the boiling point of water is lowered under vacuum, causing a high temperature inside the dried particles on the surface of the product. Microwave vacuum drying is a dehydration process that uses microwave radiation to generate heat at full pressure (chamber pressure). During vacuum drying, high-energy water molecules propagate to the surface and evaporate due to low pressure.

Due to the absence of air, vacuum drying inhibits oxidation and maintains the color, texture, and taste of dried products. This device can improve the quality of products, and the equipment can prolong the shelf life of food, preserve the original taste and nutrients of food, maintain the physical activity of raw materials, enhance the function of healthy food, and increase the value of agricultural products. This method provides flavor retention, rehydration potential, and little color change compared to other thermal drying methods, along with a faster drying rate compared to freeze drying.

== In culture ==
Dried fruit are used on festive occasions by many cultures.

In the Middle East it is customary to serve trays with mixed kinds of dried fruit for the Iftar meal that breaks the fast days during Ramadan. They are sometimes soaked in water beforehand.

On the Jewish holiday of Tu BiShvat, it is customary to eat dried fruit. This tradition originates from the practice of eating fruits from the Land of Israel/Palestine, particularly the Seven Species, such as grapes, dates, and figs. Before the 20th century, most Jews lived in Europe, where, without modern technology, obtaining these fruits fresh was impossible, so they were typically consumed in their dried form.

== Gallery ==
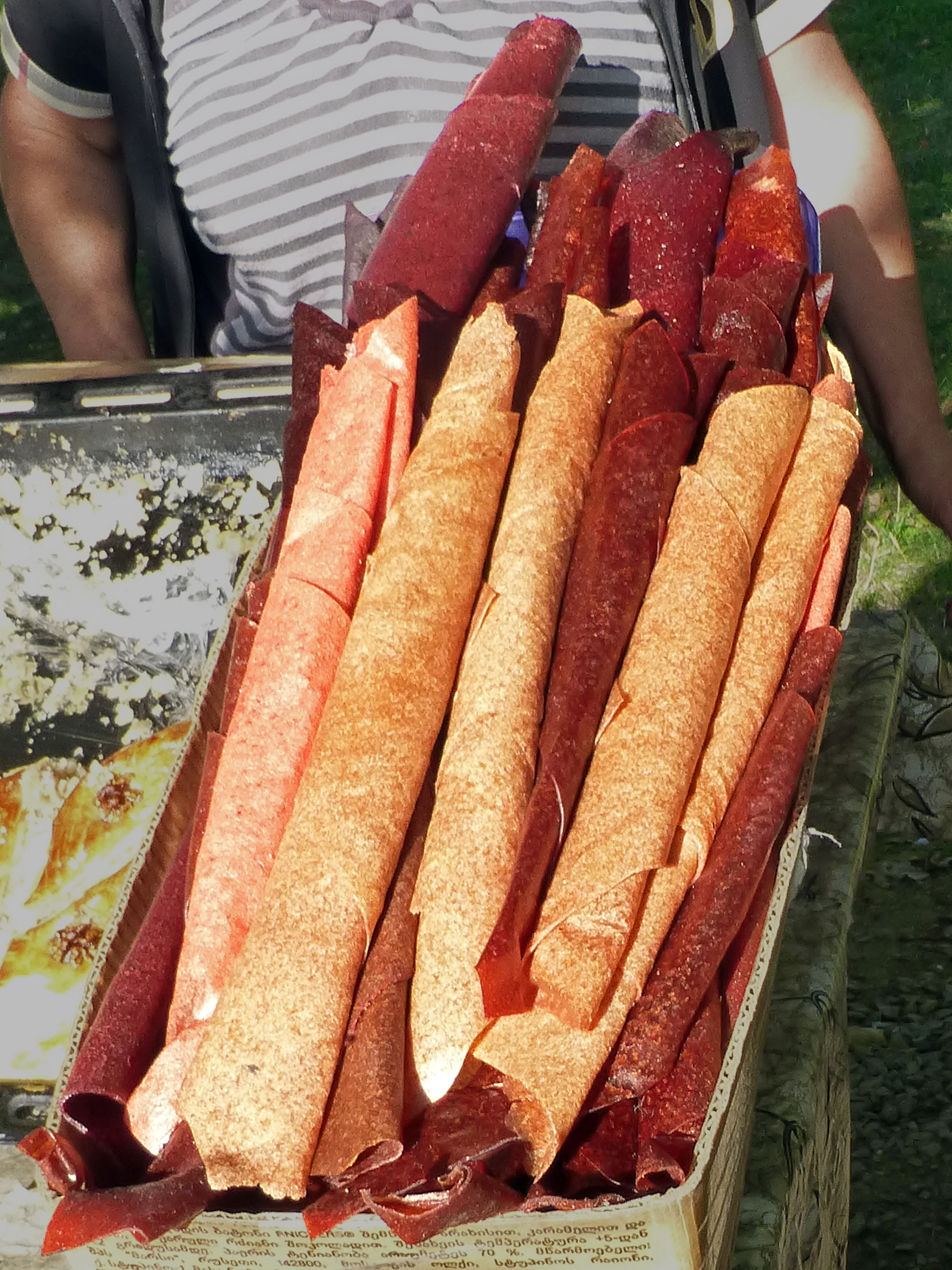
Fruit leather

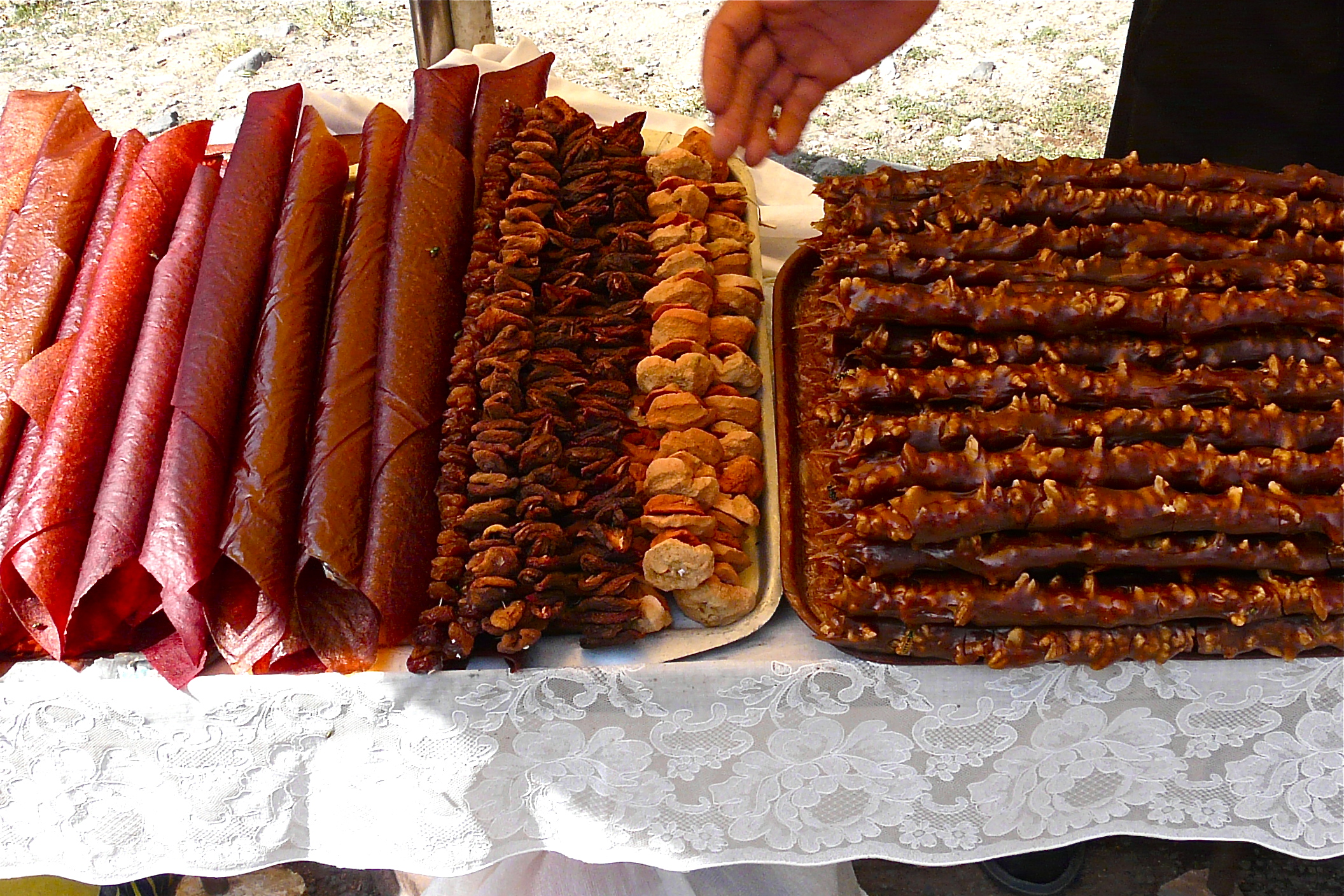
Dried fruit and fruit leather

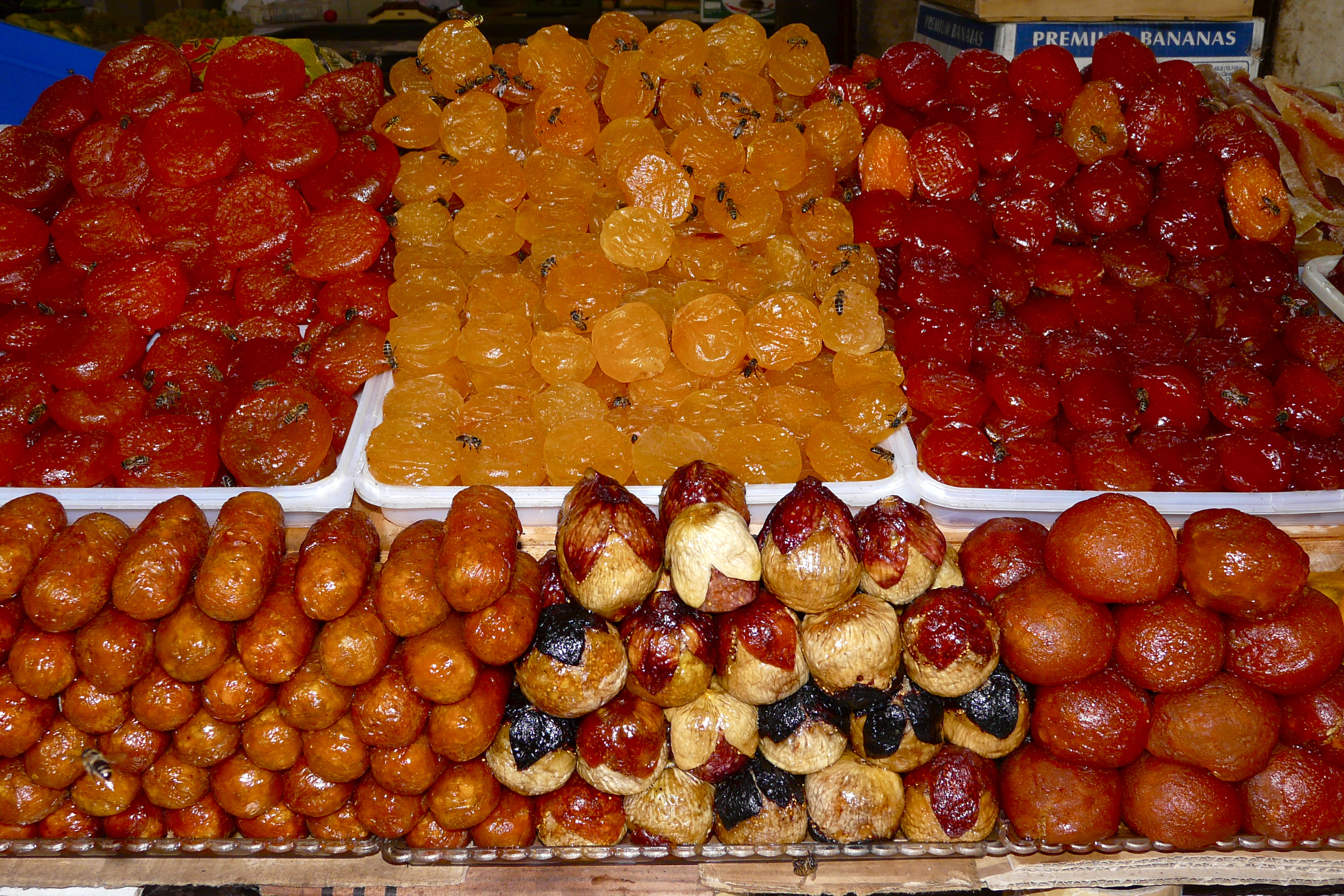
Dried fruits for sale at a market

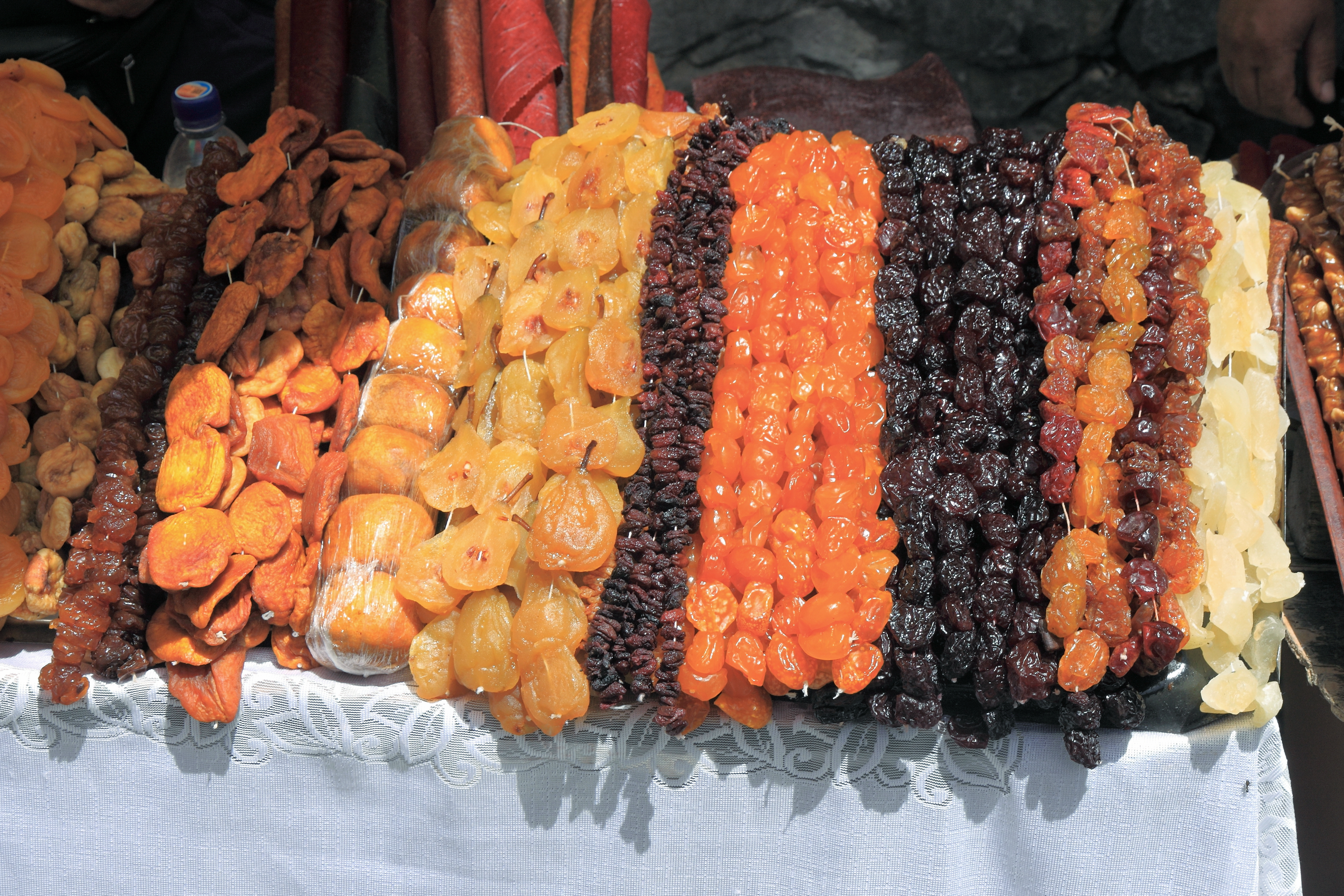
Dried fruits for sale

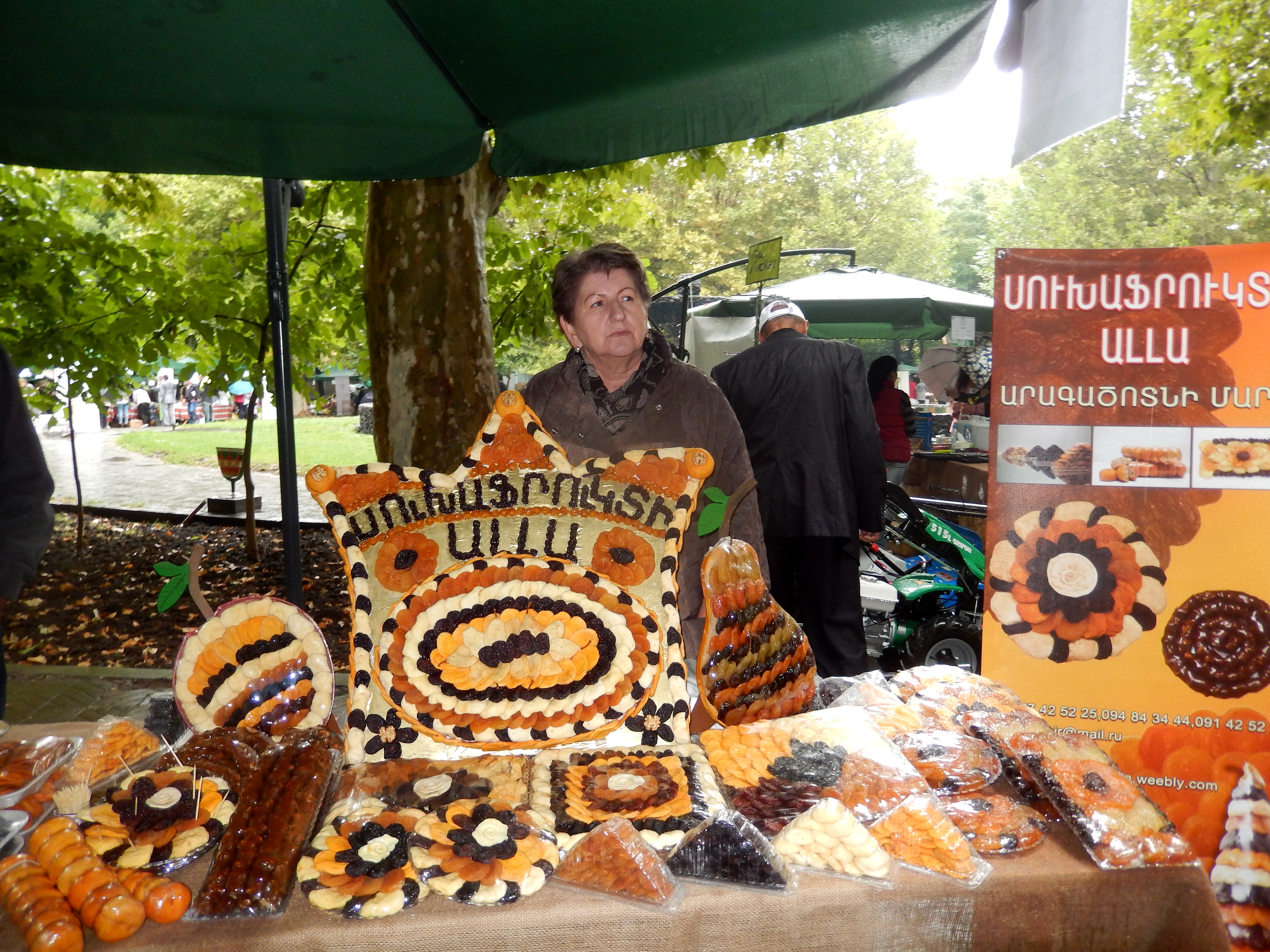
A dry fruit seller in Armenia

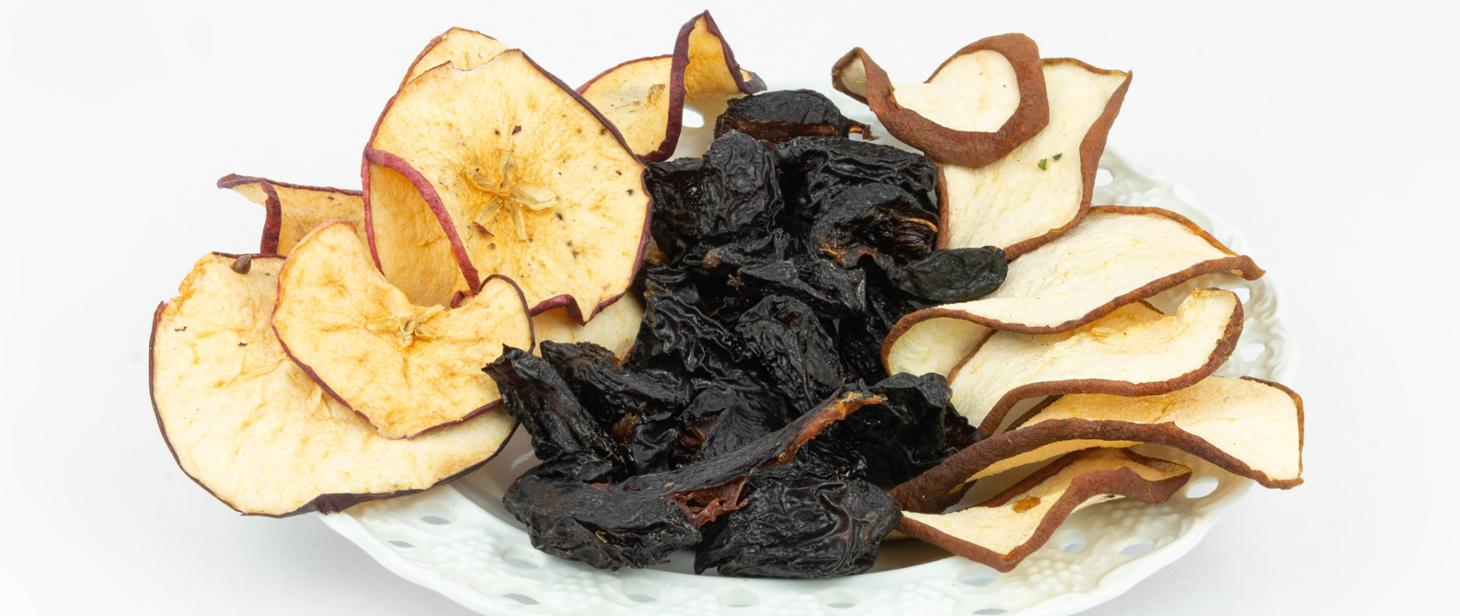
Dried apples, pears and plums – a traditional product of Poland, used, for example, to prepare Christmas compote

== See also ==
- List of dried foods
- List of snack foods
