= Refractance window drying =

Food drying with hot water

Refractance window drying (RWD) is a drying technique which uses infrared light to dry food or pharmaceuticals to reduce losses of temperature sensitive and volatile compounds.

The nutrient retention in RWD products is comparable to freeze-dried or even fresh produce, while offering greater energy efficiency to other food drying techniques. However, RWD is not suited for large-scale production as the conveyor belt thickness is a compromise between thermal conductivity and mechanical strength.

== Mechanism ==
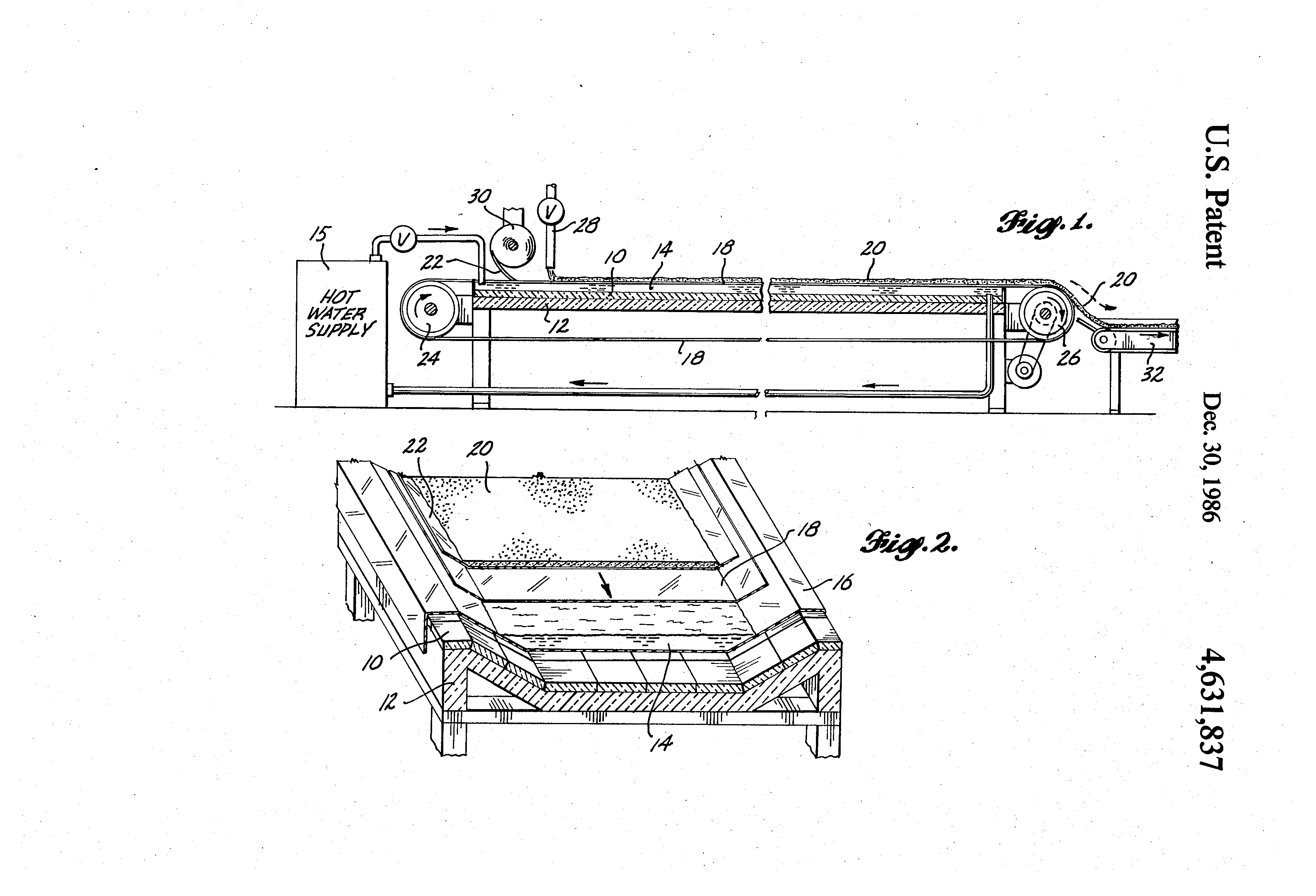
The figures from patent US4631837, showing the conveyor belt (18) floating on and covering the heated water (14).

The material to be dried is placed on a conveyor belt made of an infrared-transparent plastic, such as Mylar. The conveyor belt covers a reservoir of heated water.

Where moist material contacts the Mylar film, an 'infrared window' is created. This allows infrared light to pass from the hot water to the moist material. Since the window requires moisture, it closes as the material dries, limiting the temperature to about 75°C.

RWD boasts the use of three modes of heat transfer (convection in the water, conduction through the conveyor belt and radiation through the Mylar).
