= Drying =

Removal of water or another solvent by evaporation from a solid, semi-solid or liquid

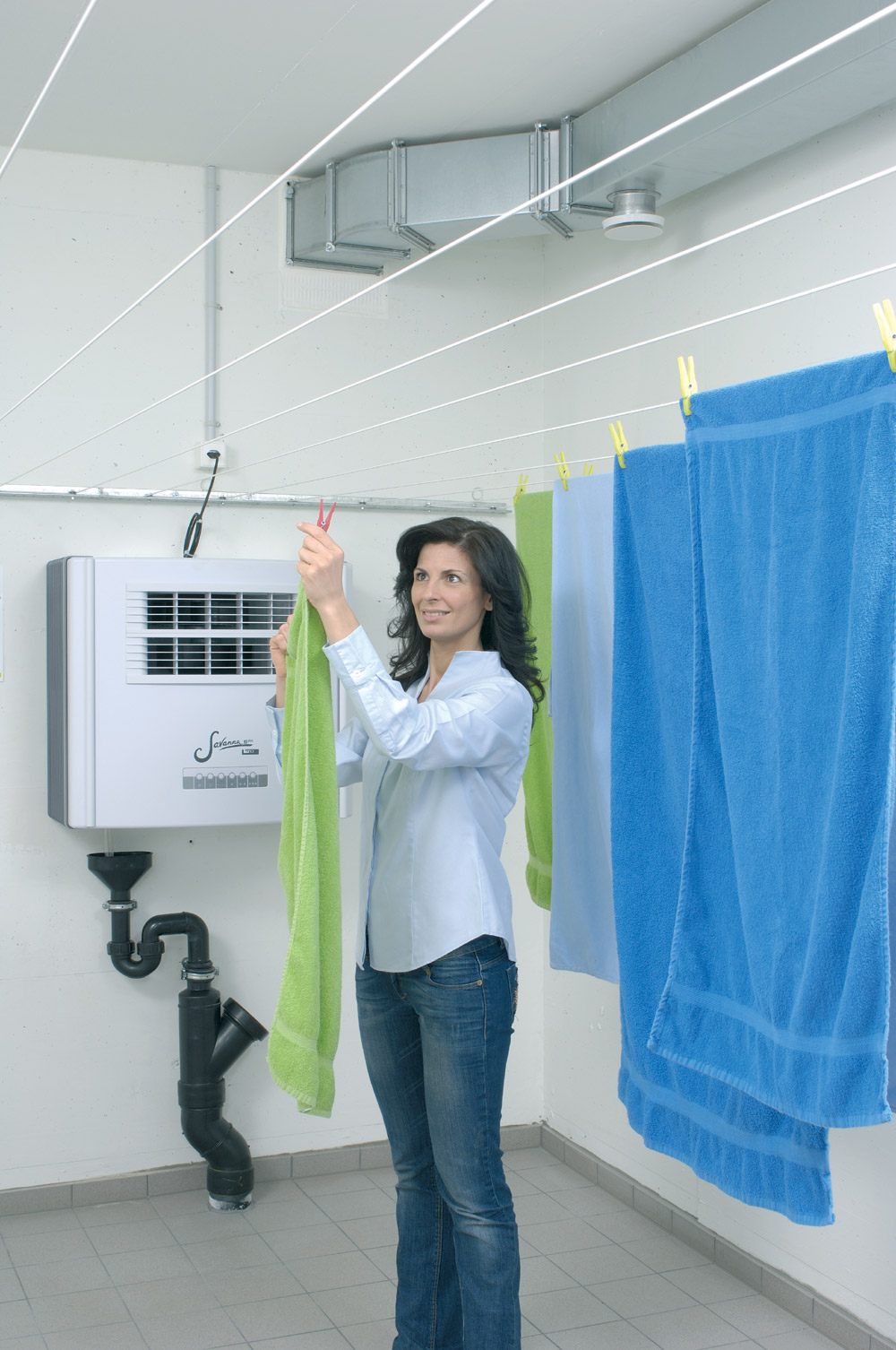
Laundry hung on a clothes line in a drying room (dehumidifier in the background and duct for ventilation in the ceiling)

Drying is a mass transfer process consisting of the removal of water or another solvent by evaporation from a solid, semi-solid or liquid. This process is often used as a final production step before selling or packaging products. To be considered "dried", the final product must be solid, in the form of a continuous sheet (e.g., paper), long pieces (e.g., wood), particles (e.g., cereal grains or corn flakes) or powder (e.g., sand, salt, washing powder, milk powder). A source of heat and an agent to remove the vapor produced by the process are often involved. In bioproducts like food, grains, and pharmaceuticals like vaccines, the solvent to be removed is almost invariably water. Desiccation may be synonymous with drying or considered an extreme form of drying.

In the most common case, a gas stream, e.g., air, applies the heat by convection and carries away the vapor as humidity. Other possibilities are vacuum drying, where heat is supplied by conduction or radiation (or microwaves), while the vapor thus produced is removed by the vacuum system. Another indirect technique is drum drying (used, for instance, for manufacturing potato flakes), where a heated surface is used to provide the energy, and aspirators draw the vapor outside the room. In contrast, the mechanical extraction of the solvent, e.g., water, by filtration or centrifugation, is not considered "drying" but rather "draining".

== Drying mechanism ==
In some products having a relatively high initial moisture content, an initial linear reduction of the average product moisture content as a function of time may be observed for a limited time, often known as a "constant drying rate period". Usually, in this period, it is surface moisture outside individual particles that is being removed. The drying rate during this period is mostly dependent on the rate of heat transfer to the material being dried. Therefore, the maximum achievable drying rate is considered to be heat-transfer limited. If drying is continued, the slope of the curve, the drying rate, becomes less steep (falling rate period) and eventually tends to become nearly horizontal at very long times. The product moisture content is then constant at the "equilibrium moisture content", where it is, in practice, in equilibrium with the dehydrating medium. In the falling-rate period, water migration from the product interior to the surface is mostly by molecular diffusion, i.e. the water flux is proportional to the moisture content gradient. This means that water moves from zones with higher moisture content to zones with lower values, a phenomenon explained by the second law of thermodynamics. If water removal is considerable, the products usually undergo shrinkage and deformation, except in a well-designed freeze-drying process. The drying rate in the falling-rate period is controlled by the rate of removal of moisture or solvent from the interior of the solid being dried and is referred to as being "mass-transfer limited". This is widely noticed in hygroscopic products such as fruits and vegetables, where drying occurs in the falling rate period with the constant drying rate period said to be negligible.

== Methods of drying ==
In a typical phase diagram, the boundary between gas and liquid runs from the triple point to the critical point. Regular drying is the green arrow, while supercritical drying is the red arrow and freeze drying is the blue.

The following are some general methods of drying:

- Application of hot air (convective or direct drying). Air heating increases the drying force for heat transfer and accelerates drying. It also reduces air relative humidity, further increasing the driving force for drying. In the falling rate period, as moisture content falls, the solids heat up and the higher temperatures speed up diffusion of water from the interior of the solid to the surface. However, product quality considerations limit the applicable rise to air temperature. Excessively hot air can almost completely dehydrate the solid surface, so that its pores shrink and almost close, leading to crust formation or "case hardening", which is usually undesirable. For instance in wood (timber) drying, air is heated (which speeds up drying) though some steam is also added to it (which hinders drying rate to a certain extent) in order to avoid excessive surface dehydration and product deformation owing to high moisture gradients across timber thickness. Spray drying belongs in this category.
- Indirect or contact drying (heating through a hot wall), as drum drying, vacuum drying. Again, higher wall temperatures will speed up drying but this is limited by product degradation or case-hardening. Drum drying belongs in this category.
- Dielectric drying (radiofrequency or microwaves being absorbed inside the material) is the focus of intense research nowadays. It may be used to assist air drying or vacuum drying. Researchers have found that microwave finish drying speeds up the otherwise very low drying rate at the end of the classical drying methods. Vacuum microwave drying is used for the US Army's experimental Close Combat Assault Ration.
- Freeze drying or lyophilization is a drying method where the solvent is frozen prior to drying and is then sublimed, i.e., passed to the gas phase directly from the solid phase, below the melting point of the solvent. It is increasingly applied to dry foods, beyond its already classical pharmaceutical or medical applications. It keeps biological properties of proteins, and retains vitamins and bioactive compounds. Pressure can be reduced by a high vacuum pump (though freeze drying at atmospheric pressure is possible in dry air). If using a vacuum pump, the vapor produced by sublimation is removed from the system by converting it into ice in a condenser, operating at very low temperatures, outside the freeze drying chamber.
- Supercritical drying (superheated steam drying) involves steam drying of products containing water. This process is feasible because water in the product is boiled off, and joined with the drying medium, increasing its flow. It is usually employed in closed circuit and allows a proportion of latent heat to be recovered by recompression, a feature which is not possible with conventional air drying, for instance. The process has potential for use in foods if carried out at reduced pressure, to lower the boiling point.
- Natural air drying takes place when materials are dried with unheated forced air, taking advantage of its natural drying potential. The process is slow and weather-dependent, so a wise strategy "fan off-fan on" must be devised considering the following conditions: Air temperature, relative humidity and moisture content and temperature of the material being dried. Grains are increasingly dried with this technique, and the total time (including fan off and on periods) may last from one week to various months, if a winter rest can be tolerated in cold areas.

== Applications of drying ==
=== Film formation ===
In the coatings and adhesives industry, drying is used to cure solvent-based films. In some cases, highly structured films can result. For example, evaporation of solvent from a solution containing helical polymer results in a highly ordered array of squashed toroidal structures.

=== Food ===
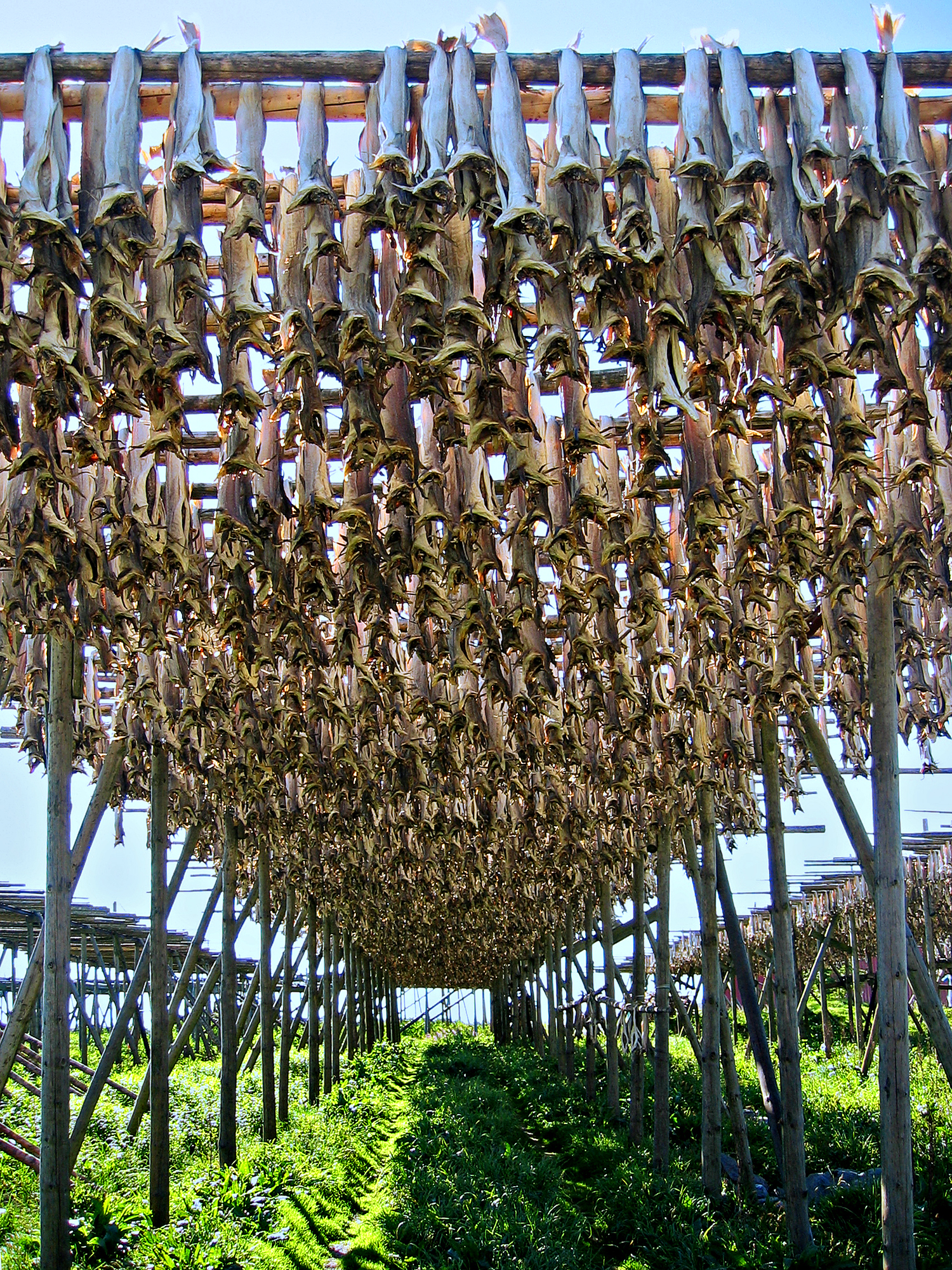
Drying of fish in Lofoten in the production of stockfish

Foods are dried to inhibit microbial development and quality decay. However, the extent of drying depends on product end-use. Cereals and oilseeds are dried after harvest to the moisture content that allows microbial stability during storage. Vegetables are blanched before drying to avoid rapid darkening, and drying is not only carried out to inhibit microbial growth, but also to avoid browning during storage. Concerning dried fruits, the reduction of moisture acts in combination with its acid and sugar contents to provide protection against microbial growth. Products such as milk powder must be dried to very low moisture contents in order to ensure flowability and avoid caking. This moisture is lower than that required to ensure inhibition to microbial development. Other products as crackers are dried beyond the microbial growth threshold to confer a crispy texture, which is liked by consumers.

=== Non-food products ===
Among non-food products, some of those that require considerable drying are wood (as part of timber processing), paper, flax, and washing powder. The first two, owing to their organic origins, may develop mold if insufficiently dried. Another benefit of drying is a reduction in volume and weight.

=== Sludges and fecal materials from sanitation processes ===
In the area of sanitation, drying of sewage sludge from sewage treatment plants, fecal sludge or feces collected in urine-diverting dry toilets (UDDT) is a common method to achieve pathogen kill, as pathogens can only tolerate a certain dryness level. In addition, drying is required as a process step if the excreta based materials are meant to be incinerated.

== See also ==
- Dehydration reaction
- Drying room

== Bibliography ==
1. Greensmith, M. (1998). Practical Dehydration. Woodhead Publishing, Ltd.
2. Genskow, L.R.; Beimesch, W.E.; Hecht, J.P.; Kemp, I.C.; Langrish, T.; Schwartzbach, C.; Smith, (F).L. (2007). Chemical Engineers' Handbook. Mc Graw Hill Professional. pp. Chapter 12 (Evaporative Cooling and Solids Drying).
3. A.S., Mujumdar (1998). Handbook of Industrial Drying. Boca Ratón: CRC Press.
