= Food dehydrator =

Home food preservation

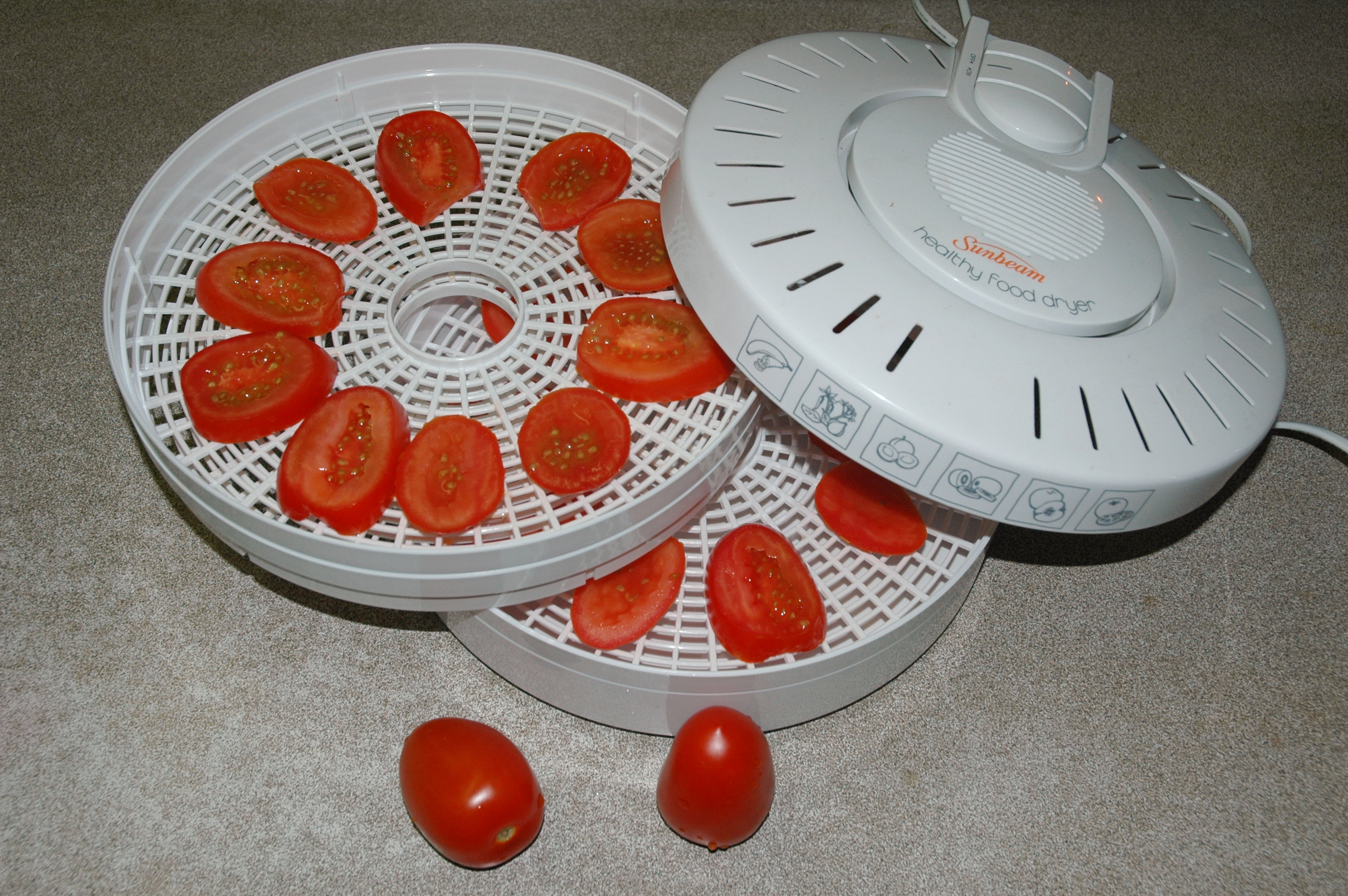
Tomato slices ready to be dried in a convection-type food dehydrator. In this model, multiple trays can be stacked on top of each other and warm air flows around the food.

A food dehydrator is a device that removes moisture from food to aid in its preservation. Food drying is a method of preserving fruit, vegetables and meats that has been practiced since antiquity.

== Design ==
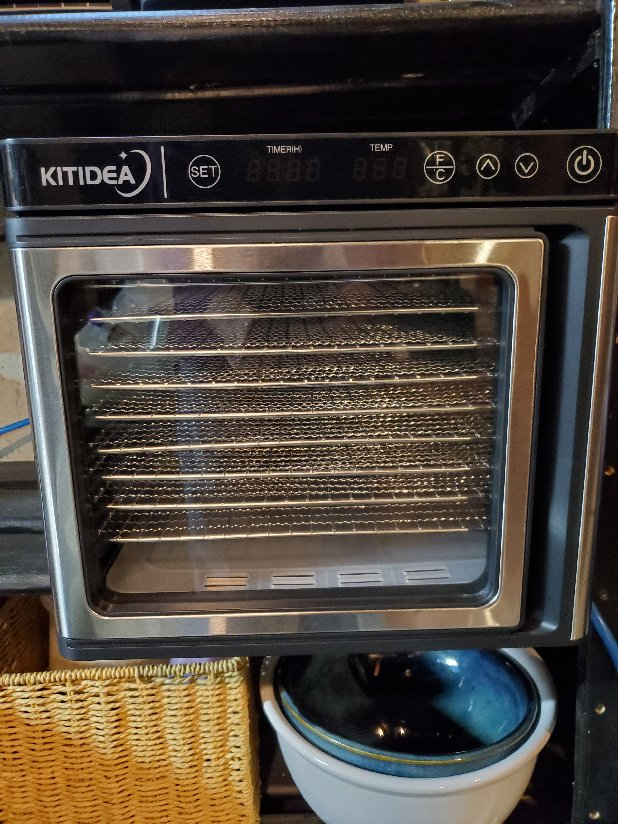
Metal racks in this food dehydrator

Most modern food dehydrators are low-power convection ovens that use heated air flow to reduce the water content of foods. The water content of food is usually very high, typically 80–95% for various fruits and vegetables and 50–75% for various meats. Removing moisture from food restrains various bacteria from growing and spoiling food, as well as dramatically reducing the weight and often the volume of the food, making it easier to store. Thus, food dehydrators are used to preserve and extend the shelf life of various foods.

Food dehydrators require heat sources such as solar energy, electric power or biofuel. Most food dehydrators currently use electric power. They vary in size from large-scale dehydration projects to do-it-yourself projects or commercially sold appliances for domestic use. A commercial food dehydrator's basic parts usually consist of a heating element, an electric fan, air vents which allow air to circulate, and food trays to lay food upon. As shown on the right, the trays most commonly have slits to provide more surface area between the food and the air. A dehydrator's heating element, fans and vents simultaneously work to direct hot air over the food, accelerate surface evaporation, and warm the food to also release moisture from its interior. This process continues until the food is dried to a substantially lower water content, usually less than 20%.

Most foods are dehydrated at 130 °F (54 °C), although meats being made into jerky should be dehydrated at a higher temperature of 155 °F (68 °C)—or preheated to that temperature—to guard against pathogens that may already be in the meat. These temperatures are similar to those used in pasteurization, and achieve similar effects. The key to successful food dehydration is the application of a constant temperature and adequate air flow. Too high a temperature or too low of airflow can cause hardened foods: food that is hard and dry on the outside, but moist, and therefore vulnerable to spoiling, on the inside.

=== Solar food dehydrators ===
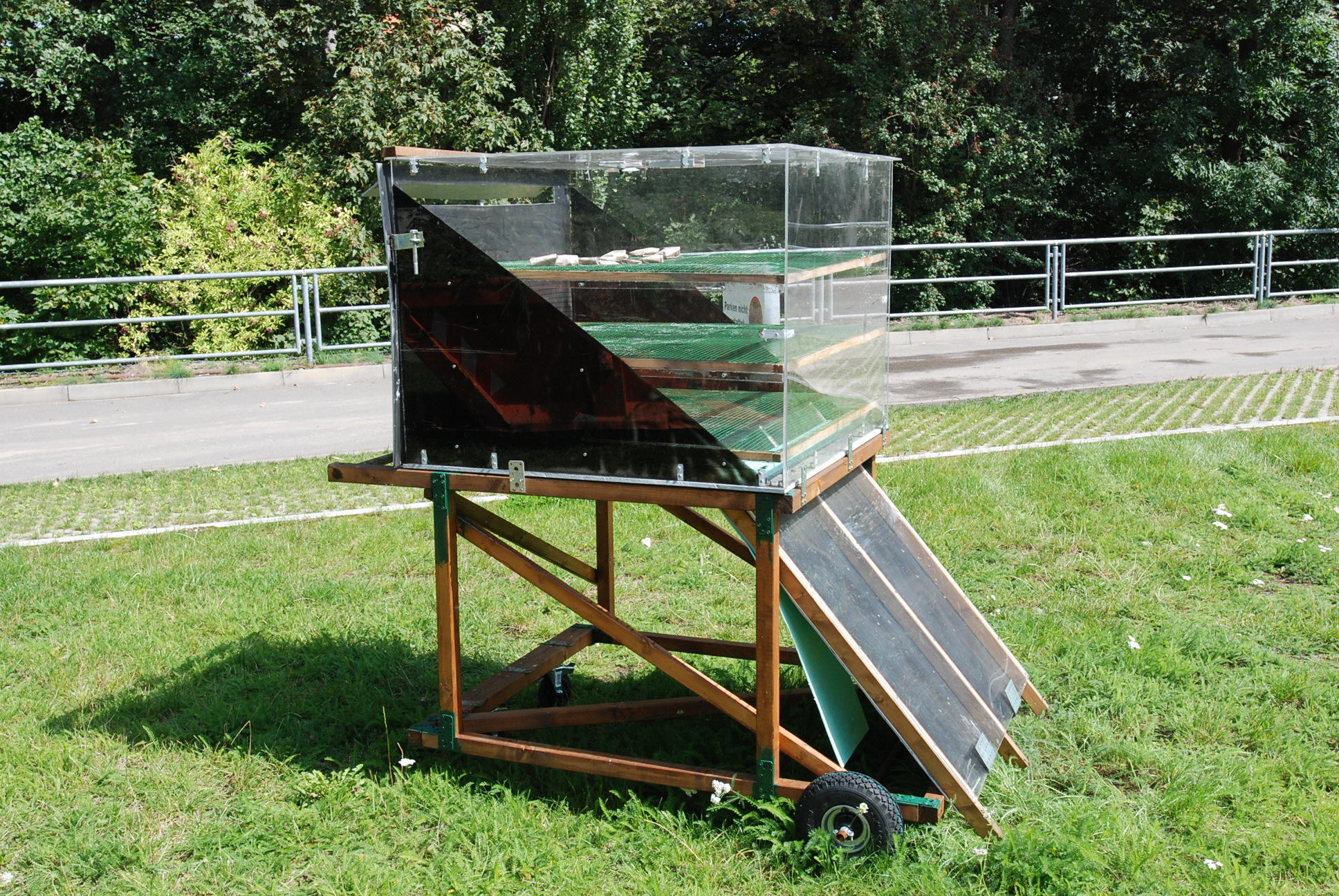
A solar food dehydrator

Solar food drying involves using a solar dryer designed and built specifically for this purpose. Solar drying is distinctly different from open-air "sun drying," a simple technique used for thousands of years. A good solar food dryer may dry food much faster than some air dryers. Some solar driers can achieve higher food drying temperatures than some air driers.

Food drying primarily requires heat, and solar radiation can easily be converted to heat. Transparent or translucent glazing allows sunlight to enter an enclosed chamber, which converts it to heat when it strikes a dark interior surface. Airflow is typically achieved with natural convection (warm air rises). Adjustable venting allows airflow and temperature to be controlled.

Solar food drying is effective and practical in most of the populated places of the world. A general rule is that, if you can grow a successful vegetable garden, then there is enough solar energy to dry the food you produce (some overcast, northern maritime climates are the exception).

Some solar food dryer designs employ a separate solar collector to generate the heated air, which is then directed into a food chamber or cabinet. This type of solar food dehydrator is called an indirect solar dryer. Other designs combine the collector and food cabinet and allow direct heating of food (these are called direct solar dryers). It is said that the indirect dryers allow much better drying, but the downside is their larger size. Backup electric heating can be incorporated into some solar food dehydrators to provide an alternative heat source if the weather changes.

Solar food dehydrators are often cited as viable tools in the search for agricultural sustainability and food security.

== See also ==
- List of dried foods
