= Spray drying =

Method of converting liquid or slurry to powder

Laboratory-scale spray dryer.: 1. Solution or suspension to be dried in; 2. Atomization gas in; 1. Drying gas in; 2. Heating of drying gas; 3. Spraying of solution or suspension; 4. Drying chamber; 5. Part between drying chamber and cyclone; 6. Cyclone; 7. Drying gas is taken away; 8. Collection vessel of product; The arrows indicate that this is co-current lab-spraydryer.

Spray drying is a method of forming a dry powder from a liquid or slurry by rapidly drying with a hot gas. This is the preferred method of drying of many thermally-sensitive materials such as foods and pharmaceuticals, or materials which may require extremely consistent, fine particle size. Air is most commonly used as the heated drying medium; however, nitrogen may be used if the liquid is flammable (such as ethanol) or if the product is oxygen-sensitive.

All spray dryers use some type of atomizer or spray nozzle to disperse the liquid or slurry into a controlled drop size spray. The most common of these are rotary disk and single-fluid high pressure swirl nozzles. Atomizer wheels are known to provide broader particle size distribution, but both methods allow for consistent distribution of particle size. Alternatively, for some applications two-fluid or ultrasonic nozzles are used. Depending on the process requirements, drop sizes from 10 to 500 μm can be achieved with the appropriate choices. The most common applications are in the 100 to 200 μm diameter range. The dry powder is often free-flowing.

The most common type of spray dryers are called single effect. There is a single source of drying air at the top of the chamber (see No. 4 on the diagram). In most cases the air is blown in the same direction as the sprayed liquid (co-current). A fine powder is produced, but it can have poor flowability and causes a lot of dust. To overcome the dust issues and poor flowability of the powder, a new generation of spray dryers called multiple effect spray dryers have been developed. Instead of drying the liquid in one stage, drying is done through two steps: the first at the top (as per single effect) and the second with an integrated static bed at the bottom of the chamber. The bed provides a humid environment which causes smaller particles to clump, producing more uniform particle sizes, usually within the range of 100 to 300 μm. These powders are free-flowing due to the larger particle size.

The fine powders generated by the first stage drying can be recycled in continuous flow either at the top of the chamber (around the sprayed liquid) or at the bottom, inside the integrated fluidized bed. The drying of the powder can be finalized on an external vibrating fluidized bed.

The hot drying gas can be passed in as a co-current, same direction as sprayed liquid atomizer, or counter-current, where the hot air flows against the flow from the atomizer. With co-current flow, particles spend less time in the system and the particle separator (typically a cyclone device). With counter-current flow, particles spend more time in the system and is usually paired with a fluidized bed system. Co-current flow generally allows the system to operate more efficiently.

Alternatives to spray dryers are:

1. Freeze dryer: a more-expensive batch process for products that degrade in spray drying. Dry product is not free-flowing.
2. Drum dryer: a less-expensive continuous process for low-value products; creates flakes instead of free-flowing powder.
3. Pulse combustion dryer: A less-expensive continuous process that can handle higher viscosities and solids loading than a spray dryer, and sometimes yields a freeze-dry quality powder that is free-flowing.

== History ==
The spray drying technique was first described in 1860 with the first spray dryer instrument patented by Samuel Percy in 1872. With time, the spray drying method grew in popularity, at first mainly for milk production in the 1920s and during World War II, when there was a need to reduce the weight and volume of food and other materials. In the second half of the 20th century, commercialization of spray dryers increased, as did the number of spray drying applications.

== Spray dryer ==
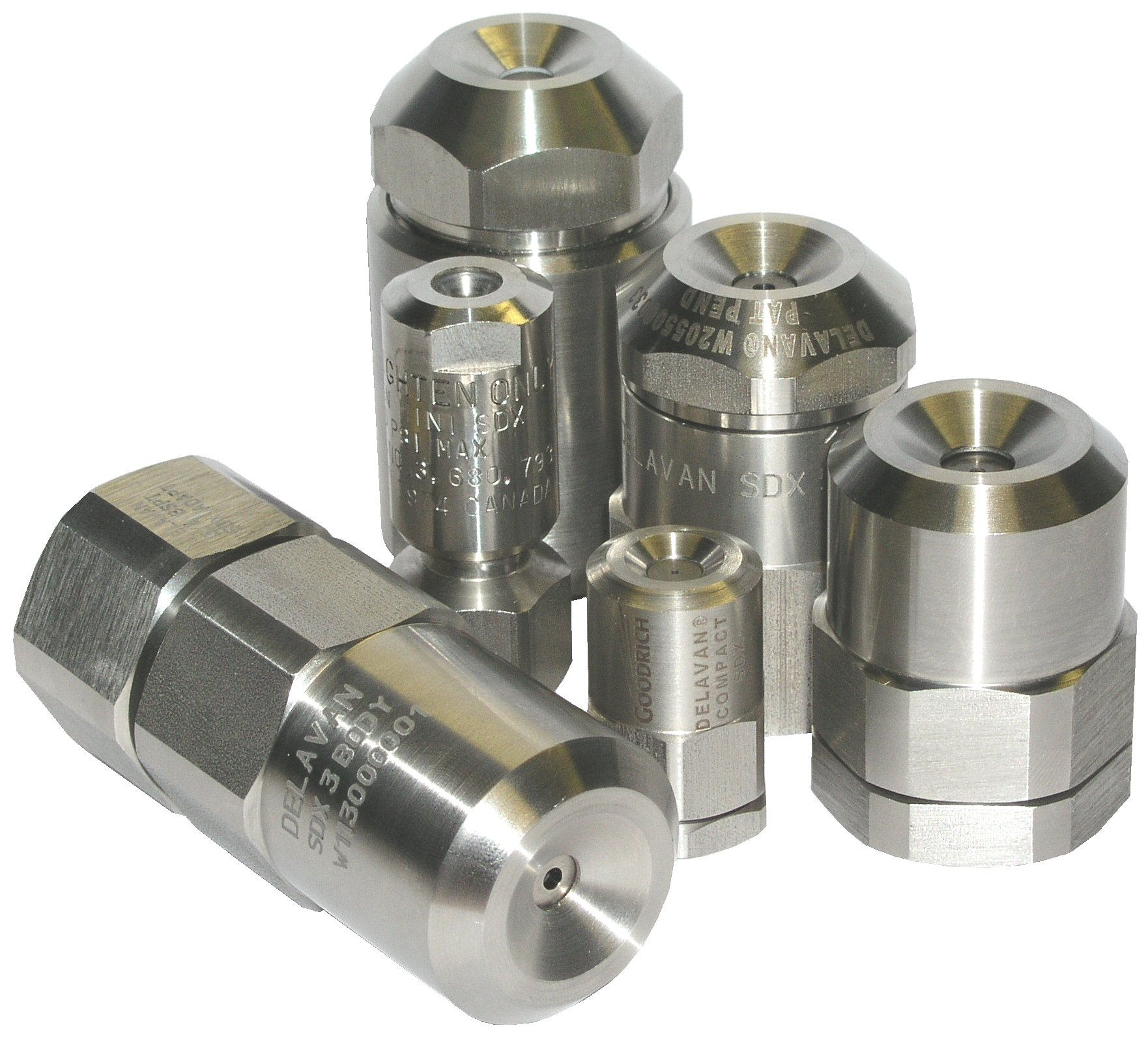
Spray drying nozzles

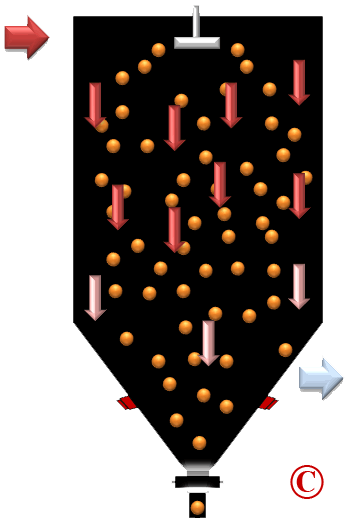
Schematic illustration of spray drying process

A spray dryer takes a liquid stream and separates the solute or suspension as a solid and the solvent into a vapor. The solid is usually collected in a drum or cyclone. The liquid input stream is sprayed through a nozzle into a hot vapor stream and vaporized. Solids form as moisture quickly leaves the droplets. A nozzle is usually used to make the droplets as small as possible, maximizing surface area hence heat transfer and the rate of water vaporization. Droplet sizes can range from 20 to 180 μm depending on the nozzle. There are two main types of nozzles: high pressure single fluid nozzle (50 to 300 bars) and two-fluid nozzles: one fluid is the liquid to dry and the second is compressed gas (generally air at 1 to 7 bars).

Spray dryers can dry a product very quickly compared to other methods of drying. They also turn a solution (or slurry) into a dried powder in a single step, which simplifies the process and improves profit margins.

In pharmaceutical manufacturing, spray drying is employed to manufacture Amorphous Solid Dispersions, by uniformly dispersing Active Pharmaceutical Ingredients into a polymer matrix. This state will put the active compounds (drug) in a higher state of energy which in turn facilitates diffusion of drug species in patient body.

== Micro-encapsulation ==
Spray drying often is used as an encapsulation technique by the food and other industries. A substance to be encapsulated (the load) and an amphipathic carrier (usually some sort of modified starch) are homogenized as a suspension in water (the slurry). The slurry is then fed into a spray drier, usually a tower heated to temperatures above the boiling point of water.

As the slurry enters the tower, it is atomized. Partly because of the high surface tension of water and partly because of the hydrophobic/hydrophilic interactions between the amphipathic carrier, the water, and the load, the atomized slurry forms micelles. The small size of the drops (averaging 100 micrometers in diameter) results in a relatively large surface area which dries quickly. As the water dries, the carrier forms a hardened shell around the load.

Load loss is usually a function of molecular weight. That is, lighter molecules tend to boil off in larger quantities at the processing temperatures. Loss is minimized industrially by spraying into taller towers. A larger volume of air has a lower average humidity as the process proceeds. By the osmosis principle, water will be encouraged by its difference in fugacities in the vapor and liquid phases to leave the micelles and enter the air. Therefore, the same percentage of water can be dried out of the particles at lower temperatures if larger towers are used. Alternatively, the slurry can be sprayed into a partial vacuum. Since the boiling point of a solvent is the temperature at which the vapor pressure of the solvent is equal to the ambient pressure, reducing pressure in the tower has the effect of lowering the boiling point of the solvent.

The application of the spray drying encapsulation technique is to prepare "dehydrated" powders of substances which do not have any water to dehydrate. For example, instant drink mixes are spray dries of the various chemicals which make up the beverage. The technique was once used to remove water from food products. One example is the preparation of dehydrated milk. Because the milk was not being encapsulated and because spray drying causes thermal degradation, milk dehydration and similar processes have been replaced by other dehydration techniques. Skim milk powders are still widely produced using spray drying technology, typically at high solids concentration for maximum drying efficiency. Thermal degradation of products can be overcome by using lower operating temperatures and larger chamber sizes for increased residence times.

Recent research is now suggesting that the use of spray-drying techniques may be an alternative method for crystallization of amorphous powders during the drying process since the temperature effects on the amorphous powders may be significant depending on drying residence times.

== Designing particle shape and size ==
The spray drying process contains a variety of input parameters that can alter the shape and size of yielded particles.

Common input parameters:

1. Solution concentration
2. Drying gas flow
3. Inlet temperature
4. Spraying gas flow
5. Feed rate

From the following input parameters comes a series of pathways a particle can take towards its yielded shape and size. Certain parameters like spraying gas flow, feed rate, and the solution concentration heavily influence the yielded particle size, whereas the inlet temperature plays a significant role into the shape of the particle at the end. Particle size has a great correlation with the original size of the solution droplet from the atomizer, so the greatest way to control particle size can be done by heavily saturating the solution and making the initial droplet larger or smaller. Once the initial droplet enters the drying chamber, the droplet can continue to crust formation, or no particle will be formed. From the crust formation, the temperature of the drying process and duration of the particle in the drying process can lead the particle toward a dry shell or a deformed particle. The dry shell can proceed into a solid particle or a shattered particle. The crust formation can also forgo the dry shell or deformed particle if the drying conditions are not correct and undergo an internal bubble nucleation with another series of pathways.

The current understanding of the drying conditions varies between different spray drying configurations and solution contents, but more research is being completed into the determination of what drives each particle shape pathways as future applications in pharmaceutical and industrial areas require better control over specific particle shapes and sizes of their products.

== Applications ==
Food
milk powder, coffee, tea, eggs, cereal, spices, flavorings, blood, starch and starch derivatives, vitamins, enzymes, stevia, nutraceutical, colourings, animal feed, etc.
Pharmaceutical
antibiotics, medical ingredients, additives.
Industrial
paint pigments, ceramic materials, catalyst supports, microalgae.

== Bibliography ==
- Charles Onwulata (2005). Encapsulated and powdered foods. CRC Press. p. 268. ISBN 978-0-8247-5327-6.
