= Vacuum drying =

Treatment to dry materials

Vacuum drying is the mass transfer operation in which the moisture present in a substance, usually a wet solid, is removed by means of creating a vacuum.

In chemical processing industries like food processing, pharmacology, agriculture, and textiles, drying is an essential unit operation to remove moisture. Vacuum drying is generally used for the drying of substances that are hygroscopic and heat-sensitive, and is based on the principle of creating a vacuum to decrease the chamber pressure below the vapor pressure of the water, causing it to boil. With the help of vacuum pumps, the pressure is reduced around the substance to be dried. This decreases the boiling point of water inside that product and thereby increases the rate of evaporation significantly. The result is a significantly increased drying rate of the product. The vacuum drying process is a batch operation performed at reduced pressures and lower relative humidity compared to ambient pressure, enabling faster drying.

== Vacuum dryer ==
Vacuum dryer is the equipment with the help of which vacuum drying is carried out. Vacuum dryers are sometimes made up of cast iron, but most are made of stainless steel, so that they can bear the high vacuum pressure without any kind of deformation. The oven is divided into hollow trays which increases the surface area for heat conduction. The oven door is locked air tight and is connected to vacuum pump to reduce the pressure.

The materials to be dried are kept on the trays inside the vacuum dryer and pressure is reduced by means of a vacuum pump. The dryer door is tightly shut and steam is passed through the space between trays and jacket so that the heat transfer occurs by conduction. Water vapors from the feed is sent into the condenser and after the drying vacuum pump is disconnected and the dried product is collected from the trays.

== Microwave vacuum drying ==
Because conventional drying approaches (e.g., convective drying) may cause great nutritional and textural changes (like a darker color due to Maillard reaction), microwave vacuum drying is an alternative for pharmaceuticals and food drying, a method known since 1989. The microwaves speed up the drying process and lower temperature in vacuum system, reducing overall drying cycle time and temperature-induced effects of the food product. Microwave vacuum drying may be used for production of dried pharmaceuticals and food. Industrialized equipment, however, may require pre-treating samples before processing in the industrial vacuum system; pre-drying is used by conventional methods to reduce bulk water content.

== Applications ==
Vacuum dryer can be used to dry heat sensitive hygroscopic and toxic materials. If the feed for drying is a solution, it can be dried using vacuum dryer as the solvent can be recovered by condensation. To improve the quality of products, such as for fruit preservation, hybrid drying combining osmotic dehydration followed by heat pump drying and microwave-vacuum drying proved effective.
