= Drum drying =

Drum drying is a method used for drying out liquids from raw materials with a drying drum. In the drum-drying process, pureed raw ingredients are dried at relatively low temperatures over rotating, high-capacity drums that produce sheets of drum-dried product. This product is milled to a finished flake or powder form. Modern drum drying techniques results in dried ingredients which reconstitute immediately and retain much of their original flavor, color and nutritional value.

Some advantages of drum drying include the ability to dry viscous foods which cannot be easily dried with other methods. Drum dryers are easy to operate and maintain.

Other products where drum drying can be used are, for example, starches, breakfast cereals, baby food, and instant mashed potatoes to make them cold-water-soluble.

== See also ==
- Freeze-drying
- Cryogenic Cooking
