= Food preservation =

Inhibition of microbial growth in food

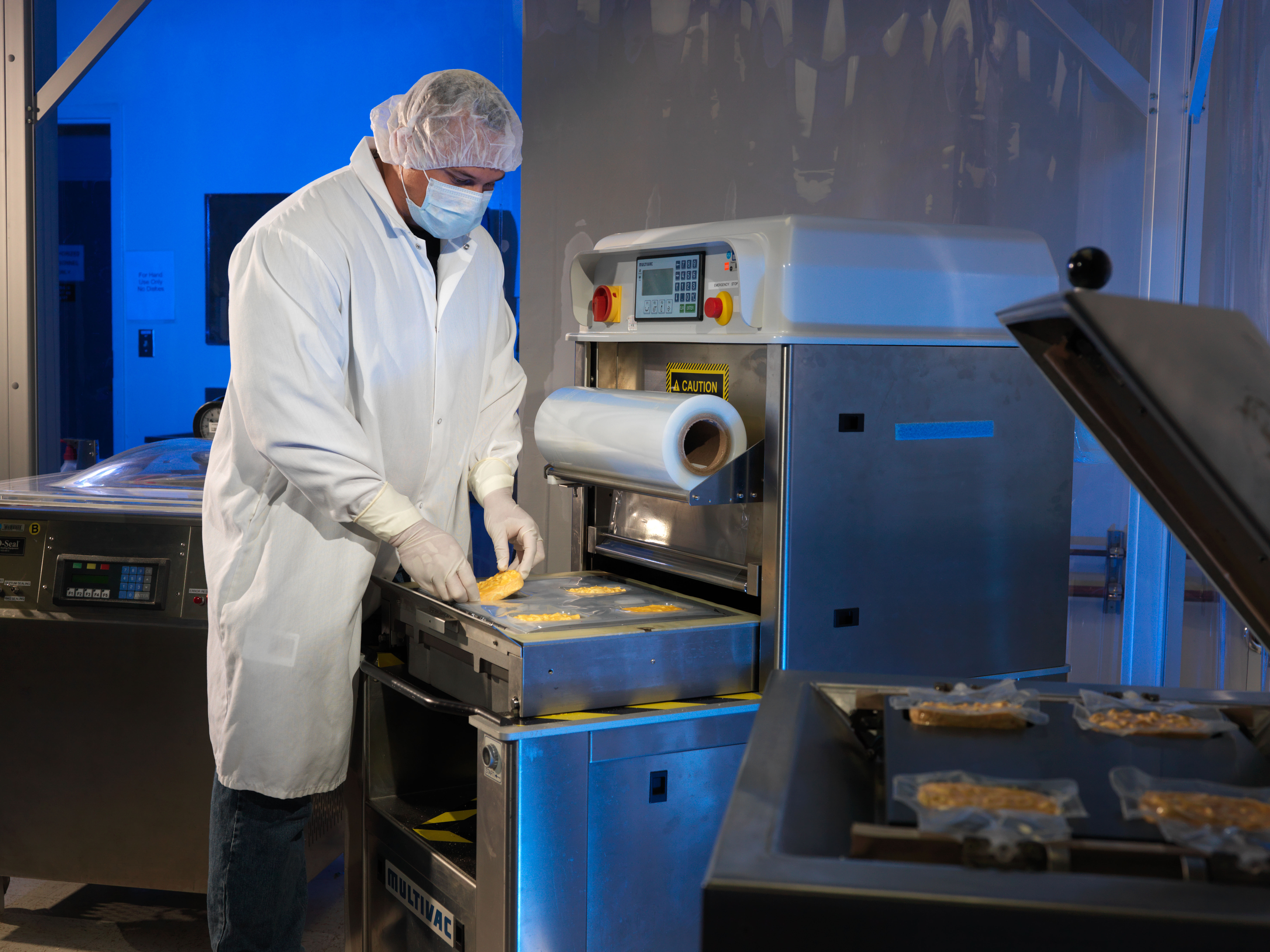
A food scientist is preparing a meal for astronauts in space.

Food preservation includes processes that make food more resistant to microorganism growth and slow the oxidation of fats. This slows down the decomposition and rancidification process. Food preservation may also include processes that inhibit visual deterioration, such as the enzymatic browning reaction in apples after they are cut during food preparation. By preserving food, food waste can be reduced, which is an important way to decrease production costs and increase the efficiency of food systems, improve food security and nutrition and contribute towards environmental sustainability. For instance, it can reduce the environmental impact of food production.

Many processes designed to preserve food involve more than one food preservation method. Preserving fruit by turning it into jam, for example, involves boiling (to reduce the fruit's moisture content and to kill bacteria, etc.), sugaring (to prevent their re-growth) and sealing within an airtight jar (to prevent recontamination).

Different food preservation methods have different impacts on the quality of the food and food systems. Some traditional methods of preserving food have been shown to have a lower energy input and carbon footprint compared to modern methods. Some methods of food preservation are also known to create carcinogens.

== Traditional techniques ==
Some techniques of food preservation pre-date the dawn of agriculture. Others were discovered more recently.

=== Boiling ===
Boiling liquids can kill any existing microbes. Milk and water are often boiled to kill any harmful microbes that may be present in them.

=== Burial ===
Burial of food can preserve it due to a variety of factors: lack of light, lack of oxygen, cool temperatures, pH level, or desiccants in the soil. Burial may be combined with other methods such as salting or fermentation. Most foods can be preserved in soil that is very dry and salty (thus a desiccant) such as sand, or soil that is frozen.

Many root vegetables are very resistant to spoilage and require no other preservation than storage in cool dark conditions, for example by burial in the ground, such as in a storage clamp (not to be confused with a root cellar). Cabbage was traditionally buried during autumn in northern US farms for preservation. Some methods keep it crispy while other methods produce sauerkraut. A similar process is used in the traditional production of kimchi.

Sometimes meat is buried under conditions that cause preservation. If buried on hot coals or ashes, the heat can kill pathogens, the dry ash can desiccate, and the earth can block oxygen and further contamination. If buried where the earth is very cold, the earth acts like a refrigerator, or, in areas of permafrost, a freezer.

In Odisha, India, it is practical to store rice by burying it underground. This method helps to store for three to six months during the dry season.

Butter and similar substances have been preserved as bog butter in Irish peat bogs for centuries. Century eggs are traditionally created by placing eggs in alkaline mud (or other alkaline substance), resulting in their "inorganic" fermentation through raised pH instead of spoiling. The fermentation preserves them and breaks down some of the complex, less flavorful proteins and fats into simpler, more flavorful ones.

=== Cooking/Heating ===
One of the oldest forms of food preservation, cooking made foods safer to eat and decreased spoilage times by killing bacteria and insect larvae. However, cooking is generally not sufficient to kill all the microorganisms present so it extends shelf life for only a short period, rather than other forms of thermal preservation which can last months or years, such as canning. Keeping the temperature high over a longer period of time to prevent any new growth is a method used with perpetual stews.

=== Canning ===
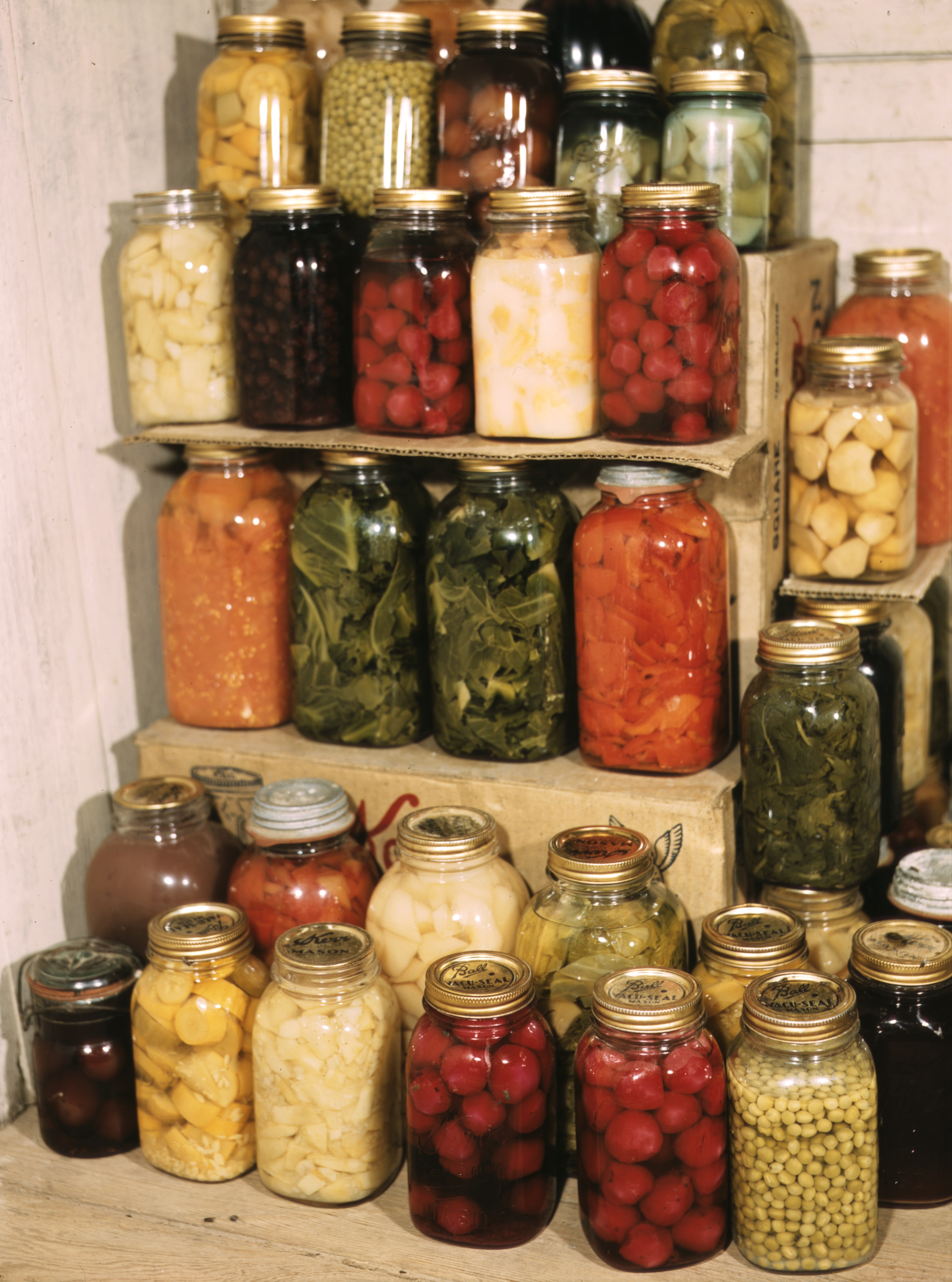
Preserved food

Canning involves cooking food, sealing it in sterilized cans or jars, and boiling the containers to kill or weaken any remaining bacteria as a form of sterilization. It was invented by the French confectioner Nicolas Appert. By 1806, this process was used by the French Navy to preserve meat, fruit, vegetables, and even milk. Although Appert had discovered a new way of preservation, it was not understood until 1864 when Louis Pasteur found the relationship between microorganisms, food spoilage, and illness.

Foods have varying degrees of natural protection against spoilage and may require that the final step occurs in a pressure cooker. High-acid fruits like strawberries require no preservatives to can and only a short boiling cycle, whereas marginal vegetables such as carrots require longer boiling and the addition of other acidic elements. Low-acid foods, such as vegetables and meats, require pressure canning. Food preserved by canning or bottling is at immediate risk of spoilage once the can or bottle has been opened.

Lack of quality control in the canning process may allow ingress of water or micro-organisms. Most such failures are rapidly detected as decomposition within the can cause gas production and the can will swell or burst. However, there have been examples of poor manufacture (underprocessing) and poor hygiene allowing contamination of canned food by the obligate anaerobe Clostridium botulinum, which produces an acute toxin within the food, leading to severe illness or death. This organism produces no gas or obvious taste and remains undetected by taste or smell. Its toxin is denatured by cooking, however. Cooked mushrooms, when handled poorly and then canned, can support the growth of Staphylococcus aureus, which produces a toxin that is not destroyed by canning or subsequent reheating.

=== Confit ===
Meat can be preserved by salting it, cooking it at or near 100 °C (212 °F) in some kind of fat (such as lard or tallow), and then storing it immersed in the fat. These preparations were popular in Europe before refrigerators became ubiquitous. They are still popular in France, where the term originates. The preparation will keep longer if stored in a cold cellar or buried in cold ground.

=== Cooling ===
Cooling preserves food by slowing down the growth and reproduction of microorganisms and the action of enzymes that causes the food to rot. The introduction of commercial and domestic refrigerators drastically improved the diets of many in the Western world by allowing food such as fresh fruit, salads and dairy products to be stored safely for longer periods, particularly during warm weather.

Before the era of mechanical refrigeration, cooling for food storage occurred in the forms of root cellars and iceboxes. Rural people often did their own ice cutting, whereas town and city dwellers often relied on the ice trade. Today, root cellaring remains popular among people who value various goals, including local food, heirloom crops, traditional home cooking techniques, family farming, frugality, self-sufficiency, organic farming, and others.

=== Curing ===
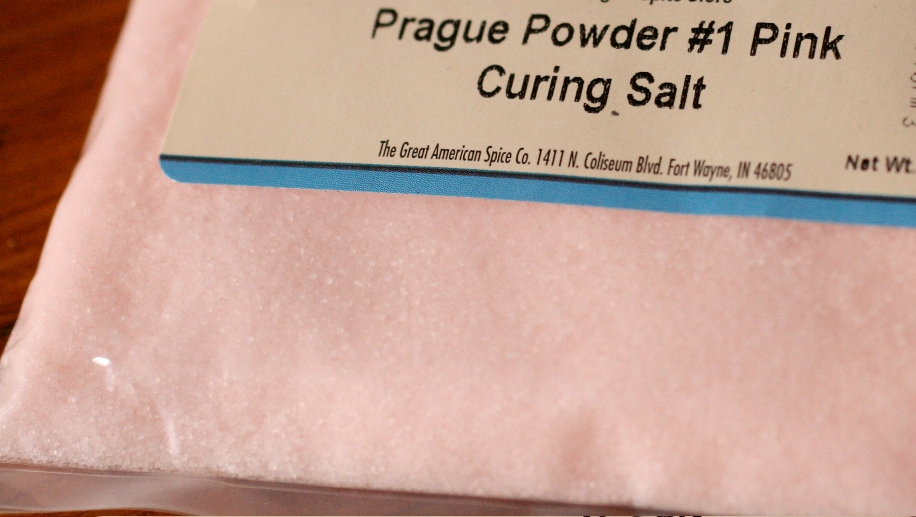
Bag of Prague powder#1, also known as "curing salt" or "pink salt". It is typically a combination of salt and sodium nitrite, with the pink color added to distinguish it from ordinary salt.

Curing is any of various food preservation and flavoring processes of foods such as meat, fish and vegetables, by the addition of salt, with the aim of drawing moisture out of the food by the process of osmosis. Because curing increases the solute concentration in the food and hence decreases its water potential, the food becomes inhospitable for the microbial growth that causes food spoilage. Smoking and salting techniques improve on the drying process and add antimicrobial agents that aid in preservation. Smoke deposits a number of pyrolysis products onto the food, including the phenols syringol, guaiacol and catechol. Salt accelerates the drying process using osmosis and also inhibits the growth of several common strains of bacteria. More recently nitrites have been used to cure meat, contributing a characteristic pink colour.

In 2015, the International Agency for Research on Cancer of the World Health Organization classified processed meat—i.e., meat that has undergone salting, curing, and smoking—as "carcinogenic to humans".

==== Drying ====
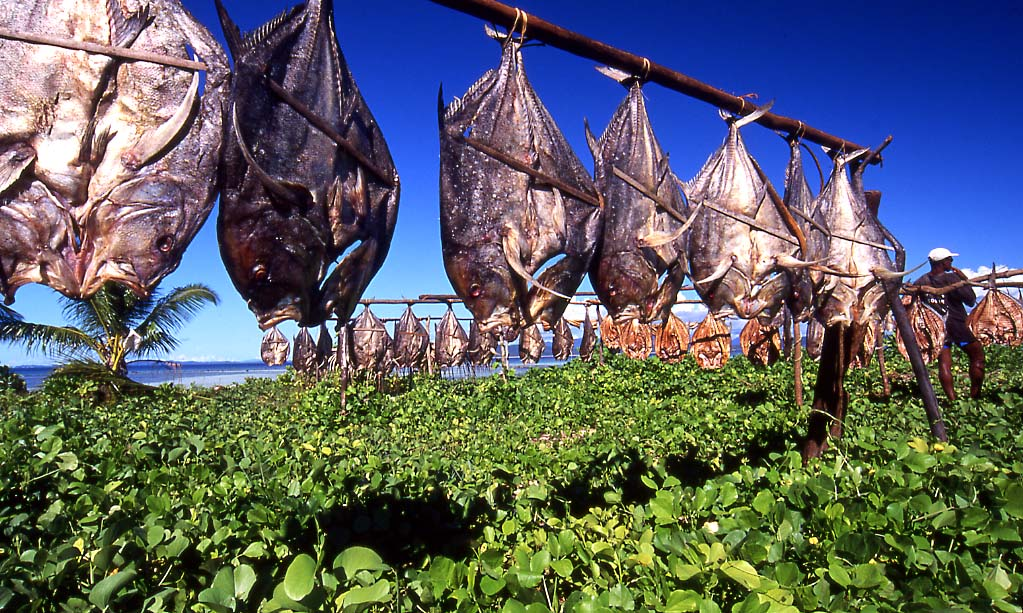
Flattened fish drying in the Sun

The earliest form of curing is drying, which has been in use since ancient times, the earliest known practice dates back to 12,000 B.C. by inhabitants of the modern Asian and Middle Eastern regions. Water is traditionally removed through evaporation by using methods such as air drying, sun drying, smoking or wind drying, although today electric food dehydrators can be used to speed the drying process and ensure more consistent results.

=== Fermentation ===
Some foods, such as many cheeses, wines, and beers, are prepared by fermentation. This involves cultivating specific microorganisms to combat spoilage from other, less benign organisms. These microorganisms keep pathogens in check by producing acid or alcohol, which eventually creates an environment toxic for themselves and other microorganisms.

Methods of fermentation include, but are not limited to, starter microorganisms, salt, hops, controlled (usually cool) temperatures and controlled (usually low) levels of oxygen. These methods are used to create the specific controlled conditions that will support the desirable organisms that produce food fit for human consumption. Fermentation is the microbial conversion of starch and sugars into alcohol. Not only can fermentation produce alcohol, but it can also be a valuable preservation technique. Fermentation can also make foods more nutritious and palatable.

Water was also turned into alcoholic beverages through fermentation. When water is used to make beer, the boiling during the brewing process may kill bacteria that could make people sick. The barley and other ingredients also infuse the drink with nutrients, and the microorganisms can also produce vitamins as they ferment. However, the common belief that premodern people avoided drinking ordinary water is a myth. While people avoided drinking dirty or polluted water, they also avoided using it for the production of beer and wine. Water was visually inspected, smelled, tasted, filtered, and boiled if necessary. It was used for drinking as well as for diluting wine, cooking, and many other processes.

=== Freezing ===
Freezing is also one of the most commonly used processes, both commercially and domestically, for preserving a very wide range of foods, including prepared foods that would not have required freezing in their unprepared state. For example, potato waffles are stored in the freezer, but potatoes themselves require only a cool dark place to ensure many months' storage. Cold stores provide large-volume, long-term storage for strategic food stocks held in case of national emergency in many countries.

=== Jellying ===
Food may be preserved by cooking in a material that solidifies to form a gel. Such materials include gelatin, agar, maize flour, and arrowroot flour.

Some animal flesh forms a protein gel when cooked. Eels and elvers, and sipunculid worms, are a delicacy in Xiamen, China, as are jellied eels in the East End of London, where they are eaten with mashed potatoes. British cuisine has a rich tradition of potted meats. Meat off-cuts were, until the 1950s, preserved in aspic, a gel made from gelatin and clarified meat broth. Another form of preservation is setting the cooked food in a container and covering it with a layer of fat. Potted chicken liver can be prepared in this way, and so can potted shrimps, to be served on toast. Calf's foot jelly used to be prepared for invalids.

Jellying is one of the steps in producing traditional pâtés. Many jugged meats (see below) are also jellied.

Another type of jellying is fruit preserves, which are preparations of cooked fruits, vegetables and sugar, often stored in glass jam jars and Mason jars. Many varieties of fruit preserves are made globally, including sweet fruit preserves, such as those made from strawberry or apricot, and savory preserves, such as those made from tomatoes or squash. The ingredients used and how they are prepared determine the type of preserves; jams, jellies, and marmalades are all examples of different styles of fruit preserves that vary based upon the fruit used. In English, the word preserves, in plural form, is used to describe all types of jams and jellies.

=== Jugging ===
Meat can be preserved by jugging. Jugging is the process of stewing the meat (commonly game or fish) in a covered earthenware jug or casserole. The animal to be jugged is usually cut into pieces, placed into a tightly sealed jug with brine or gravy, and stewed. Red wine and/or the animal's own blood is sometimes added to the cooking liquid. Jugging was a popular method of preserving meat up until the middle of the 20th century.

=== Kangina ===
In rural Afghanistan, grapes are preserved in disc-shaped vessels made of mud and straw, called kangina. The vessels, which can preserve fresh grapes for up to 6 months, passively control their internal environments to restrict gas exchange and water loss, prolonging the lives of late-harvested grapes stored within them.

=== Lye ===
Sodium hydroxide (lye) makes food too alkaline for bacterial growth. Lye will saponify fats in the food, which will change its flavor and texture. Lutefisk uses lye in its preparation, as do some olive recipes. Modern recipes for century eggs also call for lye.

=== Pickling ===
Pickling is a method of preserving food in an edible, antimicrobial liquid. Pickling can be broadly classified into two categories: chemical pickling and fermentation pickling.

In chemical pickling, the food is placed in an edible liquid that inhibits or kills bacteria and other microorganisms. Typical pickling agents include brine (high in salt), vinegar, alcohol, and vegetable oil. Many chemical pickling processes also involve heating or boiling so that the food being preserved becomes saturated with the pickling agent. Common chemically pickled foods include cucumbers, peppers, corned beef, herring, and eggs, as well as mixed vegetables such as piccalilli.

In fermentation pickling, bacteria in the liquid produce organic acids as preservation agents, typically by a process that produces lactic acid through the presence of lactobacillales. Fermented pickles include sauerkraut, nukazuke, kimchi, and surströmming.

=== Sugaring ===
The earliest cultures have used sugar as a preservative, and it was commonplace to store fruit in honey. "Sugar tends to draw water from the microbes (plasmolysis). This process leaves the microbial cells dehydrated, thus killing them. In this way, the food will remain safe from microbial spoilage."

In northern climates without sufficient sun to dry foods, preserves are made by heating the fruit with sugar. Sugar is used to preserve fruits, either in an antimicrobial syrup with fruit such as apples, pears, peaches, apricots, and plums, or in crystallized form where the preserved material is cooked in sugar to the point of crystallization and the resultant product is then stored dry. The latter method is used for the skins of citrus fruit (candied peel), angelica, and ginger.

== Modern industrial techniques ==
Techniques of food preservation were developed in research laboratories for commercial applications.

=== Aseptic processing ===
Aseptic processing works by placing sterilized food (typically by heat, see ultra-high temperature processing) into sterilized packaging material under sterile conditions. The result is a sealed, sterile food product similar to canned food, but depending on the technique used, damage to food quality is typically reduced compared to canned food. A greater variety of packaging materials can be used as well.

Besides UHT, aseptic processing may be used in conjunction with any of the microbe-reduction technologies listed below. With pasteurization and "high pressure pasteurization", the food may not be completely sterilized (instead achieving a specified log reduction), but the use of sterile packaging and environments is retained.

=== Pasteurization ===
Pasteurization is a process for preservation of liquid food. It was originally applied to combat the souring of young local wines. Today, the process is mainly applied to dairy products. In this method, milk is heated at about 70 °C (158 °F) for 15–30 seconds to kill the bacteria present in it and cooling it quickly to 10 °C (50 °F) to prevent the remaining bacteria from growing. The milk is then stored in sterilized bottles or pouches in cold places. This method was invented by Louis Pasteur, a French chemist, in 1862.

=== Vacuum packing ===
Vacuum-packing stores food in a vacuum environment, usually in an air-tight bag or bottle. The vacuum environment strips bacteria of oxygen needed for survival. Vacuum-packing is commonly used for storing nuts to reduce loss of flavor from oxidization. A major drawback to vacuum packaging, at the consumer level, is that vacuum sealing can deform contents and rob certain foods, such as cheese, of its flavor.

=== Freeze drying ===
Freeze drying, also known as lyophilization or cryodesiccation, is a low-temperature dehydration process that involves freezing the product and lowering pressure, thereby removing the ice by sublimation. This is in contrast to dehydration by most conventional methods that evaporate water using heat.

Because of the low temperatures used in processing, the rehydrated product retains many of its original qualities. When solid objects like strawberries are freeze dried the original shape of the product is maintained. If the product to be dried is a liquid, as often seen in pharmaceutical applications, the properties of the final product are optimized by the combination of excipients (i.e., inactive ingredients). Primary applications of freeze drying include biological (e.g., bacteria and yeasts), biomedical (e.g., surgical transplants), food processing (e.g., coffee), and food preservation.

=== Preservatives ===
Preservative food additives can be antimicrobial – which inhibit the growth of bacteria or fungi, including mold – or antioxidant, such as oxygen absorbers, which inhibit the oxidation of food constituents. Common antimicrobial preservatives include nisin, sorbates, calcium propionate, sodium nitrate/nitrite, sulfites (sulfur dioxide, sodium bisulfite, potassium hydrogen sulfite, etc.), EDTA, hinokitiol, and ε-polylysine. Antioxidants include tocopherols (Vitamin E), butylated hydroxyanisole (BHA) and butylated hydroxytoluene (BHT). Other preservatives include ethanol.

There is also another approach of impregnating packaging materials (plastic films or other) with antioxidants and antimicrobials.

=== Irradiation ===
Irradiation of food is the exposure of food to ionizing radiation. Multiple types of ionizing radiation can be used, including beta particles (high-energy electrons) and gamma rays (emitted from radioactive sources such as cobalt-60 or cesium-137). Irradiation can kill bacteria, molds, and insect pests, reduce the ripening and spoiling of fruits, and at higher doses induce sterility. The technology may be compared to pasteurization; it is sometimes called "cold pasteurization", as the product is not heated. Irradiation may allow lower-quality or contaminated foods to be rendered marketable.

National and international expert bodies have declared food irradiation as "wholesome"; organizations of the United Nations, such as the World Health Organization and Food and Agriculture Organization, endorse food irradiation. Consumers may have a negative view of irradiated food based on the misconception that such food is radioactive; in fact, irradiated food does not and cannot become radioactive. Activists have also opposed food irradiation for other reasons, for example, arguing that irradiation can be used to sterilize contaminated food without resolving the underlying cause of the contamination. International legislation on whether food may be irradiated or not varies worldwide from no regulation to a full ban.

Approximately 500,000 tons of food items are irradiated per year worldwide in over 40 countries. These are mainly spices and condiments, with an increasing segment of fresh fruit irradiated for fruit fly quarantine.

=== Pulsed electric field electroporation ===
Pulsed electric field (PEF) electroporation is a method for processing cells by means of brief pulses of a strong electric field. PEF holds potential as a type of low-temperature alternative pasteurization process for sterilizing food products. In PEF processing, a substance is placed between two electrodes, then the pulsed electric field is applied. The electric field enlarges the pores of the cell membranes, which kills the cells and releases their contents. PEF for food processing is a developing technology still being researched. There have been limited industrial applications of PEF processing for the pasteurization of fruit juices. To date, several PEF treated juices are available on the market in Europe. Furthermore, for several years a juice pasteurization application in the US has used PEF. For cell disintegration purposes especially potato processors show great interest in PEF technology as an efficient alternative for their preheaters. Potato applications are already operational in the US and Canada. There are also commercial PEF potato applications in various countries in Europe, as well as in Australia, India, and China.

=== Modified atmosphere ===
Modifying atmosphere is a way to preserve food by operating on the atmosphere around it. It is often used to package:

- Fresh fruits and vegetables, especially salds crops, which contain living cells that respire even while refrigerated. Reducing oxygen (O_{2}) concentration and increasing the carbon dioxide (CO_{2}) concentration slows down their respiration, conserves stored energy, and therefore increases shelf life. High humidity is also used to reduce water loss.
- Red meat, which needs high O_{2} to reduce oxidation of myoglobin and maintain an attractive bright red color of the meat.
- Other meat and fish, which uses higher CO_{2} to reduce oxidation and slow down some microbes.

=== Nonthermal plasma ===
This process subjects the surface of food to a "flame" of ionized gas molecules, such as helium or nitrogen. This causes micro-organisms to die off on the surface.

=== High-pressure food preservation ===
High pressure can be used to disable harmful microorganisms and spoilage enzymes while retaining the food's fresh appearance, flavor, texture and nutrients. By 2005, the process was being used for products ranging from orange juice to guacamole to deli meats and widely sold. Depending on temperature and pressure settings, HP processing can achieve either pasteurization-equivalent log reduction or go all the way to achieve sterilization of all microbes.

=== Biopreservation ===
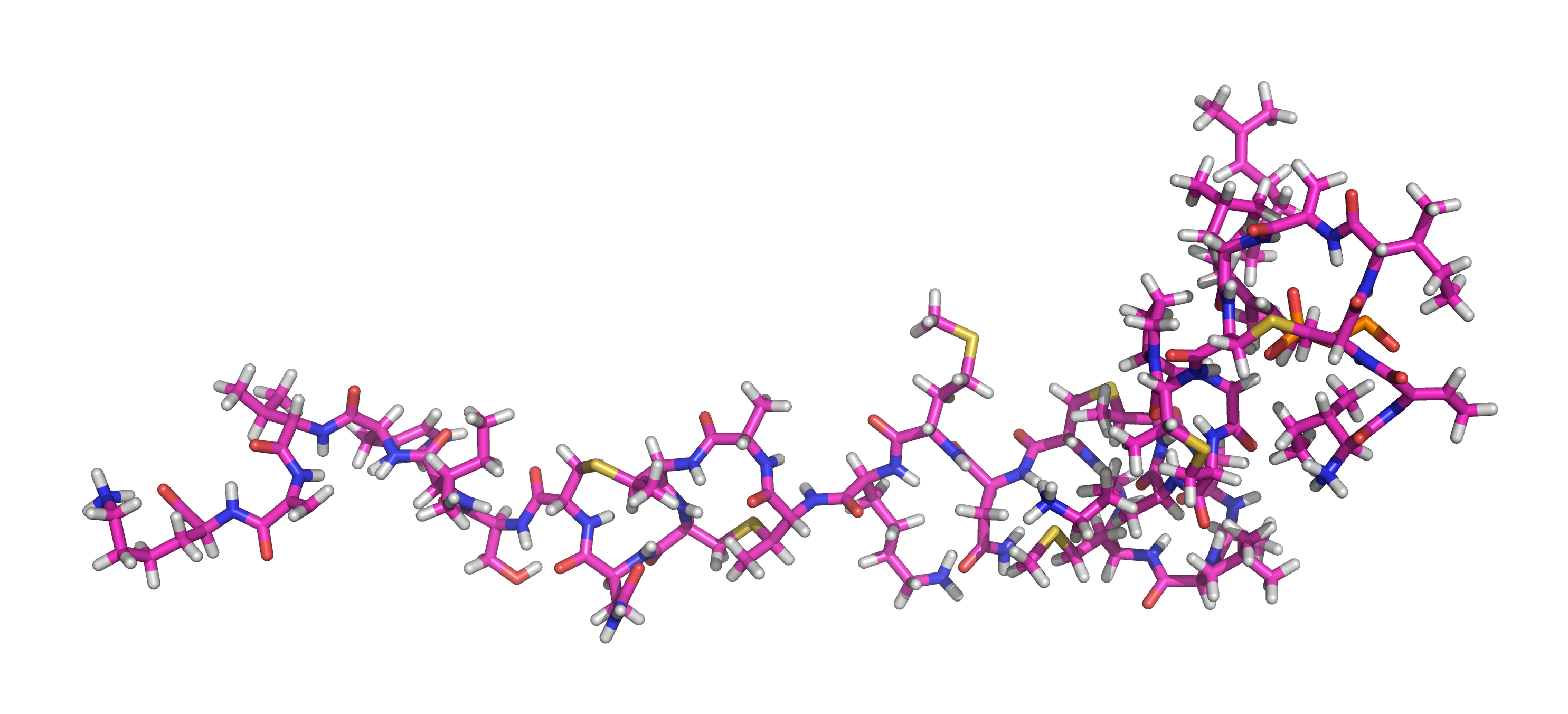
3D stick model of nisin. Some lactic acid bacteria manufacture nisin. It is a particularly effective preservative.

Biopreservation is the use of natural or controlled microbiota or antimicrobials as a way of preserving food and extending its shelf life. Beneficial bacteria or the fermentation products produced by these bacteria are used in biopreservation to control spoilage and render pathogens inactive in food. It is a benign ecological approach which is gaining increasing attention.

Lactic acid bacteria (LAB) have antagonistic properties that make them particularly useful as biopreservatives. When LABs compete for nutrients, their metabolites often include active antimicrobials such as lactic acid, acetic acid, hydrogen peroxide, and peptide bacteriocins. Some LABs produce the antimicrobial nisin, which is a particularly effective preservative.

LAB bacteriocins are used in the present day as an integral part of hurdle technology. Using them in combination with other preservative techniques can effectively control spoilage bacteria and other pathogens, and can inhibit the activities of a wide spectrum of organisms, including inherently resistant Gram-negative bacteria.

=== Hurdle technology ===
Hurdle technology is a method of ensuring that pathogens in food products can be eliminated or controlled by combining more than one approach. These approaches can be thought of as "hurdles" the pathogen has to overcome if it is to remain active in the food. The right combination of hurdles can ensure all pathogens are eliminated or rendered harmless in the final product.

Hurdle technology has been defined by Leistner (2000) as an intelligent combination of hurdles that secures the microbial safety and stability as well as the organoleptic and nutritional quality and the economic viability of food products. The organoleptic quality of the food refers to its sensory properties, that is its look, taste, smell, and texture.

Examples of hurdles in a food system are high temperature during processing, low temperature during storage, increasing the acidity, lowering the water activity or redox potential, and the presence of preservatives or biopreservatives. According to the type of pathogens and how risky they are, the intensity of the hurdles can be adjusted individually to meet consumer preferences in an economical way, without sacrificing the safety of the product.

Principal hurdles used for food preservation (after Leistner, 1995)
Parameter	Symbol	Application
High temperature	F	Heating
Low temperature	T	Chilling, freezing
Reduced water activity	a_{w}	Drying, curing, conserving
Increased acidity	pH	Acid addition or formation
Reduced redox potential	E_{h}	Removal of oxygen or addition of ascorbate
Biopreservatives		Competitive flora such as microbial fermentation
Other preservatives		Sorbates, sulfites, nitrites

== See also ==
- Blast chilling
- Food engineering
- Food microbiology
- Food packaging
- Food rheology
- Food science
- Food spoilage
- Freeze-drying
- Fresherized
- List of dried foods
- List of pickled foods
- List of smoked foods
- Shelf life

== Sources ==
- This article incorporates text from a free content work. Licensed under CC BY-SA 3.0 (license statement/permission). Text taken from The State of Food and Agriculture 2019. Moving forward on food loss and waste reduction, In brief, 24, FAO, FAO.
