= Intermediate moisture food =

Shelf-stable food products with moisture contents of 15-40%

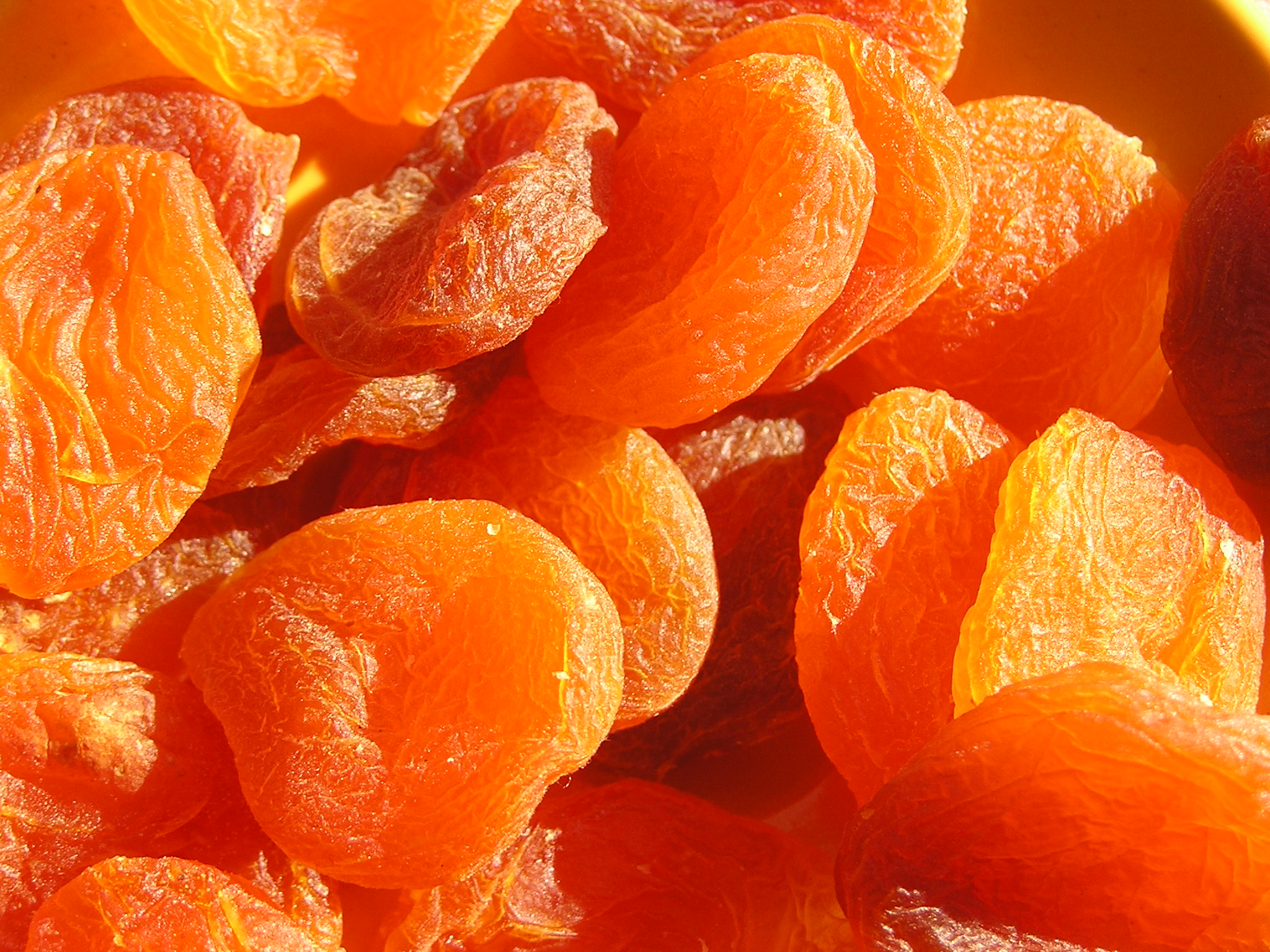
Dried apricots

Intermediate moisture foods (IMF) are shelf-stable products that have water activities of 0.6-0.85, with a moisture content ranging from 15% - 40% and are edible without rehydration. These food products are below the minimum water activity for most bacteria (0.90), but are susceptible to yeast and mold growth. Historically, ancient civilizations would produce IMF using methods such as sun drying, roasting over fire and adding salt to preserve food for winter months or when preparing for travel. Currently, this form of processing is achieved by using one of four methods: partial drying, osmotic drying using a humectant, dry infusion and by formulation. A variety of products are classified as IMF, such as dried fruits, sugar added commodities, marshmallows, and pie fillings.

== Shelf-life and safety ==
The purpose of IMF foods is to achieve a water activity that the food can be stored safely without refrigeration. However, the food is not sterile. Staphylococcus aureus is a microorganism of concern as it can grow and produce specific enterotoxins in water activities of 0.83-0.86 under aerobic conditions. Because of this, proper handling, storage, hygiene and good manufacturing practices are necessary to prevent Staphylococcus aureus. Molds of Aspergillis and Penicillium species can grow and produce harmful mycotoxins at water activity 0.77-0.85. Salmonella and Bacillus cereus are the primary pathogens of concern with low-moisture foods and IMFs. Most illnesses associated with low-moisture foods or IMFs have been caused by Salmonella spp. To reduce the risk of bacterial growth, products are treated with a combination of low pH, addition of sugar, salt and preservatives, and a thermal process that can eliminate pathogens and extend shelf-life. In the case of yeasts and molds, chemical preservatives such as sorbates and propionates are used to inhibit their growth.

== Processing ==
=== Partial drying ===
To achieve 0.6-0.84 water activity in food products, partial drying is employed for raw food that naturally have a high amount of humectants such as raisins, apricots, prunes and sultanas. Humectants are solutes (such as sugar or salt) that immobilize water in food. The drying process removes free water, and the humectants in the product bind the rest of the water, not allowing it to be utilized for chemical reactions or for microbial use.

=== Osmotic drying using a humectant ===
Osmotic dehydration is the process of soaking food in highly concentrated solutions of humectant. Salt and sugar are commonly used humectants for this process. Water diffusion from the food to the humectant solution is caused by osmotic pressure. The water is replaced by the humectant, which results in a lowered water activity for the food product. Osmotic dehydration process results in two way mass transfer in regards to the moisture lost and the solids gained, with moisture loss being much greater than the addition of solids. Advantages of osmotic dehydration include low processing temperatures, short drying times, and 20-30% lower energy consumption than typical dehydration processes. Sugar is used as the humectant for candied intermediate moisture fruits, and salt is used for intermediate moisture vegetables and fish. Additionally, a mixture of humectants can be formulated to manipulate the sensory properties of the food product. Osmotic drying using a humectant results in a soft texture in the final product.

=== Dry infusion ===
Dry infusion is the combination of partial dehydration and osmotic dehydration using a humectant. The food product is first dehydrated and then the resultant product is added to a humectant solution to reach the desired water activity. This method is desirable because it results in a higher quality and more appealing product. However, more energy is used for this method because it is two processing steps combined. Dry infusion is primarily employed by the U.S military and NASA for production of IMF to produce safe, palatable food that can be consumed much later than it is produced.

=== Formulated intermediate moisture foods ===
Many types of food are specially formulated to achieve water activity in the IMF range. Food ingredients are mixed with salt and/or sugar, and additives (such as propylene glycol and potassium sorbate) and then subjected to processing methods such as cooking, extrusion or dehydration to result in an intermediate moisture final product. Examples of formulated IMF are confectioneries and pet food.

== Applications ==
=== Fruits and vegetables ===
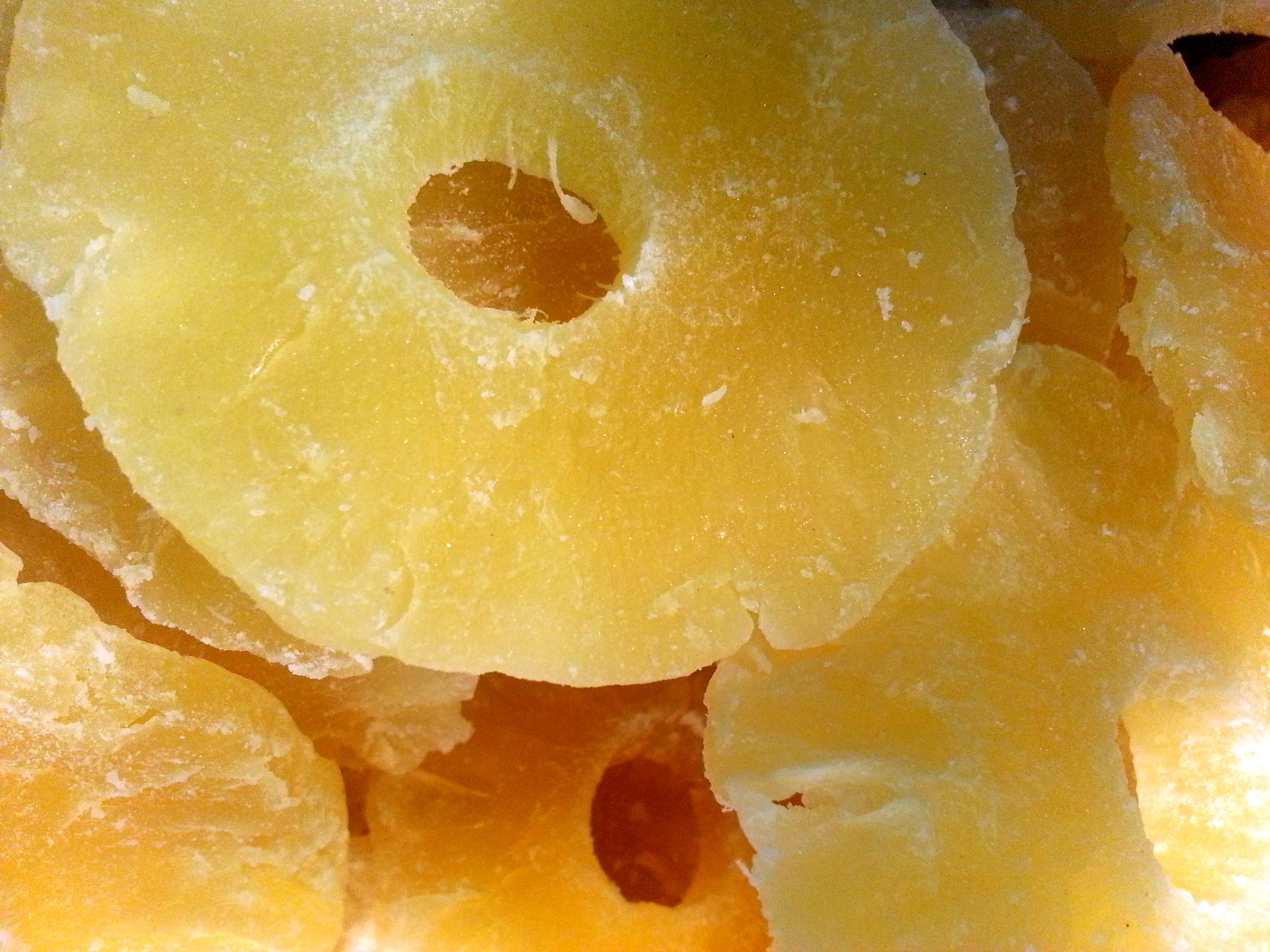
Dried Pineapples

Sugar is added to fruit to protect against microbial contamination and reduce water activity in the fruit. This allows the fruit to be more stable at room temperature. Some examples are strawberries, prunes, peaches, apricots, and pineapples. IMF blueberries are prepared by osmotic dehydration. They are soaked in sugar for one to two days followed by a freeze drying process until the desired moisture level is reached.

=== Meat ===
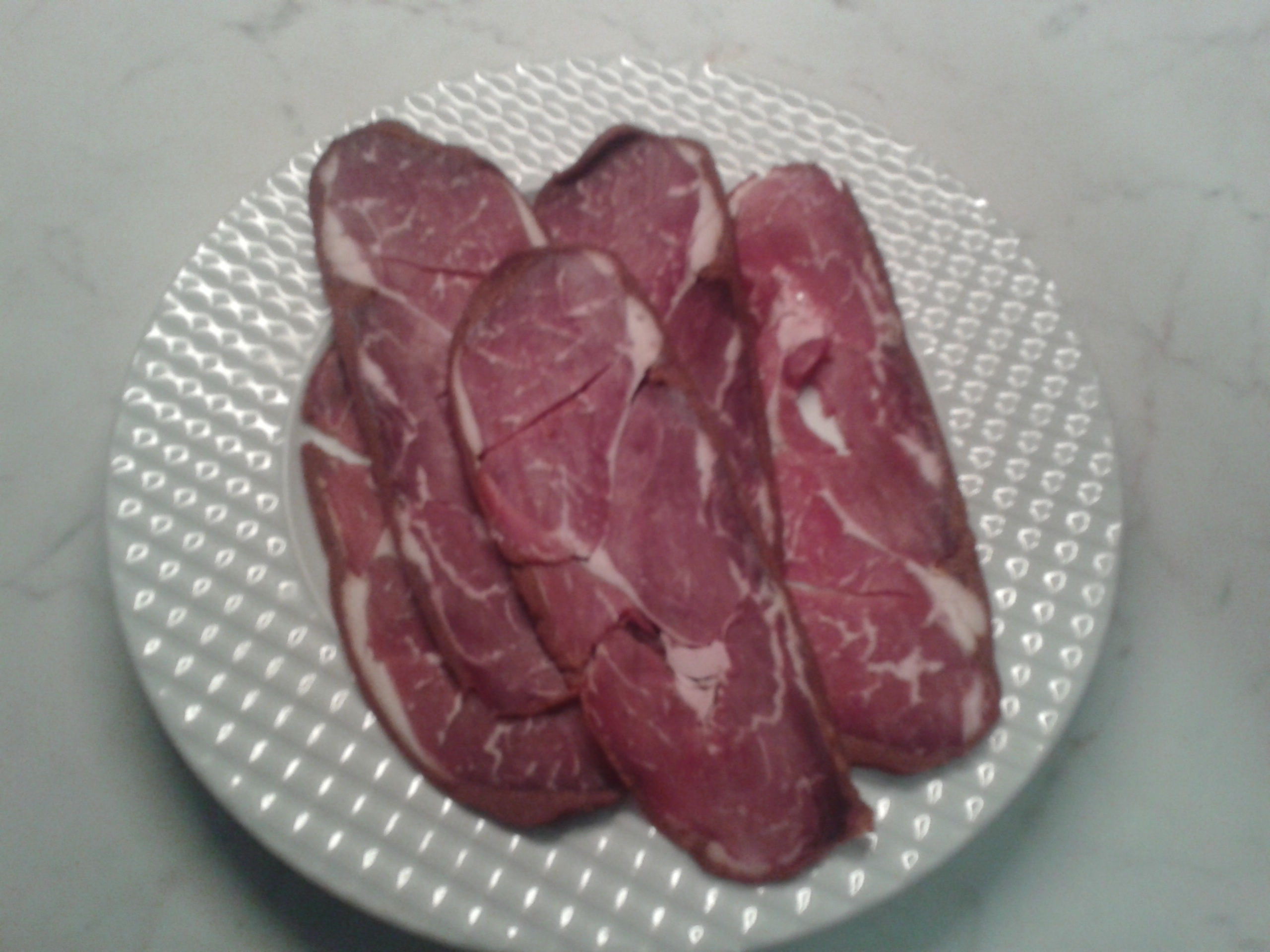
Pastirma

Fermented meats, sausage, jerky, and corned beef can last many months without refrigeration. Pastirma is a beef product that is often eaten raw in the Middle East and Mediterranean countries. It is made from the hindquarter of beef cattle. Pastirma is a type of intermediate moisture food and can be stored for several months in humid climates. The meat is salted and dried to reduce water activity and increase microbial safety. Additionally, nitrites are added for preservation. The final product has 5% salt and a moisture content between 30-35%.

=== Pet food ===
Semi-moist pet food such as chewy dog treats and soft cat treats are shelf-stable, soft and do not have a high moisture content. Ingredients added to intermediate moisture pet food to achieve lower water activity are soy flakes and wheat flour in addition to solutes such as glycerol, salt, and sugar. Processing techniques such as extrusion are employed to attain the final intermediate moisture pet food. Intermediate moisture pet food are convenient products because they leave less odor and are less messy than canned wet pet food. Additionally, they have been found to be more palatable to pets than dry pet food products.

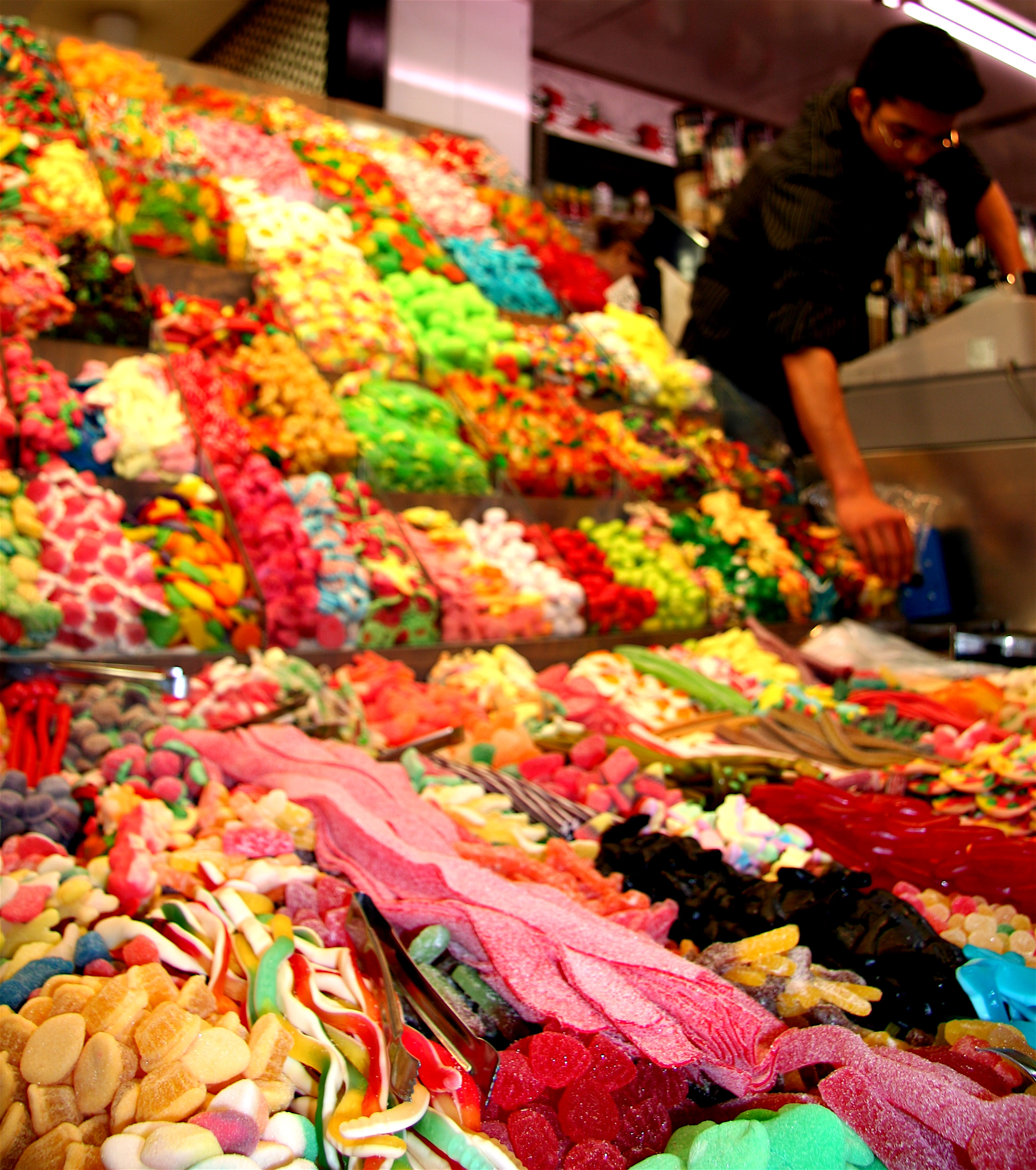
Various Candy and Confectionaries

=== Baked goods and confectioneries ===
Cakes are considered to be intermediate moisture foods because of their moisture content (18-28%), and have low enough water activity that preserve the safety and quality. Some examples of baked goods and confectionery that come under this category are fruit cakes, pie fillings, candies, marshmallows, jams, pizza crust. Tutti Fruiti is a candy-like product that can be made from a variety of fruit, most commonly papaya. Raw pieces of unripe papaya are boiled and layered with sucrose until reaching 68 degrees brix. The solution is then air dried until a moisture content of 25.7% is reached.

Water activities of some common IMF products
Range	Food
0.85-0.75	Sweet condensed milk, fruit cake, salted fish, molasses, jams, dog food, dried fruit, icings, soy sauce, jam
0.75-0.65	Dates, figs, nuts, parmesan cheese, dulce de leche
0.60-0.65	Honey, chocolate bars, marshmallows, biscuits

== Advantages ==
Intermediate moisture foods utilize hurdle technology by lowering water activity, reducing pH and using preservatives. Most bacteria do not grow under a water activity of 0.90 and IMF processing methods reduce water activity to 0.60-0.84. IMFs are often ready-to-eat and do not require refrigeration. This is especially important in countries with tropical climates and minimal storage and processing capacities. Nitrites and sulfites are added to food to prolong shelf life and delay flavor and color changes. Propylene glycol reduces water activity and acts as a plasticizing agent to give food its desired texture. Compared to canning, dehydration, and freezing, IMF food processing is less rigorous and results in less nutrient loss. This is because compared to other processing techniques, IMF processes are at lower temperatures, pressures, and there is no water leaching of nutrients. Additionally, IMF production is more energy efficient compared to conventional processes including canning and freezing since IMFs do not require refrigeration. The energy required for canning and freezing is costly, thus IMF are common in developing countries.

== Concerns ==
Since microbes, namely Salmonella and Bacillus cereus, can persist in IMFs, other hurdles including reduction in pH and the use of preservatives is not unusual. However, additives such as nitrites and sulfites are associated with health concerns. Nitrites have a negative connotation in the food industry since they can combine with secondary amines to form nitrosamines, which are carcinogenic. Nitrites are linked to an increase risk in cancer and heart disease. Sulfite is another additive that is commonly avoided due to people having a sensitivity to sulfites. Yeast and mold are not fully inhibited by IMF processing because these microorganisms can tolerate water activity as low as 0.80. Browning can occur during storage of Intermediate moisture fruits and vegetables. Finally, sugar used commonly added as a humectant increases the caloric value of the food.
