= Lavashak =

Persian fruit leather

Lavāshak
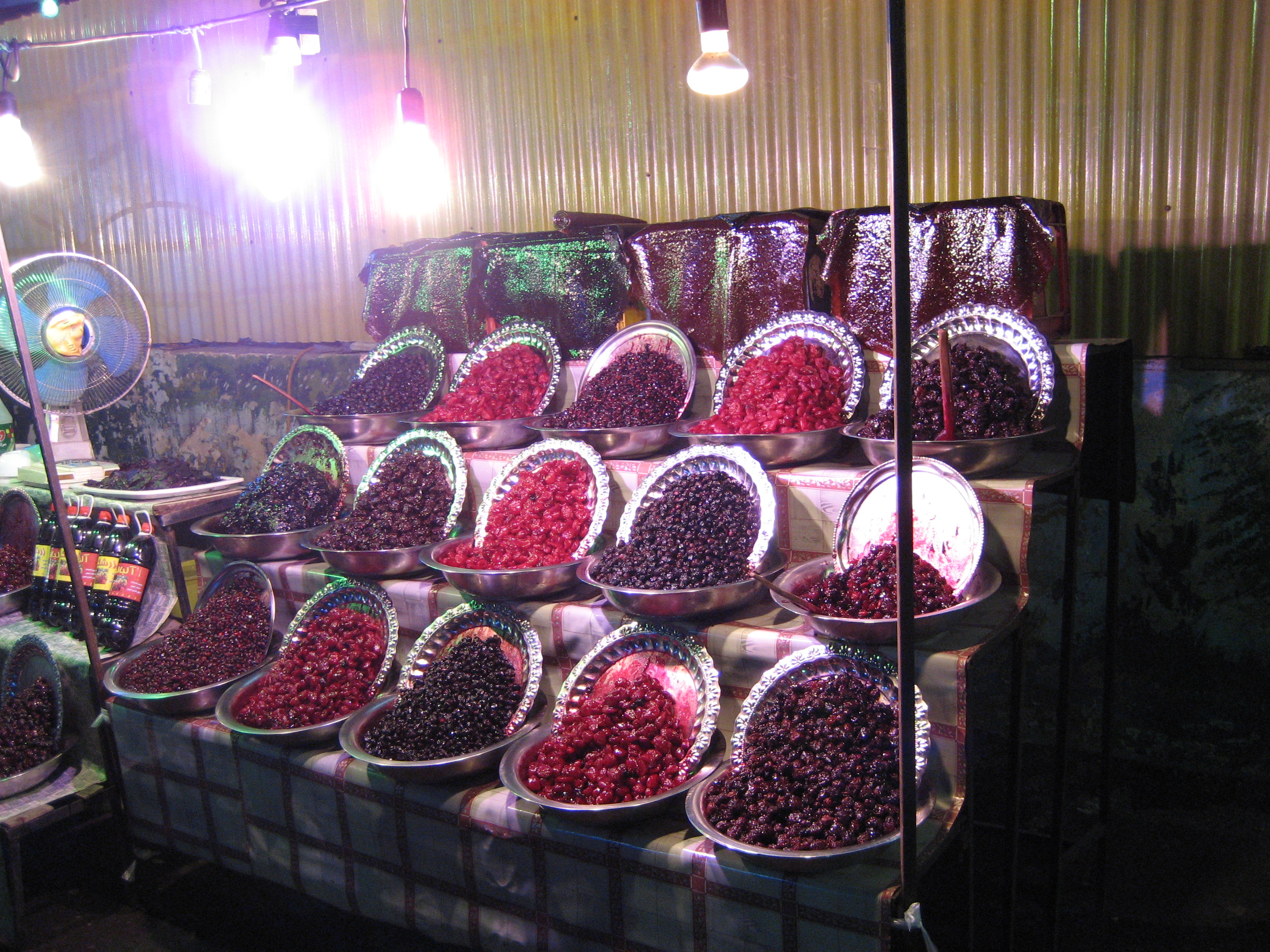
- Type: Fruit
- Course: Snack
- Place of origin: Iran
- Region or state: Iran
- Associated cuisine: Iranian cuisine
- Created by: Iranians
- Main ingredients: Various dried fruits and berries

Lavashak (Persian: لواشک) is an Iranian sour and salty or sweet fruit leather, a thin, firm and dried layer of fruit puree or a mix of different fruit purees such as plums, apricots, or pomegranates.

Lavashak is an ancient Iranian snack that dates back thousands of years. For its preparation, a mass of cooked-down fruit is salted, pressed through a sieve, smoothed to a height of approximately two millimeters and dried until it has cooled down and is firm. Lavashak is available in Iranian cuisine in sweet, sour and sweet-sour varieties.

Lavashak has been used since ancient times as a method to preserve fruits. For generations, it has been prepared in the traditional way at home. It is now also industrially manufactured.

== Name ==
Lavashak is derived from the Persian word "لواش" (lavash). Lavash refers to a traditional type of flatbread found in Iran, Armenia and other Asian countries. Since the ending -ak is a diminutive, lavashak can be roughly translated as "little bread."

== History ==
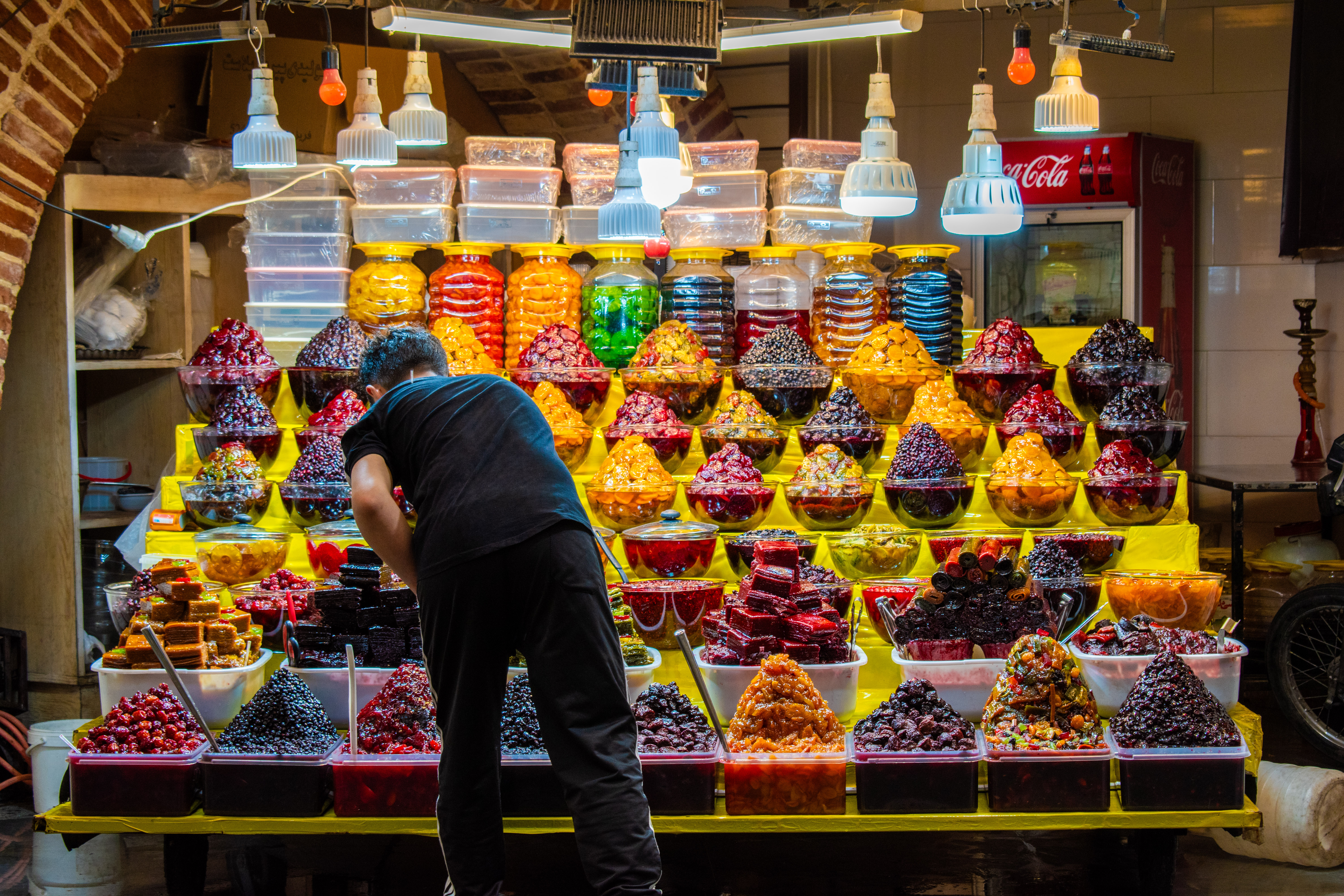
A Stall Selling Lavashak in Tehran, Iran.

The first appearances of lavashak in the Iranian region can be traced back to the Achaemenid period (550-330 BC). During this era, lavashak was used as a shelf-stable food item during military and commercial journeys. In ancient times, Persians made lavashak from large seasonal fruits to use them throughout the year.

During the Medieval era, lavashak was known as a popular snack consumed during celebrations and religious ceremonies. It was seen as a symbol of happiness.

In the Qajar era, lavashak production and consumption increased. A small lavashak industry was formed in Iran, and new methods were invented to produce and supply the food to the markets. During this time, lavashak was a popular gift at celebrations and family events.

In the 20th century, the introduction of modern technology and new methods of production and packaging, boosted the lavashak industry in Iran. Large-scale production plants were built, and lavashak began to be exported abroad.

== See also ==
- Pestil (also known as t'tu lavash)
