= Aspergillus chevalieri =

Scientific classification
- Kingdom: Fungi
- Division: Ascomycota
- Class: Eurotiomycetes
- Order: Eurotiales
- Family: Aspergillaceae
- Genus: Aspergillus
- Species: A. chevalieri

Binomial name
- Aspergillus chevalieri Thom & Church (1926)

Species of fungus

Aspergillus chevalieri is a species of fungus in the genus Aspergillus. It is from the Aspergillus section. The fungi in the Aspergillus section are known for their ability to grow at extremely low water activities. The species was first described in 1926. It has since been reported as an opportunistic pathogen causing skin infections.

The genome of A. chevalieri was sequenced as a part of the Aspergillus whole-genome sequencing project - a project dedicated to performing whole-genome sequencing of all members of the genus Aspergillus. The genome assembly size was 26.41 Mbp.

== Growth and morphology ==
Aspergillus chevalieri has been cultivated on both Czapek yeast extract agar (CYA) plates and Malt Extract Agar Oxoid (MEAOX) plates. The growth morphology of the colonies can be seen in the pictures below.

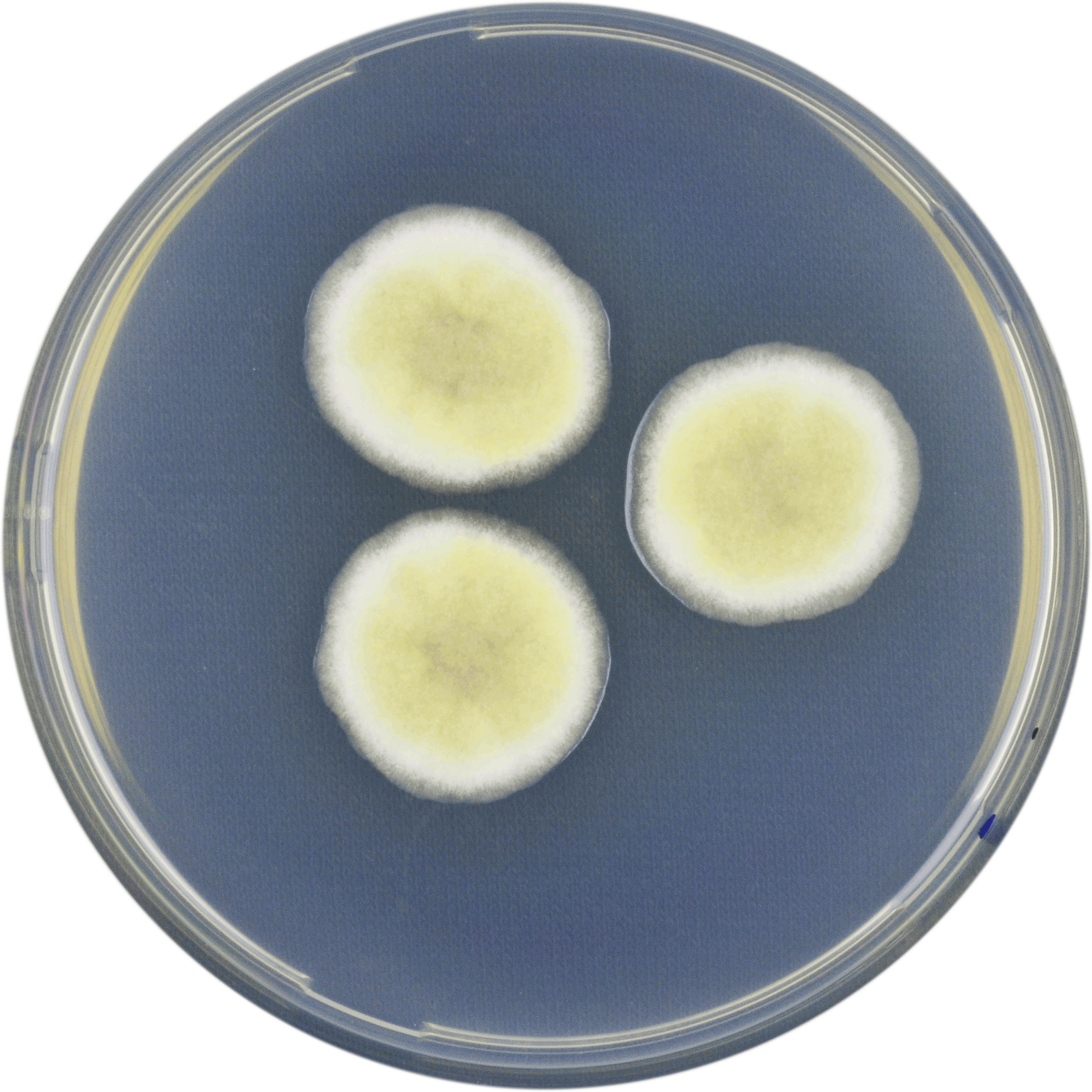
Aspergillus chevalieri growing on CYA plate

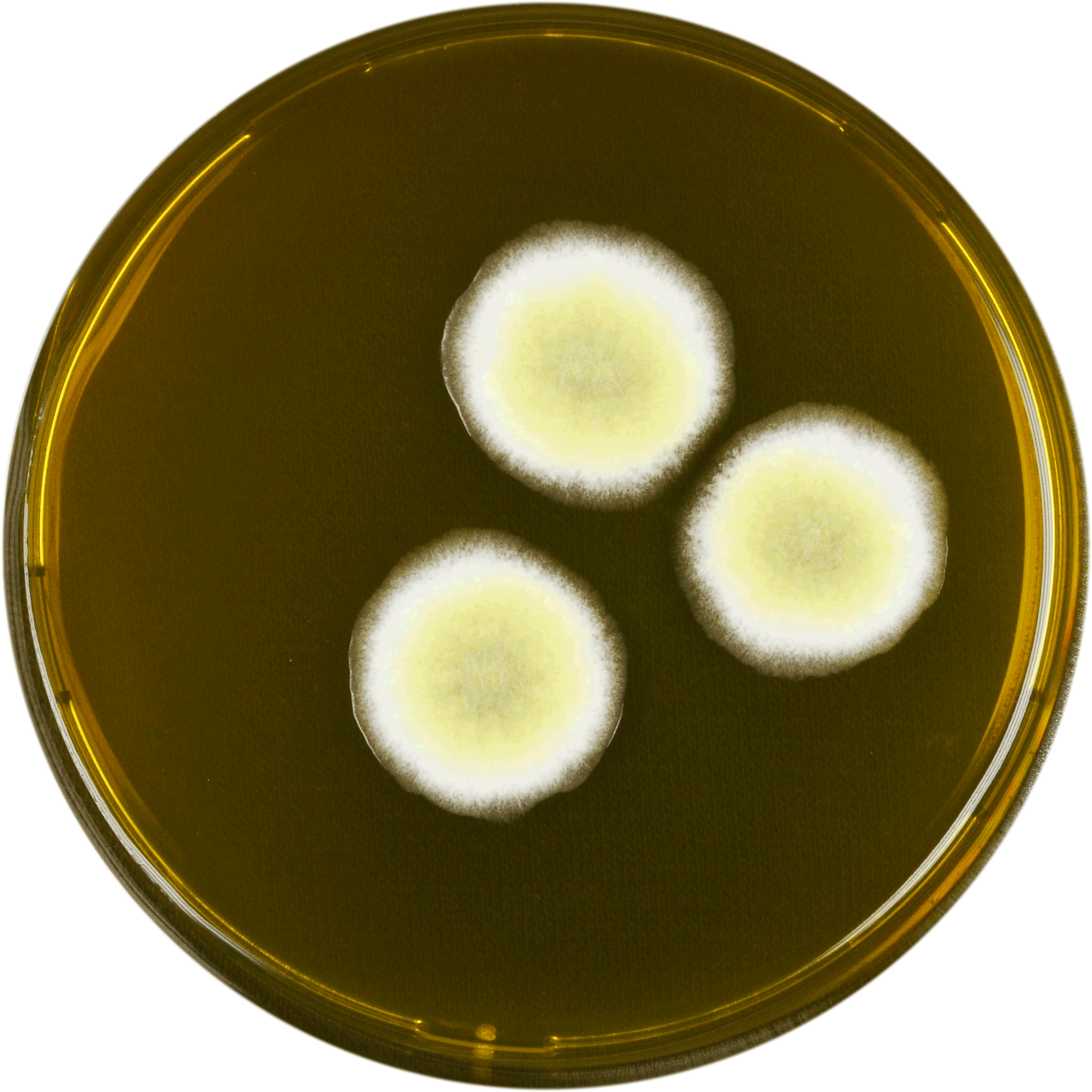
Aspergillus chevalieri growing on MEAOX plate
