= Biopreservation =

Preserving food with microbiota or antimicrobials

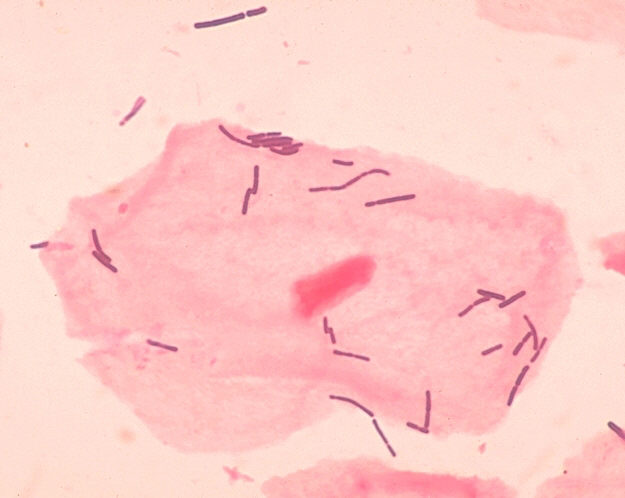
The small rods shown here are lactic acid bacteria which convert lactose and other sugars to lactic acid. The products of their metabolism can have benign preservative effects.

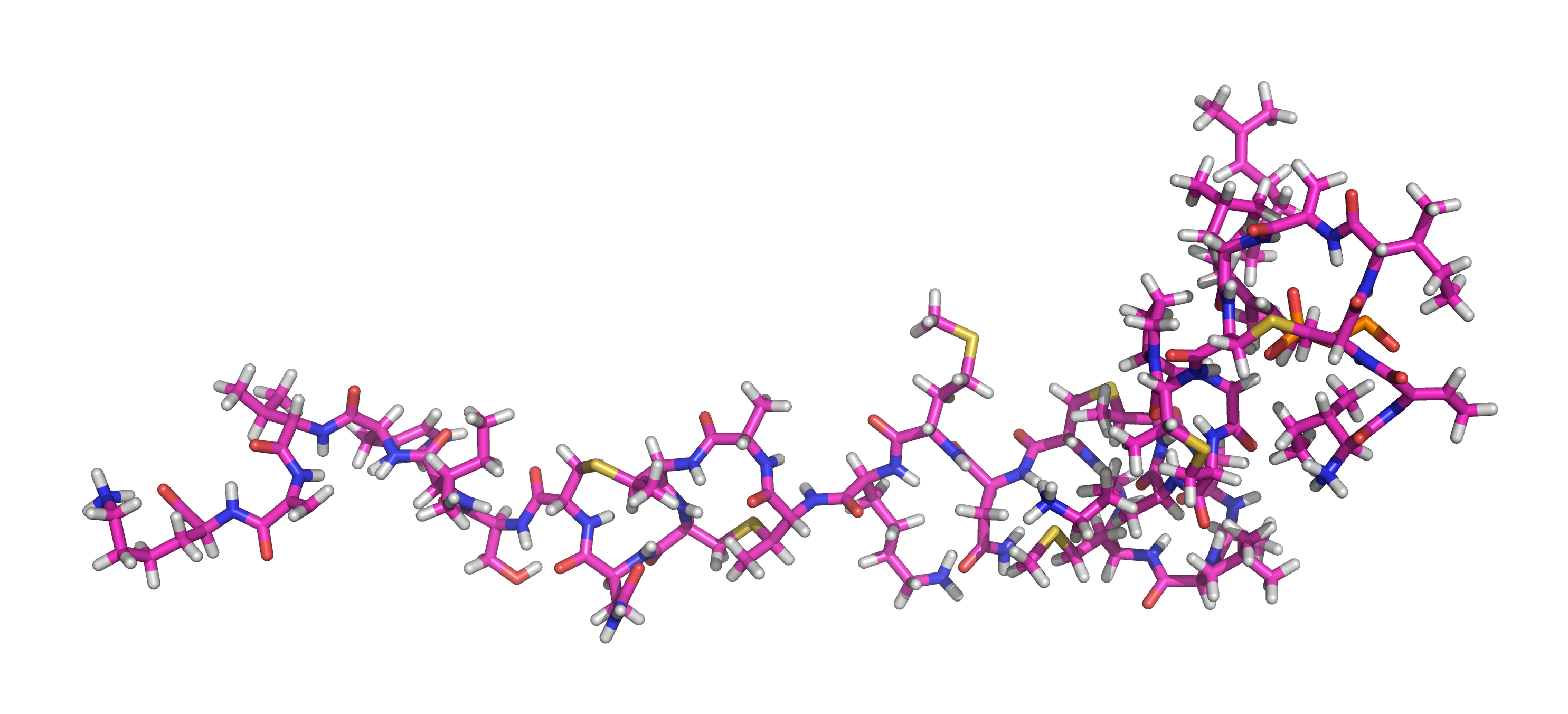
3D stick model of nisin, a particularly effective preservative produced by some lactic acid bacteria.

Biopreservation is the use of natural or controlled microbiota or antimicrobials as a way of preserving food and extending its shelf life. The biopreservation of food, especially utilizing lactic acid bacteria (LAB) that are inhibitory to food spoilage microbes, has been practiced since early ages, at first unconsciously but eventually with an increasingly robust scientific foundation. Beneficial bacteria or the fermentation products produced by these bacteria are used in biopreservation to control spoilage and render pathogens inactive in food. There are a various modes of action through which microorganisms can interfere with the growth of others such as organic acid production, resulting in a reduction of pH and the antimicrobial activity of the un-dissociated acid molecules, a wide variety of small inhibitory molecules including hydrogen peroxide, etc. It is a benign ecological approach which is gaining increasing attention.

== Biopreservative agents and modes of action ==
=== Lactic acid bacteria ===
Of special interest are lactic acid bacteria (LAB). Lactic acid bacteria have antagonistic properties which make them particularly useful as biopreservatives. When LABs compete for nutrients, their metabolites often include active antimicrobials such as lactic and acetic acid, hydrogen peroxide, and peptide bacteriocins. Some LABs produce the antimicrobial nisin which is a particularly effective preservative.

These days LAB bacteriocins are used as an integral part of hurdle technology. Using them in combination with other preservative techniques can effectively control spoilage bacteria and other pathogens, and can inhibit the activities of a wide spectrum of organisms, including inherently resistant Gram-negative bacteria. Lactic acid bacteria and propionibacteria have been extensively studied for their efficiency against spoilage causing yeasts and molds in food spoilage.

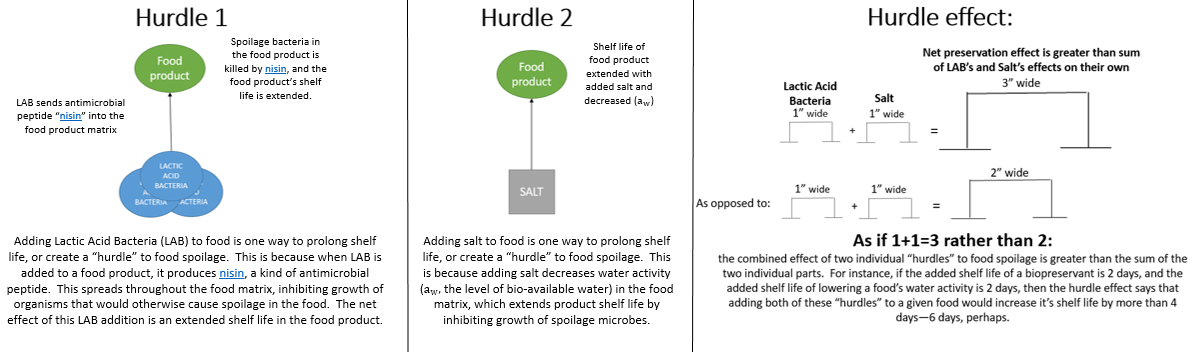
This figure illustrates the pathway of food preservation followed by lactic acid bacteria involving nisin, as well as the pathway of food preservation followed by salt. Additionally, the hurdle effect of food preservation, such as by adding lactic acid bacteria and salt to a food product, is illustrated and described.

=== Yeast ===
In addition to lactic acid bacteria, yeasts also have been reported to have a biopreservation effect due to their antagonistic activities relying on the competition for nutrients, production and tolerance of high concentrations of ethanol, as well as the synthesis of a large class of antimicrobial compounds exhibiting large spectrum of activity against food spoilage microorganisms, but also against plant, animal and human pathogen.

A bacterium/yeast that is a suitable candidate for use as a biopreservative does not necessarily have to ferment the food. However, if conditions are suitable for microbial growth, then a biopreservative bacterium will compete well for nutrients with the spoilage and pathogenic bacteria in the food. As a product of its metabolism, it should also produce acids and other antimicrobial agents, particularly bacteriocins. Biopreservative bacteria, such as lactic acid bacteria, must be harmless to humans.

=== Bacteriophages ===
Bacteriophages (Greek for 'bacteria eater'), or simply phages, are viruses which infect bacteria. The idea of using phages against unwanted bacteria developed shortly after their discovery. With the improvements in organic chemistry during the 1950s, exploration and development of broad spectrum antibiotics displaced interest in bacteriophage research. Several laboratories have been testing suitability of bacteriophage isolates to control certain bacterial pathogens. Significant advancements in this research have been made at the Bacteriophage Institute in Tbilisi, Georgia, where phage therapy is routinely applied in medicine research. Today treatment of antibiotic resistant bacteria is a challenging task. Recently, research on bacteriophages has gained additional momentum in light of the identification of antibiotic-resistant pathogens of infectious diseases, wherein the application of antibiotics is not effectively working, therefore research on the application of bacteriophages is being reviewed intensely. Bacteriophages have recently received a generally recognized as safe status based on their lack of toxicity and other detrimental effects to human health for application in meat products in the USA.

Phage preparations specific for L. monocytogenes, E. coli O157:H7, and S. enterica serotypes have been commercialized and approved for application in foods or as part of surface decontamination protocols.

== Meat biopreservation ==
In meat processing, biopreservation has been extensively studied in fermented meat products and ready to eat meat products. The use of native or artificially introduced microbial population to improve animal health and productivity, and/or to reduce pathogenic organisms, has been termed a probiotic or competitive enhancement approach. Competitive enhancement strategies that have been developed include competitive exclusion, addition of a microbial supplement (probiotic) that improves gastrointestinal health, and adding a limiting, non-host digestible nutrient (prebiotic) that provides an existing (or introduced) commensal microbial population a competitive advantage in the gastrointestinal tract. Each of these approaches utilizes the activities of the native microbial ecosystem against pathogens by capitalizing on the natural microbial competition. Generally speaking, competitive enhancement strategies offer a natural 'green' method to reduce pathogens in the gut of food animals.

== Seafood biopreservation ==
Fishery products are a source of wide variety of valuable nutrients such as proteins, vitamins, minerals, omega-3 fatty acids, taurine, etc. Fishery products, however, are also associated with human intoxication and infection. Approximately 10 to 20% of food-borne illnesses are attributed to fish consumption. Changing consumer demand has driven the appeal of traditional processes applied to seafood (e.g. salting, smoking and canning) lower compared to mild technologies involving lower salt content, lower cooking temperature and vacuum packing (VP)/modified atmosphere packing (MAP). These products, designed as lightly preserved fish products (LPFP), are usually produced from fresh seafood and further processing increases risk of cross contamination. These milder treatments are usually not sufficient to destroy microorganisms, and in some cases psychrotolerant pathogenic and spoilage bacteria can develop during the extended shelf-life of LPFP. Many of these products are also eaten raw, so minimizing the presence and preventing growth of microorganisms is essential for the food quality and safety. The microbial safety and stability of food are based on an application of preservative factors called hurdles. The delicate texture and flavor of seafood are very sensitive to the decontamination technologies such as cooking, and more recent mild technologies such as pulsed light, high pressure, ozone, and ultrasound. Chemical preservatives, which are not processes but ingredients, are out of favor with consumers due to natural preservatives demand. An alternative solution that is gaining more and more attention is biopreservation technology. In fish processing, biopreservation is achieved by adding antimicrobials or by increasing the acidity of the fish muscle. Most bacteria stop multiplying when the pH is less than 4.5. Traditionally, acidity has been increased by fermentation, marination or by directly adding acetic, citric or lactic acid to food products. Other preservatives include nitrites, sulphites, sorbates, benzoates and essential oils. The main reason for less documented studies for application of protective microorganisms, bacteriophages or bacteriocins on seafood products for biopreservation compared to dairy or meat products is probably that the early stages of biopreservation have occurred mainly in fermented foodstuffs that are not so developed among seafood products. The selection of potential protective bacteria in seafood products is challenging due to the fact that they need adaptation to the seafood matrix (poor in sugar and their metabolic activities should not change the initial characteristics of the product, i.e. by acidification, and not induce spoilage that could lead to a sensory rejection. Among the microbiota identified in fresh or processed seafood, LAB remains the category that offers the highest potential for direct application as a bioprotective culture or for bacteriocin production.

== Commercial applications and products ==
There has been successful implementation of various phage preparation around the globe. Various applications/delivery methods in food have been developed. Bacteriophages and their endolysins can be incorporated into food systems in several ways such as spraying, dipping or immobilization, singly or in combination with other hurdles. The phage preparation LMP-1O2 has been subsequently commercialized as "ListShield" Intralyx, Inc. It has been shown to be effective against 170 different strains of L. monocytogenes, reducing significantly (10 to 1000-fold) the Listeria contamination when sprayed onto ready-to-eat foods, without changing the food general composition, taste, odor or color. The Intralytix company has also commercialized phage-based antimicrobial preparations like SalmoFresh and SalmoLyse for controlling S. enterica. SalmoFresh is prepared with a cocktail of naturally occurring lytic bacteriophages that selectively and specifically kill Salmonella, including strains belonging to the most common/highly pathogenic serotypes Typhimurium, Enteritidis, Heidelberg, Newport, Hadar, Kentucky and Thompson. According to the manufacturer, SalmoFresh is specifically designed for treating foods that are at high risk for Salmonella contamination. In particular, red meat and poultry can be treated prior to grinding for significant reductions in Salmonella contamination. SalmoLyse is a reformulated phage cocktail derived from SalmoFresh in which two of the six phages in the original cocktail have been replaced. Additional bacteriophage preparations have been formulated and referenced to be used to reduce the microbial load of animals prior to slaughter and are commercially available from Omnilytics such as the BacWash product line against Salmonella Omnilytics. Another commercial application has been developed, Listex_ P100 by Micreos in the Netherlands and was granted generally recognized as safe (GRAS) status by the FDA and USDA for use in all food products.

Another significant commercial bacteriophage application is ELICOSALI, a wide range of anti-Salmonella and "E. coli" phage cocktail, for treatment of agricultural products developed by Eliava Institute at Tbilisi, Republic of Georgia Eliava Institute.

== Safety ==
Biopreservation judiciously exploits the antimicrobial potential of naturally occurring microorganisms in food and/or their metabolites with a long history of safe use. Bacteriocins, bacteriophages and bacteriophage-encoded enzymes fall in this theory. The long and traditional role of lactic acid bacteria on food and feed fermentations is the main factor related to the use of bacteriocins in biopreservation. LAB and their bacteriocins have been consumed unintentionally for ages, laying down a long history of safe use. Their antimicrobial spectrum of inhibition, bactericidal mode of action, relative tolerance to processing conditions (pH, NaCl, heat treatments) and the lack of toxicity towards eukaryotic cells enforces their role as biopreservatives in food. The evaluation of any new antimicrobial actives is done in meat by USDA which relies on the GRAS assessment by FDA among other suitability data.
