= Shelf-stable food =

Foods that can be stored at room temperature

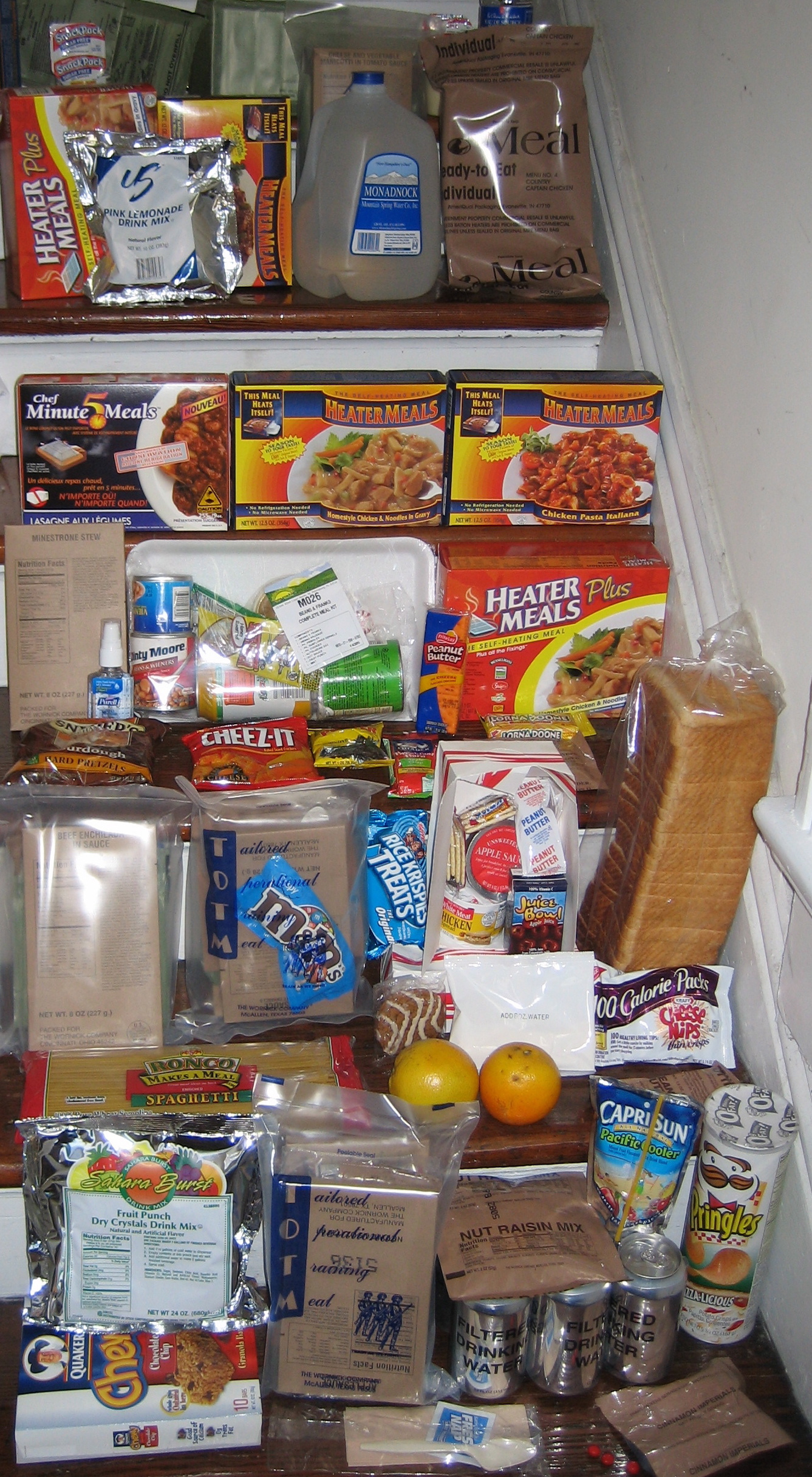
Several shelf-stable foods distributed to households following Hurricane Katrina in New Orleans, Louisiana, United States. Some perishable foods such as oranges and bread were only distributed at the end of October 2005, 2 months after the disaster.

Shelf-stable food (also called non-perishable food, non-perishable(s), or ambient food) is food of a type that can be safely stored at room temperature in a sealed container. This includes foods that would normally be stored refrigerated, but which have been processed so that they can be safely stored at room or ambient temperature for a usefully long shelf life.

Various food preservation and packaging techniques are used to extend a food's shelf life. Decreasing the amount of available water in a product, increasing its acidity, or irradiating or otherwise sterilizing the food and then sealing it in an air-tight container are all ways of depriving bacteria of suitable conditions in which to thrive. All of these approaches can extend a food's shelf life, often without unacceptably changing its taste or texture.

For some foods, alternative ingredients can be used. Common oils and fats become rancid relatively quickly if not refrigerated; replacing them with hydrogenated oils delays the onset of rancidity, increasing shelf life. This is a common approach in industrial food production, but concerns about health hazards associated with trans fats have led to their strict control in several jurisdictions. Even where trans fats are not prohibited, in many places there are new labeling laws (or rules), which require information to be printed on packages, or to be published elsewhere, about the amount of trans fat contained in certain products.

== Packaging ==
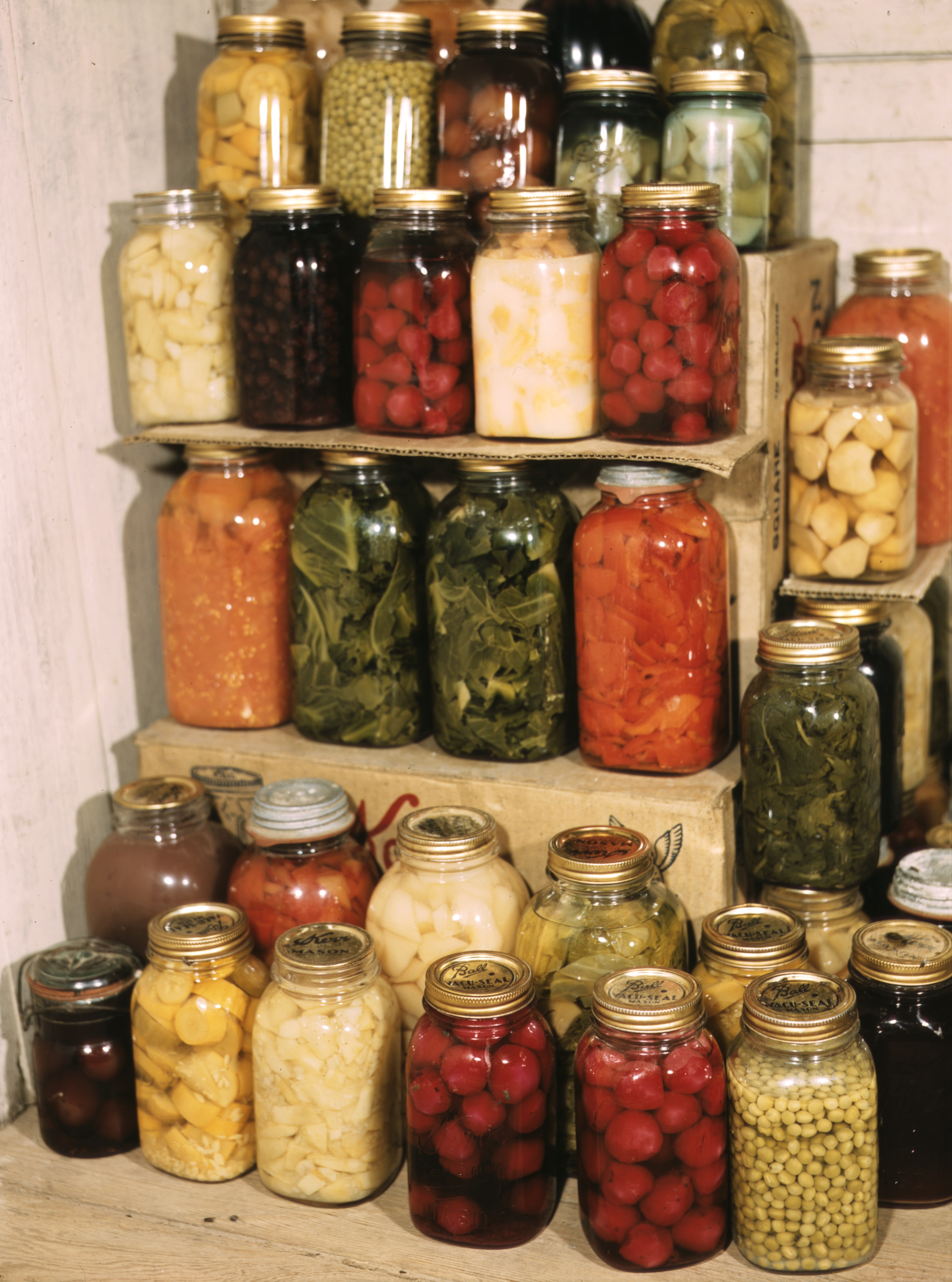
A collection of mason jars filled with preserved foods

Package sterility and seal integrity are vital for commercially packaged shelf-stable food products. With flexible packaging (plastic films, foils, laminates, etc), the choice of materials and process conditions are an important decision for packaging engineers.

All aspects of food production, package filling and sealing must be tightly controlled and meet regulatory requirements. Uniformity, sterility and other requirements are needed to maintain good manufacturing practices.

Product safety management is vital. A complete quality management system must be in place. Verification and validation involves collecting documentary evidence of all aspects of compliance. Quality assurance extends beyond the packaging operations through distribution.

== Examples ==
=== Canning and bottling ===
Commercial canning involves cooking food and sealing it in sterilized tin cans. Home canning (or bottling) uses glass jars, such as Kilner jars or Mason jars, and boiling the containers to sterilize the contents.

=== Retort pouch ===
Retort pouches involve heat processing the food in sterilized heat-stable flexible packages. This is used for camping food and military field rations.

=== Ranch dressing ===
The first shelf-stable formulation of ranch dressing, created in 1983, had a shelf life of 150 days.

=== Milk products ===
Pasteurized milk in aseptically processed cartons (such as Tetra Brik) is shelf-stable without refrigeration.

=== Fruit juice ===
Fruit juice can be processed with proper pasteurization to allow shelf-stable options.

== See also ==
- List of dried foods
- Meal, Ready-to-Eat
- Retort pouch
- Hurdle technology
