= Organoleptic =

Aspects of food experienced through the senses

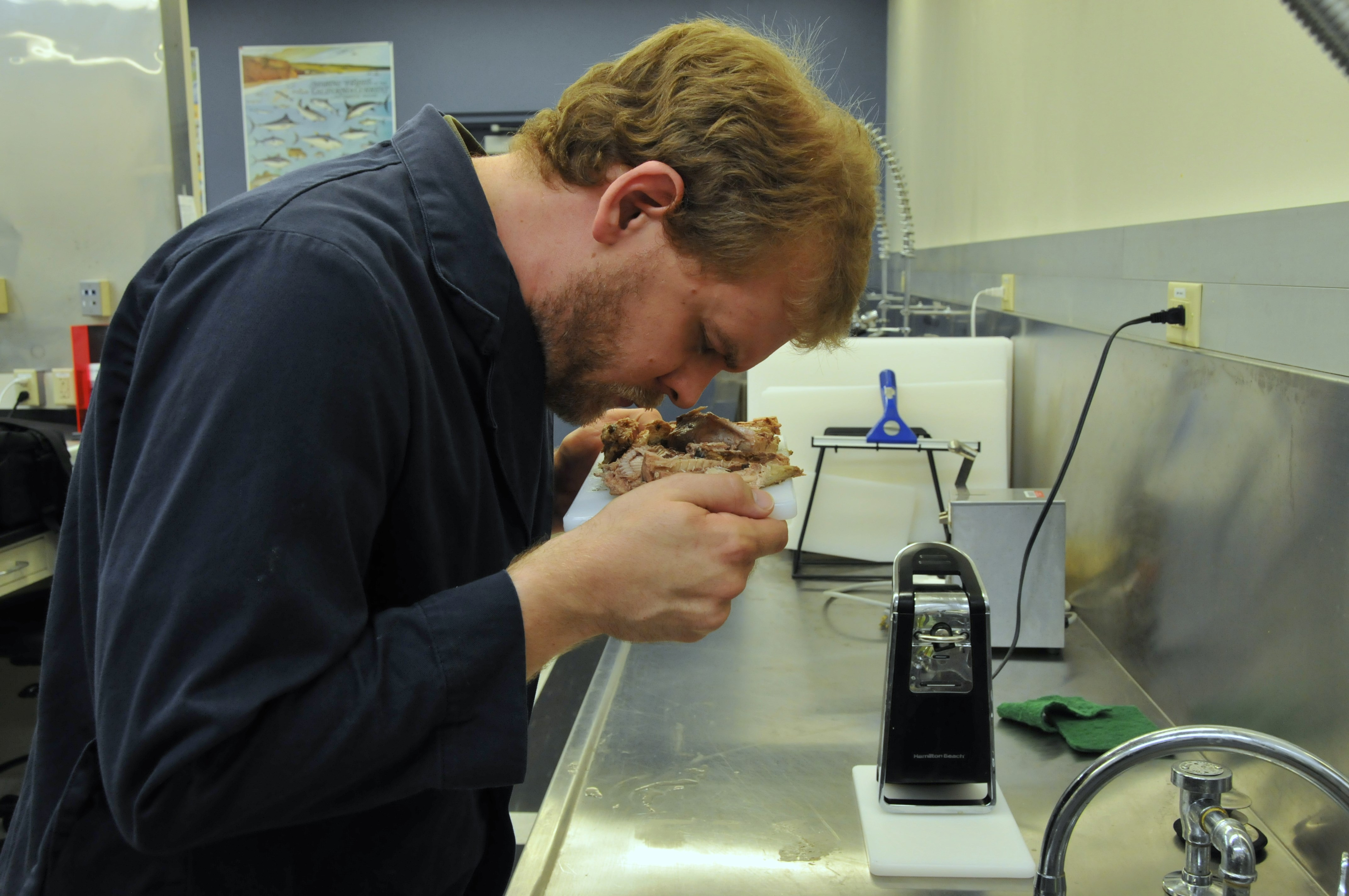
A US Food and Drug Administration sensory analyst sniffs canned mackerel to check for spoilage.

Organoleptic properties are the aspects of food, water or other substances as apprehended via the senses—including taste, sight, smell, and touch.

In traditional U.S. Department of Agriculture meat and poultry inspections, inspectors perform various organoleptic procedures to detect disease or contamination. Such techniques contribute to the effort to detect invisible food-borne pathogens that cause food poisoning.

Organoleptic tests are sometimes conducted to determine if food or pharmaceutical products can transfer tastes or odors to the materials and components they are packaged in. Shelf-life studies often use taste, sight, and smell (in addition to food chemistry and toxicology tests) to determine whether a food product is safe to consume.

Organoleptic analyses are, occasionally, still used when the protocol for a certain sample does not have a high enough sample throughput to meet the demand. In this case, organoleptic analyses serve as a primary screen to determine which samples must be analyzed according to the original method protocol, and which samples need no further sensory analysis.

== Other examples ==
Measurements of chilli spiciness on the Scoville scale depend upon an organoleptic test. The quality of extracts used in phytotherapy is assessed in part using organoleptic tests. Organoleptic qualities are considered part of hurdle technology. Attributes identified organoleptically as part of European Union wine regulations are assessed of wines when they are qualified for a Quality Wine indicator.

Evian water claims that it should be consumed by the expiration date marked on the bottle "to take advantage of the best organoleptic quality".
