= Hurdle technology =

Food production safety method

Hurdle technology is a method of ensuring that pathogens in food products can be eliminated or controlled. This means the food products will be safe for consumption, and their shelf life will be extended. Hurdle technology usually works by combining more than one approach. These approaches can be thought of as "hurdles" the pathogen has to overcome if it is to remain active in the food. The right combination of hurdles can ensure all pathogens are eliminated or rendered harmless in the final product.

Hurdle technology has been defined by Leistner (2000) as an intelligent combination of hurdles which secures the microbial safety and stability as well as the organoleptic and nutritional quality and the economic viability of food products. The organoleptic quality of the food refers to its sensory properties, that is its look, taste, smell and texture.

Examples of hurdles in a food system are high temperature during processing, low temperature during storage, increasing the acidity, lowering the water activity or redox potential, or the presence of preservatives. According to the type of pathogens and how risky they are, the intensity of the hurdles can be adjusted individually to meet consumer preferences in an economical way, without compromising the safety of the product.

Not all hurdles are used simultaneously or applied to every food product. Their effectiveness depends on the intensity of application—higher intensity improves microbial stability, while excessive intensity may negatively impact food quality. For example, traditional heat treatment methods like pasteurization can degrade thermolabile bioactive compounds in fruit juices, reducing their nutritional value. As an alternative, non-thermal preservation techniques based on the hurdle concept offer a promising solution, ensuring food safety while maintaining quality, nutritional integrity, and consumer appeal.

== Hurdles ==
Each hurdle aims to eliminate, inactivate or at least inhibit unwanted microorganisms. Common salt or organic acids can be used as hurdles to control microbials in food. Many natural antimicrobials such as nisin, natamycin and other bacteriocins also work well. As do essential oils derived from rosemary or thyme.

Principal hurdles used for food preservation (after Leistner, 1995)
Parameter	Symbol	Application
High temperature	F	Heating
Low temperature	T	Chilling, freezing
Reduced water activity	a_{w}	Drying, curing, conserving
Increased acidity	pH	Acid addition or formation (pickling)
Reduced redox potential	E_{h}	Removal of oxygen or addition of antioxidants like ascorbate
Biopreservatives		Competitive flora such as microbial fermentation
Other preservatives		Sorbates, sulfites, nitrites

"Traditionally, fermented seafood products common in Japan, provide a typical example of hurdle technology. Fermentation of sushi employs hurdles that favour growth of desirable bacteria but inhibit the growth of pathogens. The important hurdles in the early stages of fermentation are salt and vinegar. Raw fish is cured in salt (20–30%, w/w) for one month before being desalted and pickled in vinegar. The main target of these hurdles is C. botulinum. Growth of lactic acid bacteria during fermentation results in acid production from metabolism of added sugars and rice. The result is a pH hurdle important in controlling growth of C. botulinum."

Types of hurdles used for food preservation (from Ohlsson and Bengtsson, 2002)
Type of hurdle	Examples
Physical	Aseptic packaging, electromagnetic energy (microwave, radio frequency, pulsed magnetic fields, high electric fields), high temperatures (blanching, pasteurization, sterilization, evaporation, extrusion, baking, frying), ionizing radiation, low temperature (chilling, freezing), modified atmospheres, packaging films (including active packaging, edible coatings), photodynamic inactivation, ultra-high pressures, ultrasonication, ultraviolet radiation
Physicochemical	Carbon dioxide, ethanol, lactic acid, lactoperoxidase, low pH, low redox potential, low water activity, Maillard reaction products, organic acids, oxygen, ozone, phenols, phosphates, salt, smoking, sodium nitrite/nitrate, sodium or potassium sulfite, spices and herbs, surface treatment agents
Microbial	Antibiotics, bacteriocins, competitive flora, protective cultures

== Synergistic effects ==
There can be significant synergistic effects between hurdles. For example, Gram-positive bacteria include some of the more important spoilage bacteria, such as Clostridium, Bacillus and Listeria. A synergistic enhancement occurs if nisin is used against these bacteria in combination with antioxidants, organic acids or other antimicrobials. Combining antimicrobial hurdles in an intelligent way means other hurdles can be reduced, yet the resulting food can have superior sensory qualities.

== See also ==
- Biopreservation
