= Water activity =

One of the main factors limiting microbial activity

In food science, water activity (a_{w}) of a food is the ratio of its vapor pressure to the vapor pressure of water at the same temperature, both taken at equilibrium. Pure water has a water activity of one. Put another way, a_{w} is the equilibrium relative humidity (ERH) expressed as a fraction instead of as a percentage. As temperature increases, a_{w} typically increases, except in some products with crystalline salt or sugar.

Water migrates from areas of high a_{w} to areas of low a_{w}. For example, if honey (a_{w} ≈ 0.6) is exposed to humid air (a_{w} ≈ 0.7), the honey absorbs water from the air. If salami (a_{w} ≈ 0.87) is exposed to dry air (a_{w} ≈ 0.5), the salami dries out, which could preserve it or spoil it. Lower a_{w} substances tend to support fewer microorganisms since these get desiccated by the water migration.

Water activity is not simply a function of water concentration in food. The water in food has a tendency to evaporate, but the water vapor in the surrounding air has a tendency to condense into the food. When the two tendencies are in balance— and the air and food are stable—the air's relative humidity (expressed as a fraction instead of as a percentage) is taken to be the water activity, a_{w}. Thus, water activity is the thermodynamic activity of water as solvent and the relative humidity of the surrounding air at equilibrium.

== Formula ==
The definition of a_{w} is
$$a_w \equiv \frac{p}{p^*}$$
where p is the partial water vapor pressure in equilibrium with the solution, and p* is the (partial) vapor pressure of pure water at the same temperature.

An alternate definition can be
$$a_w \equiv l_w x_w$$
where l_{w} is the activity coefficient of water and x_{w} is the mole fraction of water in the aqueous fraction.

Relationship to relative humidity: The relative humidity (RH) of air in equilibrium with a sample is also called the Equilibrium Relative Humidity (ERH) and is usually given as a percentage. It is equal to water activity according to
$$\mathrm{ERH} = a_w \times 100\%.$$
The estimated mold-free shelf life (MFSL) in days at 21 °C depends on water activity according to
$$\mathrm{MFSL} = 10^{7.91 - 8.1 a_w}$$

== Uses ==
Water activity is an important characteristic for food product design and food safety.

=== Food product design ===
Food designers use water activity to formulate shelf-stable food. If a product is kept below a certain water activity, then mold growth is inhibited. This results in a longer shelf life.

Water activity values can also help limit moisture migration within a food product made with different ingredients. If raisins of a higher water activity are packaged with bran flakes of a lower water activity, the water from the raisins migrates to the bran flakes over time, making the raisins hard and the bran flakes soggy. Food formulators use water activity to predict how much moisture migration affects their product.

=== Food safety ===
Water activity is used in many cases as a critical control point for Hazard Analysis and Critical Control Points (HACCP) programs. Samples of the food product are periodically taken from the production area and tested to ensure water activity values are within a specified range for food quality and safety. Measurements can be made in as little as five minutes, and are made regularly in most major food production facilities.

For many years, researchers tried to equate bacterial growth potential with water content. They found that the values were not universal, but specific to each food product. W. J. Scott first established that bacterial growth correlated with water activity, not water content, in 1953. It is firmly established that growth of bacteria is inhibited at specific water activity values. U.S. Food and Drug Administration (FDA) regulations for intermediate moisture foods are based on these values.

Lowering the water activity of a food product should not be seen as a kill step. Studies in powdered milk show that viable cells can exist at much lower water activity values, but that they never grow. Over time, bacterial levels decline.

== Measurement ==
Water activity values are obtained by either a resistive electrolytic, a capacitance or a dew point hygrometer.

=== Resistive electrolytic hygrometers ===
Resistive electrolytic hygrometers use a sensing element in the form of a liquid electrolyte held in between of two small glass rods by capillary force. The electrolyte changes resistance if it absorbs or loses water vapor. The resistance is directly proportional to relative air humidity and therefore also to water activity of the sample (once vapor–liquid equilibrium is established). This relation can be checked by either verification or calibration using saturated salt-water mixtures, which provide a well-defined and reproducible air humidity in the measurement chamber.

The sensor does not have any physically given hysteresis as it is known from capacitance hygrometers and sensors, and does not require regular cleaning as its surface is not the effectively sensing element. Volatiles, in principle, influence the measurement performance—especially those that dissociate in the electrolyte and thereby change its resistance. Such influences can easily be avoided by using chemical protection filters that absorb the volatile compound before arriving at the sensor.

=== Capacitance hygrometers ===
Capacitance hygrometers consist of two charged plates separated by a polymer membrane dielectric. As the membrane adsorbs water, its ability to hold a charge increases and the capacitance is measured. This value is roughly proportional to the water activity as determined by a sensor-specific calibration.

Capacitance hygrometers are not affected by most volatile chemicals and can be much smaller than other alternative sensors. They do not require cleaning, but are less accurate than dew point hygrometers (+/- 0.015 a_{w}). They should have regular calibration checks and can be affected by residual water in the polymer membrane (hysteresis).

=== Dew point hygrometers ===
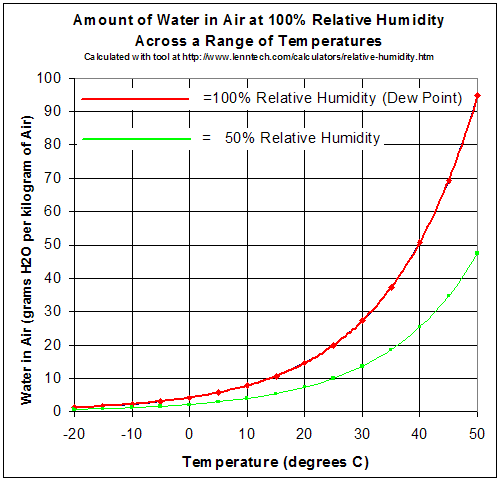
Red line shows saturation

The temperature at which dew forms on a clean surface is directly related to the vapor pressure of the air. Dew point hygrometers work by placing a mirror over a closed sample chamber. The mirror is cooled until the dew point temperature is measured by means of an optical sensor. This temperature is then used to find the relative humidity of the chamber using psychrometrics charts.

This method is theoretically the most accurate (+/- 0.003 a_{w}) and often the fastest. The sensor requires cleaning if debris accumulates on the mirror.

=== Equilibration ===
With either method, vapor–liquid equilibrium must be established in the sample chamber. This takes place over time or can be aided by the addition of a fan in the chamber. Thermal equilibrium must also be achieved unless the sample temperature is measured.

== Moisture content ==
Water activity is related to water content in a non-linear relationship known as a moisture sorption isotherm curve. These isotherms are substance- and temperature-specific. Isotherms can be used to help predict product stability over time in different storage conditions.

== Use in humidity control ==
There is net evaporation from a solution with a water activity greater than the relative humidity of its surroundings. There is net absorption of water by a solution with a water activity less than the relative humidity of its surroundings. Therefore, in an enclosed space, an aqueous solution can be used to regulate humidity.

== Selected a_{w} values ==
Food
Substance	a_{w}	Source
Distilled Water	1.00	
Tap water	0.99	
Raw meats	0.99	
Milk	0.97	
Juice	0.97	
Salami	0.87	
Shelf-stable cooked bacon	< 0.85	
Saturated NaCl solution	0.75	
Point at which cereal loses crunch	0.65	
Dried fruit	0.60	
Typical indoor air	0.5 - 0.7	
Honey	0.5 - 0.7	
Peanut Butter	≤ 0.35	

Minimum a_{w} limits for microorganisms
Microorganism Inhibited	a_{w}	Source
Clostridium botulinum E	0.97	
Pseudomonas fluorescens	0.97	
Clostridium perfringens	0.95	
Escherichia coli	0.95	
Clostridium botulinum A, B	0.94	
Salmonella	0.93	
Vibrio cholerae	0.95	
Bacillus cereus	0.93	
Listeria monocytogenes	0.92, (0.90 in 30% glycerol)	
Bacillus subtilis	0.91	
Staphylococcus aureus	0.86	
Most molds	0.80	
No microbial proliferation	<0.60	

== Solar planets habitability ==
Water is necessary for life under all its forms presently known on Earth. Without water, microbial activity is not possible. Even if some micro-organisms can be preserved in the dry state (e.g., after freeze-drying), their growth is not possible without water.

Micro-organisms also require sufficient space to develop. In highly compacted bentonite and deep clay formations, microbial activity is limited by the lack of space and the transport of nutrients towards bacteria and the elimination of toxins produced by their metabolism is controlled by diffusion in the pore water. So, "space and water restrictions" are two limiting factors of the microbial activity in deep sediments. Early biotic diagenesis of sediments just below the ocean floor driven by microbial activity (e.g., of sulfate reducing bacteria) end up when the degree of compaction becomes too important to allow microbial life development.

At the surface of planets and in their atmosphere, space restrictions do not apply, therefore, the ultimate limiting factor is water availability and thus the water activity.

Most extremophile micro-organisms require sufficient water to be active. The threshold of water activity for their development is around 0.6. The same rule should also apply for other planets than Earth. After the tantalizing detection of phosphine (PH_{3}) in the atmosphere of Venus, in the absence of known and plausible chemical mechanism to explain the formation of this molecule, the presence of micro-organisms in suspension in Venus's atmosphere has been suspected and the hypothesis of the microbial formation of phosphine has been formulated by Greaves et al. (2020) from Cardiff University envisaging the possibility of a liveable window in the Venusian clouds at a certain altitude with an acceptable temperature range for microbial life.

Hallsworth et al. (2021) from the School of Biological Sciences at Queen's University Belfast have studied the conditions required to support the life of extremophile micro-organisms in the clouds at high altitude in the Venus atmosphere where favorable temperature conditions might prevail. Beside the presence of sulfuric acid in the clouds which already represent a major challenge for the survival of most micro-organisms, they came to the conclusion that the atmosphere of Venus is much too dry to host microbial life. Indeed, Hallsworth et al. (2021) have determined a water activity of ≤ 0.004, two orders of magnitude below the 0.585 limit for known extremophiles. So, with a water activity in the Venus clouds 100 times lower than the threshold of 0.6 known in Earth conditions, the hypothesis envisaged by Greaves et al. (2020) to explain the biotic origin of phosphine in the Venus atmosphere is ruled out.

Direct measurements of the Venusian atmosphere by spatial probes point to very harsh conditions, likely making Venus an uninhabitable world, even for the most extreme forms of life known on Earth. The extremely low water activity of the desiccated Venusian atmosphere represents the very limiting factor for life, much more severe than the infernal conditions of temperature and pressure, or the presence of sulfuric acid.

Astrobiologists presently consider that more favorable conditions could be encountered in the clouds of Jupiter where a sufficient water activity could prevail in the atmosphere provided that other conditions necessary for life are also met in the same environment (sufficient supply of nutrients and energy in a non-toxic medium).
