= Freeze drying =

Low-temperature dehydration process

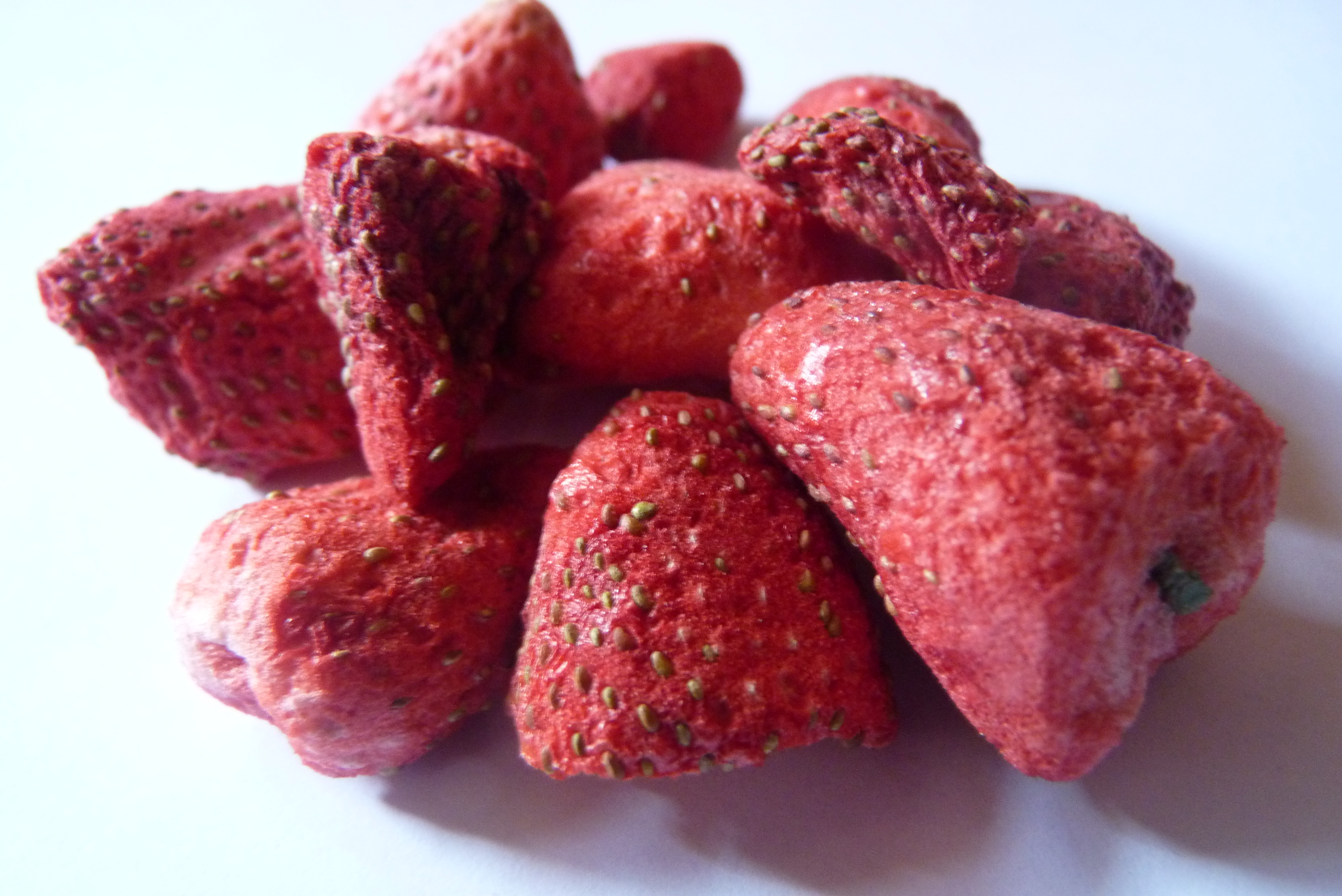
Freeze-dried strawberries

Freeze drying, also known as lyophilization or cryodesiccation, is a low-temperature dehydration process that involves freezing the product and lowering pressure, thereby removing the ice by sublimation. This is in contrast to dehydration by most conventional methods that evaporate water using heat.

Because of the low temperatures used in processing, the rehydrated product retains many of its original qualities. When solid objects like strawberries are freeze dried the original shape of the product is maintained. If the product to be dried is a liquid, as often seen in pharmaceutical applications, the properties of the final product are optimized by the combination of excipients (i.e., inactive ingredients). Primary applications of freeze drying include biological (e.g., bacteria and yeasts), biomedical (e.g., surgical transplants), food processing (e.g., coffee), and food preservation.

== History ==
The Inca were freeze drying potatoes into chuño since the 13th century. The process involved multiple cycles of exposing potatoes to below freezing temperatures on mountain peaks in the Andes during the evening, and squeezing water out and drying them in the sunlight during the day. The Inca people also used the unique climate of the Altiplano to freeze dry meat. The Japanese koya-dofu, freeze-dried tofu, dates to the mid-1500s in Nagano and the 1600s on Mount Koya. These methods are similar but not technically equivalent to the modern process of freeze-drying which requires access to both refrigeration and vacuum systems.

Modern freeze drying began as early as 1890 by Richard Altmann, who devised a method to freeze dry tissues (either plant or animal), but went virtually unnoticed until the 1930s. In 1909, L. F. Shackell independently created the vacuum chamber by using an electrical pump. No further freeze drying information was documented until Tival in 1927 and Elser in 1934 had patented freeze drying systems with improvements to freezing and condenser steps.

A significant turning point for freeze drying occurred during World War II when blood plasma and penicillin were needed to treat the wounded in the field. Because of the lack of refrigerated transport, many serum supplies spoiled before reaching their recipients. The freeze-drying process was developed as a commercial technique that enabled blood plasma and penicillin to be rendered chemically stable and viable without refrigeration. In the 1950s–1960s, freeze drying began to be viewed as a multi-purpose tool for both pharmaceuticals and food processing.

In 2020, freeze dried candy saw a major surge in popularity in the USA due to viral popularity on social media with freeze dried versions of popular candies such as Skittles, Nerd Gummy Clusters, and SweeTarts appearing in stores.

=== Early uses in food ===
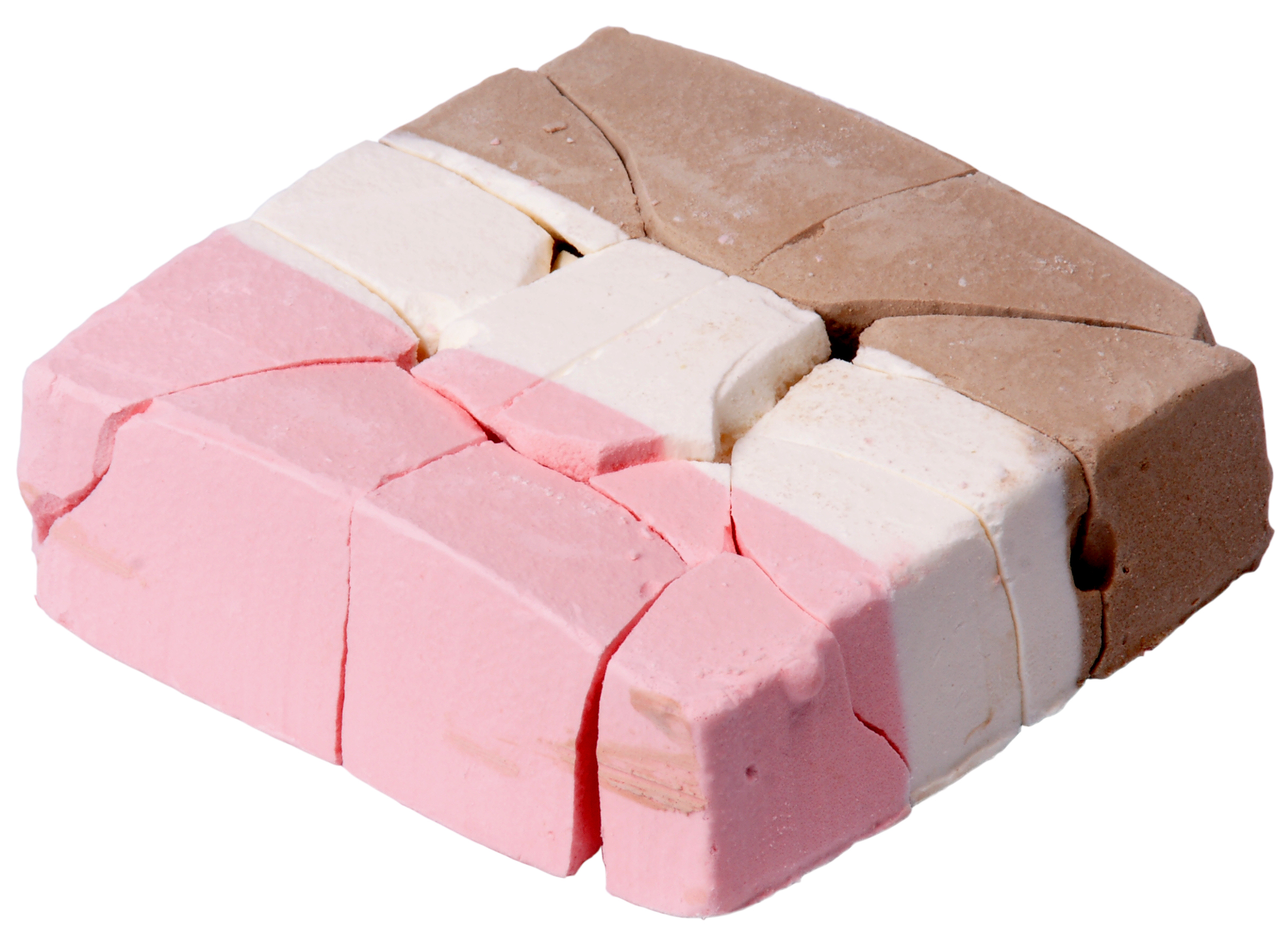
Freeze-dried ice cream

Freeze-dried foods became a major component of astronaut and military rations. What began for astronaut crews as tubed meals and freeze-dried snacks that were difficult to rehydrate, were transformed into hot meals by improving the process of rehydrating freeze-dried meals with water. As technology and food processing improved, NASA looked for ways to provide a complete nutrient profile while reducing crumbs, disease-producing bacteria, and toxins. The crumb problem was solved with the addition of a gelatin coating on the foods to lock in and prevent crumbs. The complete nutrient profile was improved with the addition of an algae-based vegetable-like oil to add polyunsaturated fatty acids. Polyunsaturated fatty acids are beneficial in mental and vision development and, as they remain stable during space travel, can provide astronauts with added benefits. Disease-producing bacteria and toxins were reduced by quality control and the development of the Hazard Analysis and Critical Control Points (HACCP) plan, which is widely used today to evaluate food material before, during, and after processing. With the combination of these three innovations, NASA could provide safe and wholesome foods to their crews from freeze-dried meals.

Military rations have also come a long way, from being served cured pork and corn meal to beefsteaks with mushroom gravy. How rations are chosen and developed is based on acceptance, nutrition, wholesomeness, producibility, cost, and sanitation. Additional requirements for rations include having a minimum shelf life of three years, being deliverable by air, being consumable in worldwide environments, and providing a complete nutritional profile. The new T-rations have been improved upon by increasing acceptable items and provide high quality meals while in the field. Freeze-dried coffee was also incorporated by replacing spray-dried coffee in the Meal, Ready-to-Eat category.

== Stages ==
In a typical phase diagram, the boundary between gas and liquid runs from the triple point to the critical point. Freeze-drying (blue arrow) brings the system around the triple point, avoiding the direct liquid–gas transition seen in ordinary drying (green arrow).

There are four stages in the complete freeze drying process: pretreatment, freezing, primary drying, and secondary drying.

=== Pretreatment ===
Pretreatment includes any method of treating the product prior to freezing. This may include concentrating the product, formulation revision (i.e., addition of components to increase stability, preserve appearance, and/or improve processing), decreasing a high-vapor-pressure solvent, or increasing the surface area. Food pieces are often IQF treated to make them free flowing prior to freeze drying. Freeze dried pharmaceutical products are in most cases parenterals administered after reconstitution by injection which need to be sterile as well as free of impurity particles. Pre-treatment in these cases consists of solution preparation followed by a multi-step filtration. Afterwards the liquid is filled under sterile conditions into the final containers which in production scale freeze dryers are loaded automatically to the shelves.

In many instances the decision to pretreat a product is based on theoretical knowledge of freeze-drying and its requirements, or is demanded by cycle time or product quality considerations.

=== Freezing and annealing ===
During the freezing stage, the material is cooled below its triple point, the temperature at which the solid, liquid, and gas phases of the material can coexist. This ensures that sublimation rather than melting will occur in the following steps. To facilitate faster and more efficient freeze drying, larger ice crystals are preferable. The large ice crystals form a network within the product which promotes faster removal of water vapor during sublimation. To produce larger crystals, the product should be frozen slowly or can be cycled up and down in temperature in a process called annealing. The freezing phase is the most critical in the whole freeze-drying process, as the freezing method can impact the speed of reconstitution, duration of freeze-drying cycle, product stability, and appropriate crystallization.

Amorphous materials do not have a eutectic point, but they do have a critical point, below which the product must be maintained to prevent melt-back or collapse during primary and secondary drying.

==== Structurally sensitive goods ====
In the case of goods where preservation of structure is required, like food or objects with formerly-living cells, large ice crystals break the cell walls, resulting in increasingly poor texture and loss of nutrients. In this case, rapidly freezing the material to below its eutectic point avoids the formation of large ice crystals. Usually, the freezing temperatures are between −50 °C (−58 °F) and −80 °C (−112 °F).

=== Primary drying ===
During the primary drying phase, the pressure is lowered (to the range of a few millibars), and enough heat is supplied to the material for the ice to sublimate. The amount of heat necessary can be calculated using the sublimating molecules' latent heat of sublimation. In this initial drying phase, about 95% of the water in the material is sublimated. This phase may be slow (can be several days in the industry), because, if too much heat is added, the material's structure could be altered.

In this phase, pressure is controlled through the application of partial vacuum. The vacuum speeds up the sublimation, making it useful as a deliberate drying process. Furthermore, a cold condenser chamber and/or condenser plates provide a surface(s) for the water vapor to re-liquify and solidify on.

In this range of pressure, the heat is brought mainly by conduction or radiation; the convection effect is negligible, due to the low air density.

=== Secondary drying ===
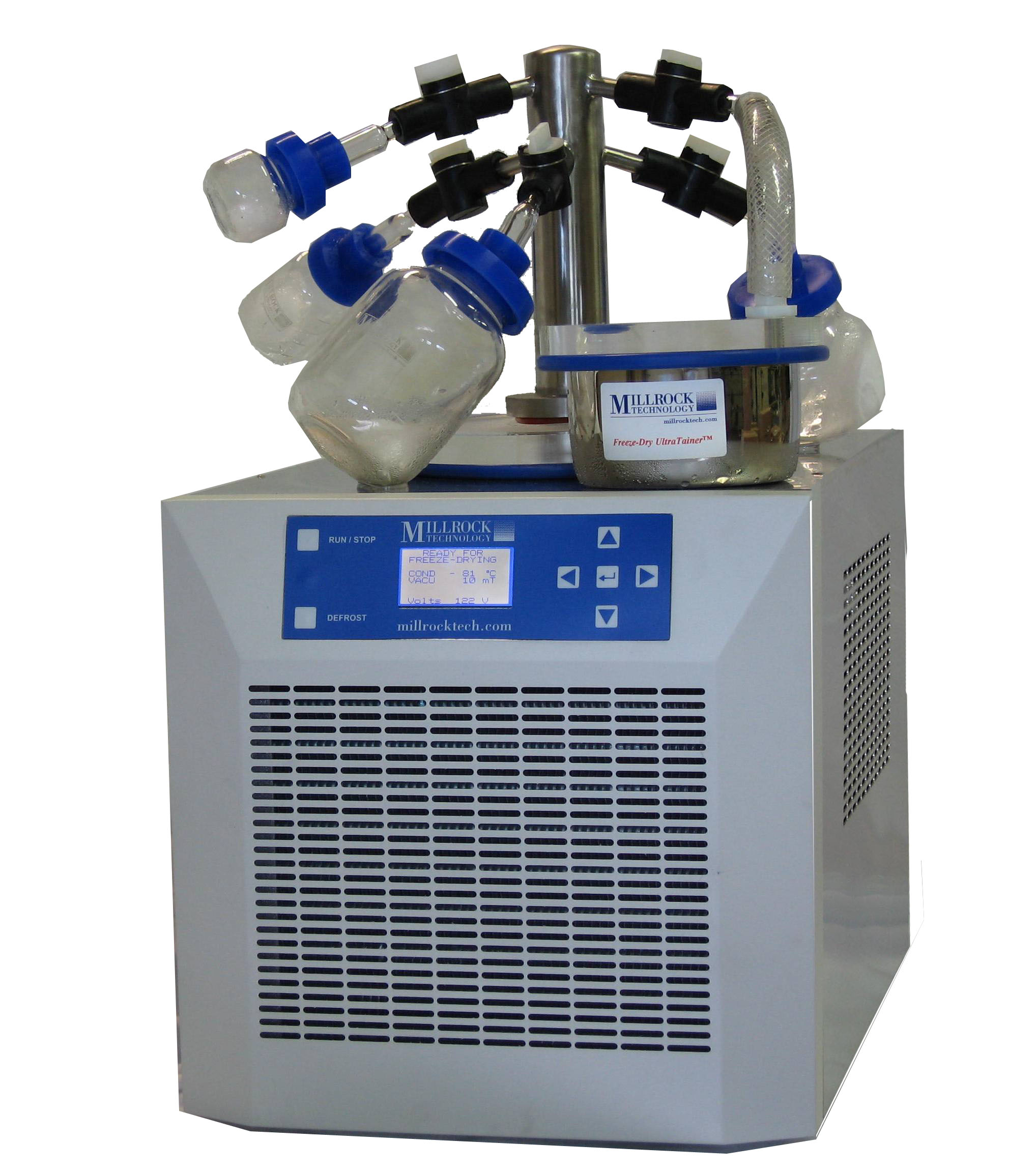
A benchtop manifold freeze-drier

The secondary drying phase aims to remove unfrozen water molecules, since the ice was removed in the primary drying phase. This part of the freeze-drying process is governed by the material's adsorption isotherms. In this phase, the temperature is raised higher than in the primary drying phase, and can even be above 0 °C (32 °F), to break any physico-chemical interactions that have formed between the water molecules and the frozen material. Usually the pressure is also lowered in this stage to encourage desorption (typically in the range of microbars, or fractions of a pascal). However, there are products that benefit from increased pressure as well.

After the freeze-drying process is complete, the vacuum is usually broken with an inert gas, such as nitrogen, before the material is sealed.

At the end of the operation, the final residual water content in the product is extremely low, around 1–4%.

== Applications ==
Freeze-drying causes less damage to the substance than other dehydration methods using higher temperatures. Nutrient factors that are sensitive to heat are lost less in the process as compared to the processes incorporating heat treatment for drying purposes. Freeze-drying does not usually cause shrinkage or toughening of the material being dried. In addition, flavors, smells, and nutritional content generally remain unchanged, making the process popular for preserving food. However, water is not the only chemical capable of sublimation, and the loss of other volatile compounds such as acetic acid (vinegar) and alcohols can yield undesirable results.

Freeze-dried products can be rehydrated (reconstituted) much more quickly and easily because the process leaves microscopic pores. The pores are created by the ice crystals that sublimate, leaving gaps or pores in their place. This is especially important when it comes to pharmaceutical uses. Freeze-drying can also be used to increase the shelf life of some pharmaceuticals for many years.

=== Pharmaceuticals and biotechnology ===
Lyophilized 5% sucrose cake in a pharmaceutical glass vial

Pharmaceutical companies use freeze-drying to increase the shelf life of some products, such as live virus vaccines, biologics, and other injectables. By removing the water from the material and sealing the material in a glass vial, the material can be easily stored, shipped, and later reconstituted to its original form for injection. Another example from the pharmaceutical industry is the use of freeze drying to produce tablets or wafers, the advantage of which is less excipient as well as a rapidly absorbed and easily administered dosage form.

Freeze-dried pharmaceutical products are produced as lyophilized powders for reconstitution in vials, and more recently in prefilled syringes for self-administration by a person.

Examples of lyophilized pharmaceutical drugs include:

- Vancomycin, an intravenous antibiotic for treatment of complicated skin infections, bloodstream infections, endocarditis, bone and joint infections, and meningitis.
- Alteplase, an intravenous "blood clot buster" used for treatment of ischemic stroke.
- Carmustine, a chemotherapy drug used for treatment of glioblastoma, brainstem glioma, and other brain tumors.

=== Biological products ===
Examples of lyophilized biological products include:

- Many vaccines such as live measles virus vaccine, typhoid vaccine, and meningococcal polysaccharide vaccine groups A and C combined.
- Therapeutic proteins including antihemophilic factor VIII, interferon alfa, anti-blood clot medicine streptokinase, and wasp venom allergenic extract.
  - This also include antibodies, some of which are blockbuster drugs: etanercept (Enbrel by Amgen), infliximab (Remicade by Janssen Biotech), rituximab, and trastuzumab (Herceptin by Genentech).
- Cell extracts that support cell-free biotechnology applications such as point-of-care diagnostics and biomanufacturing are also freeze-dried to improve stability under room temperature storage.

Lyophilized biologics can be pressed into pellets and tablets for anhydrous and high-density, solid-state storage of biological products.

In bioseparations, freeze-drying can be used also as a late-stage purification procedure, because it can effectively remove solvents. Furthermore, it is capable of concentrating substances with low molecular weights that are too small to be removed by a filtration membrane. Freeze-drying is a relatively expensive process. The equipment is about three times as expensive as the equipment used for other separation processes, and the high energy demands lead to high energy costs. Furthermore, freeze-drying also has a long process time, because the addition of too much heat to the material can cause melting or structural deformations. Therefore, freeze-drying is often reserved for materials that are heat-sensitive, such as proteins, enzymes, microorganisms, and blood plasma. The low operating temperature of the process leads to minimal damage of these heat-sensitive products.

==== Live material ====
Some live cell cultures can be freeze-dried, stored for an extended period, and then reconstituted into a live, functional state. An excipient, more specifically a cryoprotectant, may be required.

- Prokaryotes and yeast are relatively easy to freeze-dry and then resuscitate.
  - In bacteriology freeze-drying is used to conserve special strains.
  - Dry powders of probiotics are often produced by bulk freeze-drying of live microorganisms such as lactic acid bacteria and bifidobacteria.
  - Live vaccines (described above) are also examples of this class.
- The simpler blood cells (red blood cells and platelets) have been freeze-dried. With the right protection, recovery rates are as high as 90%.
- Spermatozoa are relatively resistant to freeze-drying. Even highly-damaged cells can initiate embryonic development, though direct injection into the egg may be needed. Mouse sperm freeze-dried without any protection has produced live offspring.
- General animal cells are relatively fragile, but trehalose has proven effective in protecting Drosophilia and many lines of mammalian cells during freeze-drying.

Even if the cell is damaged beyond resuscitation, it is preserved. This can be helpful for later research too: although the type strain culture for Vampirovibrio chlorellavorus could not be resuscitated, it contained enough DNA for its genome to be sequenced.

=== Technological industry ===
In chemical synthesis, products are often freeze-dried to make them more stable, or easier to dissolve in water for subsequent use.

In nanotechnology, freeze-drying is used for nanotube purification to avoid aggregation due to capillary forces during regular thermal vaporization drying.

=== Food ===
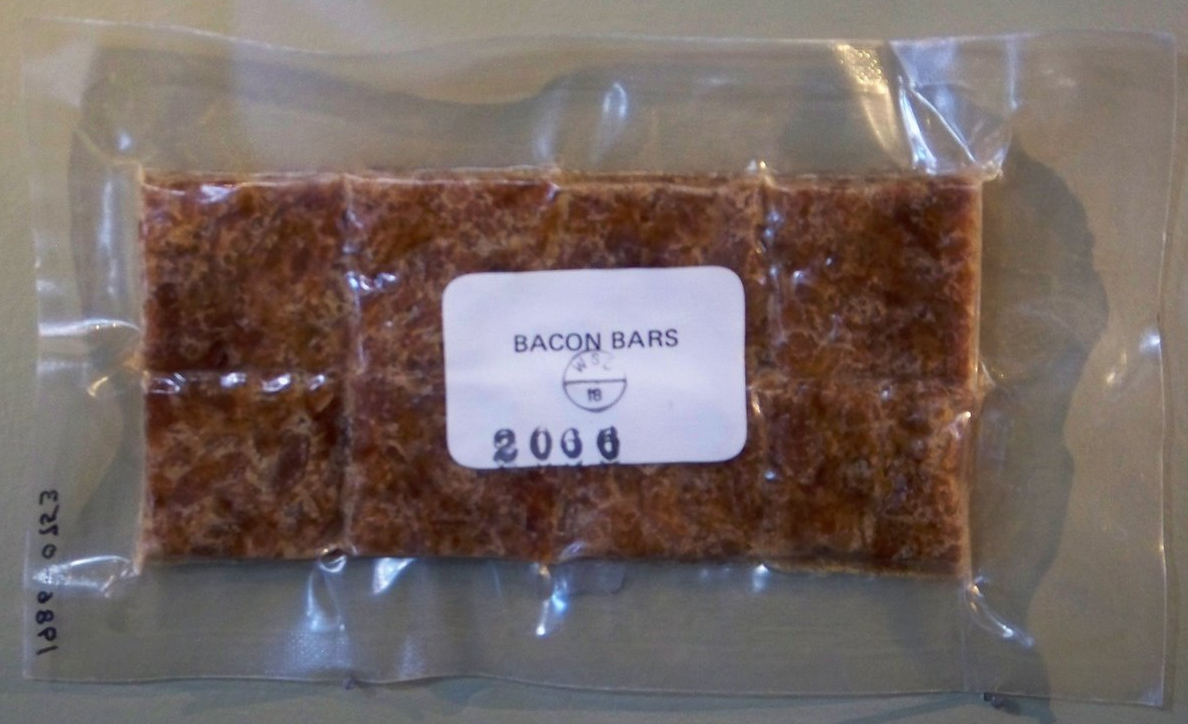
Freeze dried bacon bars

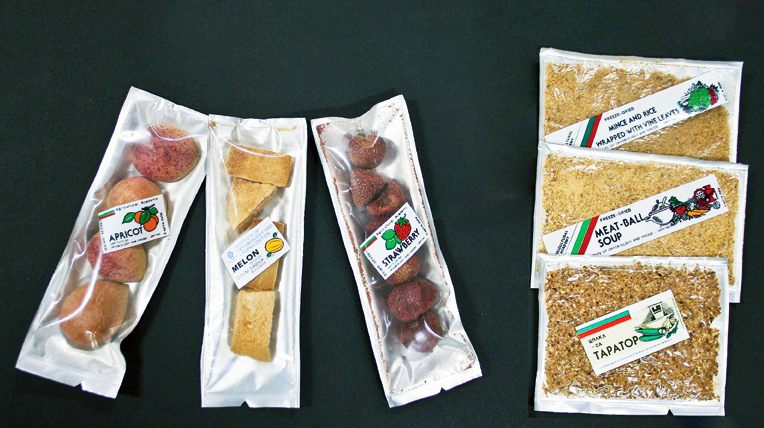
Freeze-dried Bulgarian apricot, melon, meatball soup, tarator

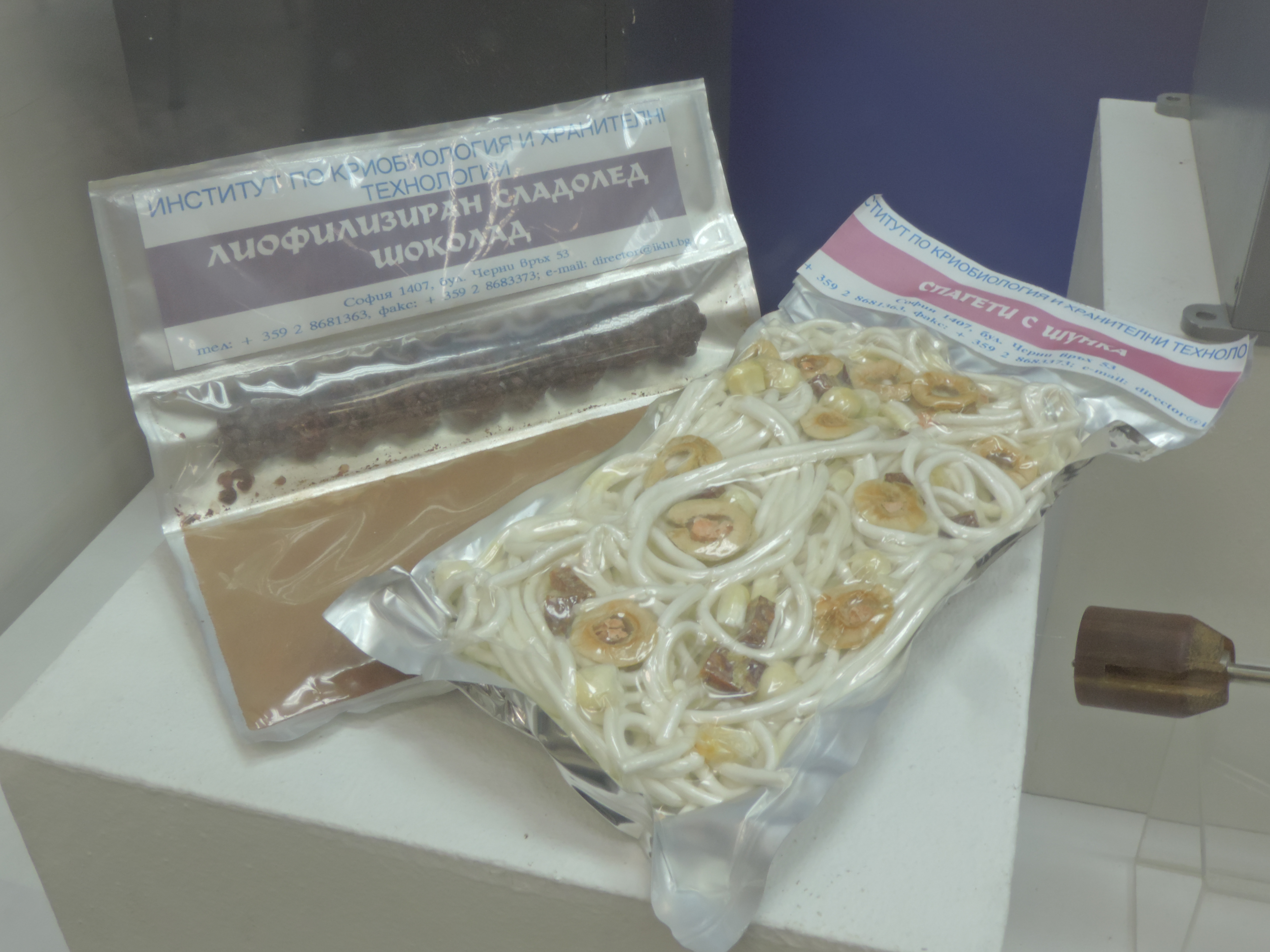
Freeze dried ice cream and chocolate, and spaghetti with bacon

The primary purpose of freeze drying within the food industry is to extend the shelf-life of the food while maintaining the quality. Freeze-drying is known to result in the highest quality of solid foods of all drying techniques because structural integrity is maintained along with preservation of flavors. Because freeze drying is expensive, it is used mainly with high-value products. Examples of high-value freeze-dried products are seasonal fruits and vegetables because of their limited availability, and foods used for military rations, astronauts/cosmonauts, and/or hikers.

Water-based drinks such as coffee and tea are also freeze-dried. Compared to heat-based drying, freeze-drying preserves more volatile aroma compounds. Freeze-drying is also used to make instant soup bricks. It can also preserve raw ingredients such as egg whites for baking.

==== NASA and military rations ====
Because of its light weight per volume of reconstituted food, freeze-dried products are popular and convenient for hikers, as military rations, or astronaut meals. A greater amount of dried food can be carried compared to the same weight of wet food. In replacement of wet food, freeze dried food can easily be rehydrated with water if desired and shelf-life of the dried product is longer than fresh/wet product making it ideal for long trips taken by hikers, military personnel, or astronauts. The development of freeze drying increased meal and snack variety to include items like shrimp cocktail, chicken and vegetables, butterscotch pudding, and apple sauce.

==== Coffee ====
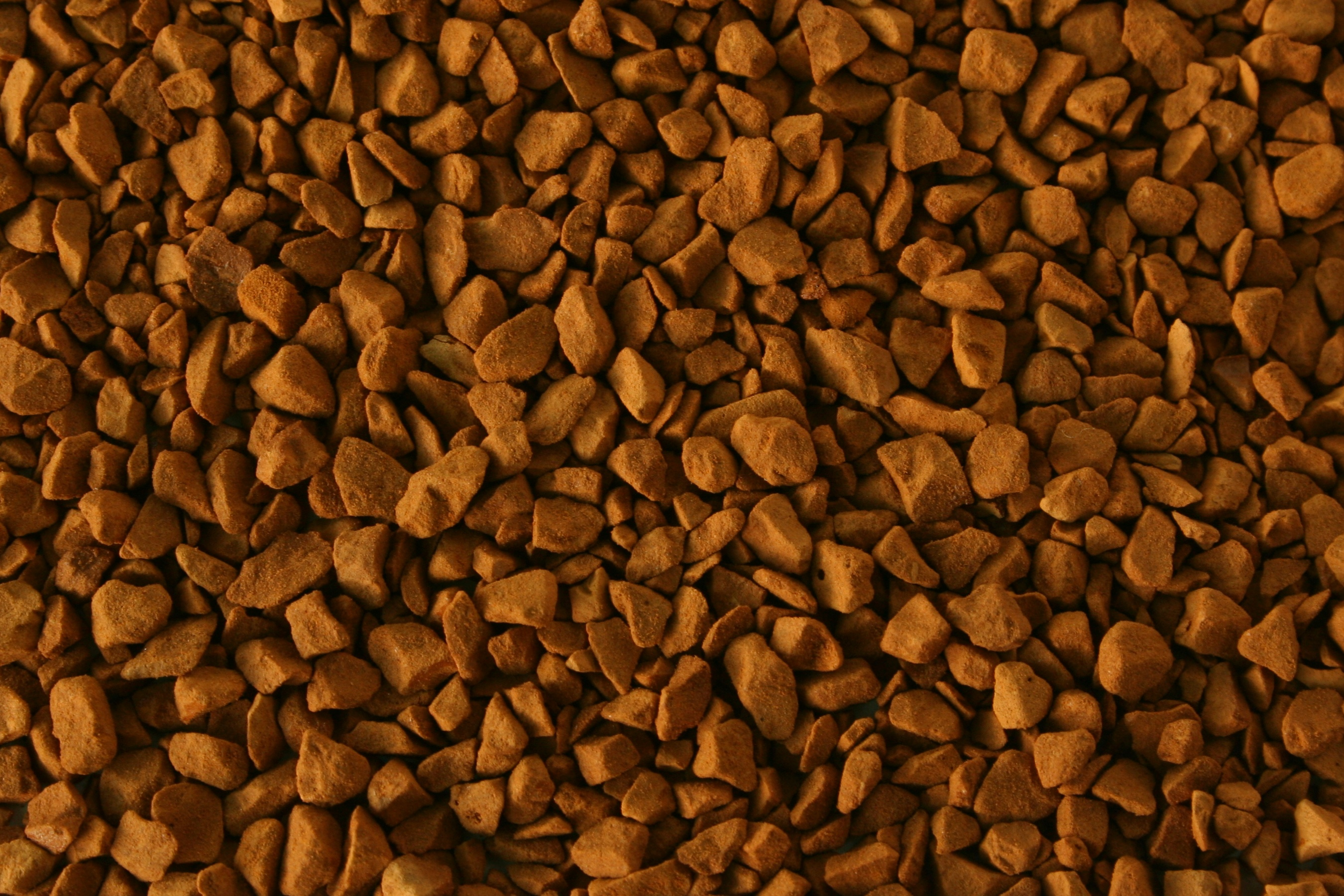
Freeze-dried coffee, a form of instant coffee

Coffee contains flavor and aroma qualities that are created due to the Maillard reaction during roasting. An instant coffee can be produced by freeze-drying a water extract of roasted beans. Compared to other drying methods like room temperature drying, hot-air drying, and solar drying, Robusta coffee beans that were freeze-dried contained higher amounts of essential amino acids like leucine, lysine, and phenylalanine. Also, a few non-essential amino acids that significantly contributed to taste were preserved.

==== Fruits ====
With conventional dehydration, berries can degrade in quality as their structure is delicate and contains high levels of moisture. Strawberries were found to have the highest quality when freeze dried; retaining color, flavor, and ability to be re-hydrated.

==== Mushrooms ====
Conventional heat-drying methods for mushrooms shrink and tighten the fungal tissue, yielding a leathery product that is slow to reconstitute. Freeze drying mushrooms causes solid ice crystals to form and then sublimate within the mycelial tissue, leaving behind microscopic pores that create a light, airy, sponge-like texture that absorbs water rapidly. Studies of freeze-dried mushroom powder show higher solubility and better dispersibility than powders from heat-dried mushrooms.

==== Insects ====
Freeze-drying is used extensively to preserve insects for the purposes of consumption. Whole freeze-dried insects are sold as exotic pet food, bird feed, fish bait, and increasingly for human consumption. Powdered freeze-dried insects are used as a protein base in animal feeds, and in some markets, as a nutritional supplement for human use. Farmed insects are generally used for all of the aforementioned purposes versus harvesting wild insects, except in the case of grasshoppers which are often harvested out of field crops.

=== Taxidermy ===
Freeze-drying is among the methods used to preserve animals in the field of taxidermy. When animals are preserved in this manner they are called "freeze-dried taxidermy" or "freeze-dried mounts". Freeze-drying is commonly used to preserve crustaceans, fish, amphibians, reptiles, insects, and smaller mammals. Freeze-drying is also used as a means to memorialize pets after death. Rather than opting for a traditional skin mount when choosing to preserve their pet via taxidermy, many owners opt for freeze-drying because it is less invasive upon the pet's body.

=== Other uses ===
Organizations such as the Document Conservation Laboratory at the United States National Archives and Records Administration (NARA) have done studies on freeze-drying as a recovery method of water-damaged books and documents. While recovery is possible, restoration quality depends on the material of the documents. If a document is made of a variety of materials, which have different absorption properties, expansion will occur at a non-uniform rate, which could lead to deformations. Water can also cause mold to grow or make inks bleed. In these cases, freeze-drying may not be an effective restoration method.

Advanced ceramics processes sometimes use freeze-drying to create a formable powder from a sprayed slurry mist. Freeze-drying creates softer particles with a more homogeneous chemical composition than traditional hot spray drying, but it is also more expensive.

== Advantages ==
Freeze-drying is viewed as the optimal method of choice for dehydration of food because of the preservation of quality, meaning characteristics of the food product such as aroma, rehydration, and bioactivity, are noticeably higher compared to foods dried using other techniques.

=== Shelf-life extension ===
Shelf-life extension results from low processing temperatures in conjunction with rapid transition of water through sublimation. With these processing conditions, deterioration reactions, including nonenzymic browning, enzymatic browning, and protein denaturation, are minimized. When the product is successfully dried, packaged properly, and placed in ideal storage conditions the foods have a shelf life of greater than 12 months.

=== Re-hydration ===
If a dried product cannot be easily or fully re-hydrated, it is considered to be of lower quality. If the final freeze dried product is porous, complete re-hydration can occur in the food. This signifies greater quality of the product and makes it ideal for ready-to-eat instant meals.

=== Effect on nutrients and sensory quality ===
Due to the low processing temperatures and the minimization of deterioration reactions, nutrients are retained and color is maintained. Freeze-dried fruit maintains its original shape and has a characteristic soft crispy texture.

== Disadvantages ==
=== Microbial growth ===
Since the main method of microbial decontamination for freeze drying is the low-temperature dehydration process, spoilage organisms and pathogens resistant to these conditions can remain in the product. Although microbial growth is inhibited by the low moisture conditions, it can still survive in the food product. An example of this is a viral hepatitis A outbreak that occurred in the United States in 2016, associated with frozen strawberries. If the product is not properly packaged and/or stored, the product can absorb moisture, allowing the once inhibited pathogens to begin reproducing as well.

=== Cost ===
Freeze-drying costs about five times as much as conventional drying, so it is most suitable for products which increase in value with processing. Costs are also variable depending on the product, the packaging material, processing capacity, etc. The most energy-intensive step is sublimation.

=== Silicone oil leakage ===
Silicone oil is the common fluid that is used to heat or cool shelves in the freeze-dryer. The continuous heat/cool cycle can lead to a leakage of silicone oil at weak areas that connect the shelf and hose. This can contaminate the product leading to major losses of pharmaceuticals and food products. Hence, to avoid this issue, mass spectrometers are used to identify vapors released by silicone oil to immediately take corrective action and prevent contamination of the product.

== Equipment and types of freeze dryers ==
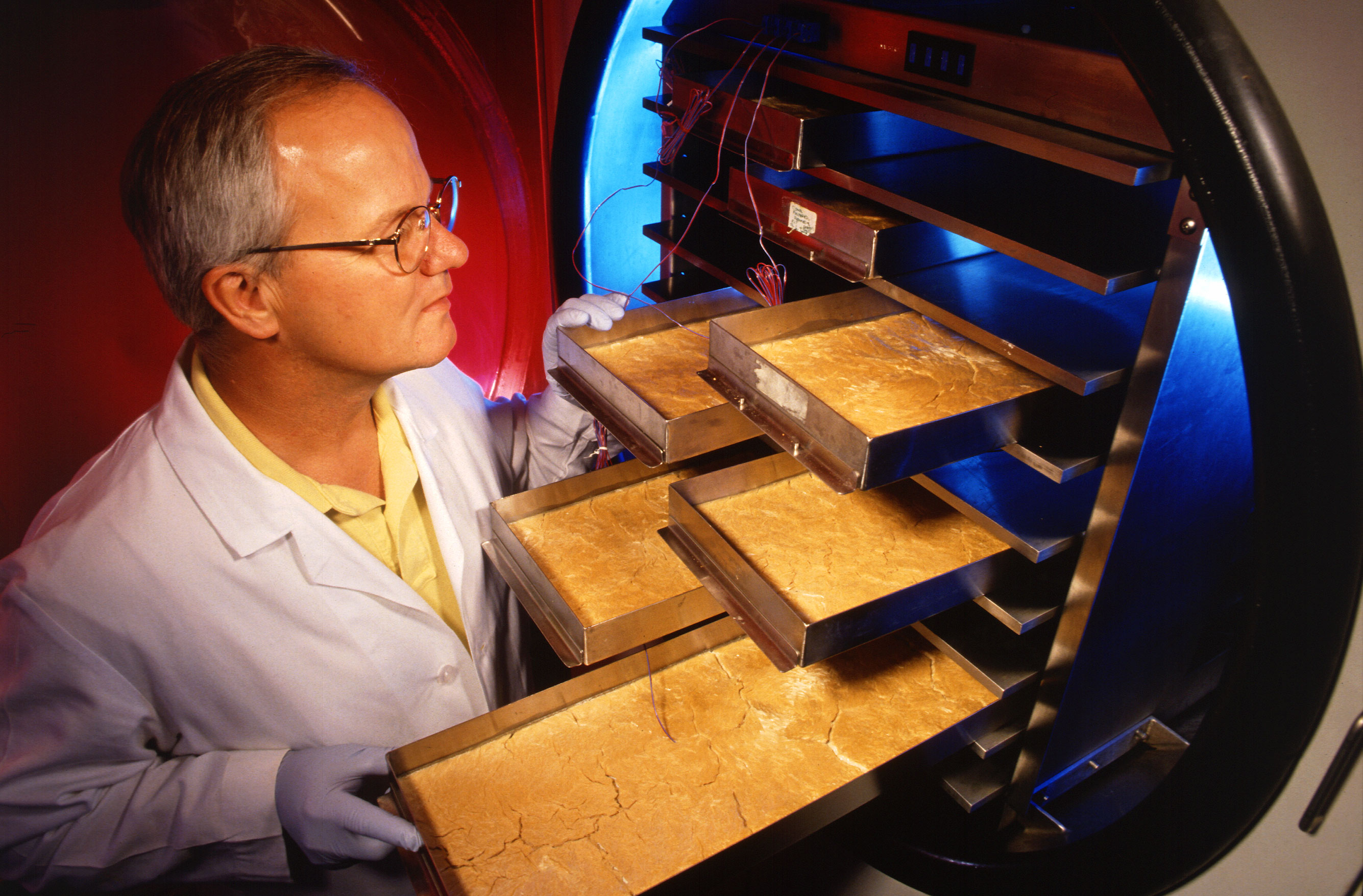
Unloading trays of freeze-dried material from a small cabinet-type freeze-dryer

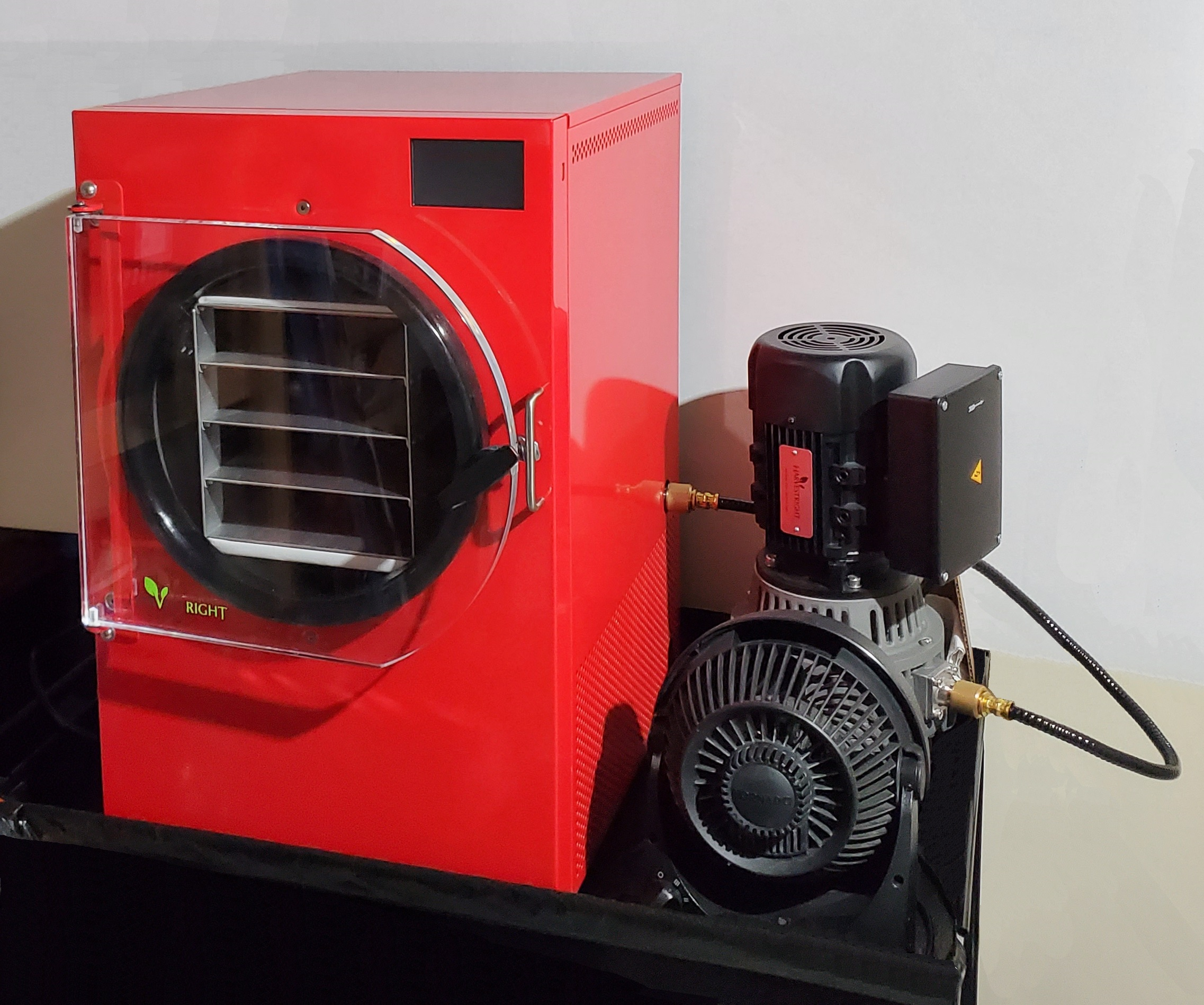
A residential freeze-dryer, along with the vacuum pump, and a cooling fan for the pump

There are many types of freeze-dryers available, however, they usually contain a few essential components. These are a vacuum chamber, shelves, process condenser, shelf-fluid system, refrigeration system, vacuum system, and control system.

=== Function of essential components ===
==== Chamber ====
The chamber is highly polished and contains insulation, internally. It is manufactured with stainless steel and contains multiple shelves for holding the product. A hydraulic or electric motor is in place to ensure the door is vacuum-tight when closed.

==== Process condenser ====
The process condenser consists of refrigerated coils or plates that can be external or internal to the chamber. During the drying process, the condenser traps water. For increased efficiency, the condenser temperature should be 20 °C (36 °F) less than the product during primary drying and have a defrosting mechanism to ensure that the maximum amount of water vapor in the air is condensed.

==== Shelf fluid ====
The amount of heat energy needed at times of the primary and secondary drying phase is regulated by an external heat exchanger. Usually, silicone oil is circulated around the system with a pump.

==== Refrigeration system ====
This system works to cool shelves and the process condenser by using compressors or liquid nitrogen, which will supply energy necessary for the product to freeze.

==== Vacuum system ====
During the drying process, a vacuum of 50–100 microbar is applied, by the vacuum system, to remove the solvent. A two-stage rotary vacuum pump is used, however, if the chamber is large then multiple pumps are needed. This system compresses non-condensable gases through the condenser.

==== Control system ====
Finally, the control system sets up controlled values for shelf temperature, pressure, and time that are dependent on the product and/or the process. The freeze-dryer can run for a few hours or days depending on the product.

=== Contact freeze dryers ===
Contact freeze dryers use contact (conduction) of the food with the heating element to supply the sublimation energy. This type of freeze dryer is a basic model that is simple to set up for sample analysis. One of the major ways contact freeze dryers heat is with shelf-like platforms contacting the samples. The shelves play a major role as they behave like heat exchangers at different times of the freeze-drying process. They are connected to a silicone oil system that will remove heat energy during freezing and provide energy during drying times.

Additionally, the shelf-fluid system works to provide specific temperatures to the shelves during drying by pumping a fluid (usually silicone oil) at low pressure. The downside to this type of freeze dryer is that the heat is only transferred from the heating element to the side of the sample immediately touching the heater. This problem can be minimized by maximizing the surface area of the sample touching the heating element by using a ribbed tray, slightly compressing the sample between two solid heated plates above and below, or compressing with a heated mesh from above and below.

=== Radiant freeze dryers ===
Radiant freeze dryers use infrared radiation to heat the sample in the tray. This type of heating allows for simple flat trays to be used as an infrared source can be located above the flat trays to radiate downward onto the product. Infrared radiation heating allows for a uniform heating of the surface of the product, but has little capacity for penetration so it is used mostly with shallow trays and homogeneous sample matrices.

=== Microwave-assisted freeze dryers ===
Microwave-assisted freeze dryers utilize microwaves to allow for deeper penetration into the sample to expedite the sublimation and heating processes in freeze-drying. This method can be complicated to set up and run as the microwaves can create an electrical field capable of causing gases in the sample chamber to become plasma. This plasma could potentially burn the sample, so maintaining a microwave strength appropriate for the vacuum levels and detecting plasma formation is imperative. The rate of sublimation in a product can affect the microwave impedance, in which power of the microwave must be changed accordingly.

== See also ==
- Cryofixation
- Drying
- Food drying
- Frozen mummies
- Freeze-dried food and NASA
- List of dried foods
- Supercritical drying
