= DMU (disambiguation) =

A diesel multiple unit is a diesel-powered, multiple-unit rail vehicle.

DMU may also refer to:

== Universities ==
- Dalian Maritime University, a university located in Dalian, Liaoning, China
- De Montfort University, located in the city of Leicester, England
- Des Moines University, a medical school located in Des Moines, Iowa
- Divine Mercy University, a university located in Arlington, Virginia
- Dongyang Mirae University, a university located in Guro District, Seoul, Gocheok-dong

== Other ==
- Dimapur Airport, (IATA:DMU), an airport in India
- Decision making unit, in business-to-business sales and marketing (B2B & B2C)
- Digital mockup, a product visualization method and technology used by engineers
- 1,1-Dimethylurea, a chemical substance
- 1,3-Dimethylurea, a chemical substance
- Drag make-up maneuver, a spacecraft orbital maneuver designed to counteract the effects of atmospheric drag
- Danmarks Miljøundersøgelser, Danish for National Environmental Research Institute of Denmark
