= Dimethylurea =

Dimethylurea could be:

- 1,1-Dimethylurea
- 1,3-Dimethylurea
