= Chloroxuron =

Names
- Preferred IUPAC name N′-[4-(4-Chlorophenoxy)phenyl]-N,N-dimethylurea
- Other names 3-[4-(4-Chlorophenoxy)phenyl]-1,1-dimethylurea

Identifiers
CAS Number	1982-47-4
3D model (JSmol)	Interactive image
ChEBI	CHEBI:82200
ChemSpider	15299
ECHA InfoCard	100.016.222
EC Number	217-843-7
KEGG	C19075
PubChem CID	16115
UNII	QER23C88ME
UN number	3077, 2767
CompTox Dashboard (EPA)	DTXSID7040287
- InChI: InChI=1/C15H15ClN2O2/c1-18(2)15(19)17-12-5-9-14(10-6-12)20-13-7-3-11(16)4-8-13/h3-10H,1-2H3,(H,17,19) Key: IVUXTESCPZUGJC-UHFFFAOYAN
- SMILES: Clc2ccc(Oc1ccc(NC(=O)N(C)C)cc1)cc2

Properties
Chemical formula	C_{15}H_{15}ClN_{2}O_{2}
Molar mass	290.75 g·mol^{−1}
Appearance	Solid
Density	1.27 g/cm^{3}
Melting point	151 °C (304 °F; 424 K)
Solubility in water	4 mg/L (water)
log P	3.2

Hazards
- GHS labelling
Pictograms	(GHS07: Exclamation mark) (GHS09: Environmental hazard)
Signal word	Warning
Hazard statements	H332, H400
Precautionary statements	P261, P271, P273, P304+P312, P304+P340, P312, P391, P501
Flash point	231.6 °C (448.9 °F; 504.8 K)
- Except where otherwise noted, data are given for materials in their standard state (at 25 °C [77 °F], 100 kPa). Infobox references

Chloroxuron is a phenylurea herbicide that appears as an odorless and colorless powder or white crystals. Phenylurea pesticides are characterized for their agricultural use to control weed growth, acting as photosynthesis inhibitors. These herbicides can either be endocrine disruptors, or have ecotoxic or genotoxic effects.

Chloroxuron's herbicide resistance class is Group C, (Australia), C2 (global), Group 7, (numeric); it is a urea and photosynthesis inhibitor.

Chloroxuron was initially produced by Ciba-Geigy in the 1960s as a herbicide. Chloroxuron can be found as a colorless powder or as a white crystal. Chloroxuron in particular is used for the control of annual grasses, mosses and broad-leaved weeds, and is useful for common crop plants such as soy beans, onions, strawberries, and celery. The herbicidal effects of chloroxuron act by inhibiting photosynthesis. Inhibition of photosynthesis promptly blocks the plant’s ability to produce ATP and leads to death. Chloroxuron inhibits photosynthesis by blocking the electron transport chain in the photosystem II.

Chloroxuron is classified as an extremely hazardous substance in the United States as defined in Section 302 of the U.S. Emergency Planning and Community Right-to-Know Act (42 U.S.C. 11002), and is subject to strict reporting requirements by facilities which produce, store, or use it in significant quantities. The EU pesticides database states that the usage of this compound is not allowed in the European Union.

== Structure and reactivity ==
Chloroxuron is an achiral organic compound with the molecular formula C_{15}H_{15}ClN_{2}O_{2}. Its structure consists of a chlorophenyl and methoxyphenyl group attached to a urea moiety (-NH-CO-NH-). It is classified as a diphenyl ether (two benzene rings connected by an oxygen atom), phenylurea derivative (N, N-dimethylurea in which a hydrogen atom on the amino group is replaced by a 4-(4-chlorophenoxy)phenyl group), and a monochlorobenzene compound. Chloroxuron is typically stable but incompatible with strong oxidizing agents and sensitive to light. Its degradation by soil microflora occurs at a very slow rate, resulting in a relatively long soil half-life.

== Synthesis ==
Chloroxuron can be synthesized through a nucleophilic addition reaction between 4-(4-chlorophenoxy)phenyl isocyanate and dimethylamine hydrochloride. The reaction proceeds via amine nucleophilic attack on the isocyanate, resulting in the formation of a substituted urea.

Another way to synthesize chloroxuron is through a two-step reaction. It proceeds via two nucleophilic addition-elimination mechanisms. In the first step, the lone pair of nitrogen from the amino group (-NH_{2}) of 4-amino-4'-chlorodiphenyl ether attacks the carbonyl carbon of N,N-dimethylurea, forming a tetrahedral intermediate, from which methylamine (CH_{3}NH_{2}) is eliminated as the leaving group. In the second step, dimethylamine attacks the carbonyl carbon of the intermediate, forming another tetrahedral intermediate. The methylamine is then eliminated from this intermediate, leading to the formation of chloroxuron.

An alternative three-step synthesis of chloroxuron begins with a nucleophilic aromatic substitution reaction between p-chlorophenol and p-chloroaniline under basic conditions, yielding 4-(4-chlorophenoxy)aniline. This intermediate is then treated with phosgene to form an isocyanate, which subsequently reacts with dimethylamine to produce the final substituted urea product.

== Reactions ==
Chloroxuron can be decomposed in several ways including hydrolysis, photo- and metabolic degradation. It breaks down into amines, urea derivatives, and phenols under strong acidic or basic conditions.

Under UV light, chloroxuron can undergo photochemical demethylation, dearylation, and dechlorination, as well as photooxidation, leading to the formation of hydroxylated compounds or chlorophenol derivatives. Degradation of chloroxuron in plants and soil is facilitated by microflora and microfauna, giving monomethylated, dimethylated, and aniline derivatives. One possible bio-enzymatic degradation pathway involves laccase immobilized on zein-polyurethane nanofibers.

== Use and purpose ==
Chloroxuron is a phenylurea herbicide mainly used for selective pre- and post-emergence control of annual mosses, grasses and broad-leaved weeds. This herbicide is particularly useful for common crop plants such as soy beans, onions, celery and strawberry.

The use of chloroxuron has declined after the European Union officially banned the substance in 2015, according to the amended Annexes II, III and V to Regulation (EC) No 396/2005.

“Corrigendum to Commission Regulation (EU) 2015/868 of 26 May 2015 amending Annexes II, III and V to Regulation (EC) No 396/2005 of the European Parliament and of the Council as regards maximum residue levels for 2,4,5-T, barban, binapacryl, bromophos-ethyl, camphechlor (toxaphene), chlorbufam, chloroxuron, chlozolinate, DNOC, di-allate, dinoseb, dinoterb, dioxathion, ethylene oxide, fentin acetate, fentin hydroxide, flucycloxuron, flucythrinate, formothion, mecarbam, methacrifos, monolinuron, phenothrin, propham, pyrazophos, quinalphos, resmethrin, tecnazene and vinclozolin in or on certain products” Official text from the European Union banning the use of chloroxuron.

== Mechanism of action ==
Chloroxuron interferes with photosynthesis by inhibiting the electron transport at the photosystem II receptor. This inhibition disrupts plant growth. Their herbicidal activity depends on inhibition of photosynthesis by blocking of electron transport in Photosystem II. As it can efficiently block photosynthesis, it is used as a common herbicide.

== Metabolism ==
Information related to Chloroxuron metabolism is highly limited, but it is hypothesized that through the chemical similarities between Chloroxuron and Chlorotoluron, their metabolisms would be similar too. Chloroxuron is enzymatically degraded by plants to the monomethylated & demethylated derivatives, followed by decarboxylation of the phenoxyphenyl urea to form (4-chlorophenoxy)aniline. The aniline derivative may be formed by direct hydrolysis of Chloroxuron. There is no evidence that conjugation of Chloroxuron degradation products occurs.

== Efficacy ==
Information about the efficacy of Chloroxuron is highly limited, but the study from Smeda et al. illustrates the herbicidal efficacy of Chloroxuron for broadleaf weeds and strawberry plants quite effectively. They reported that tank-mixing Chloroxuron did not significantly enhance broadleaf and grass weed control. The herbicidal activity of Chloroxuron towards strawberries was less than 10% in 1983. Fruit yield of strawberry plants did not reduce significantly due to Chloroxuron exposure.

== Side effects ==
=== Acute Health Effects ===
Shortly after exposure to Chloroxuron the following acute (short-term) effects may occur: Irritation to skin and eyes after contact, headache, fatigue, dizziness and methemoglobinemia (blue color to skin and lips) caused by inability of the blood to carry Oxygen after a high-level exposure.

Muscular weakness, aching, tremors, mental confusion, and central nervous system depression may also be noted. Contact with Chloroxuron dust may produce irritation of the eye and mucous membranes of the respiratory system.

=== Long-Term Effects ===
Certain health effects can be present for months or years after exposure to Chloroxuron. It has been found that this compound may affect the liver and nervous system.

Chloroxuron hasn’t been tested for cancer or reproductive effects, so it is not known if it could cause them.

== First aid measures after exposure ==
After exposure to chloroxuron, it is important to seek medical assistance. The steps to take medically depend on the type of exposure. In case of inhalation, move to fresh air, and if breathing is interrupted give artificial respiration. For eye contact, rinse the area thoroughly with plenty of water for a minimum of 15 minutes, lifting the lower and upper eyelids. If there is skin contact, wash the affected area with soap and water. If there is an irritation or allergic reaction, see a doctor. In case of ingestion, do not induce vomiting, rinse the mouth.

When treating a person that has been exposed to chloroxuron, it is important that the first-aider takes precautions to protect themselves and prevent spread of contamination by wearing personal protective equipment. Avoiding breathing any fumes from the substance.

== Toxicity ==
Symptoms of intoxication include depression, peripheral vasoconstriction, locomotion, hyperpnea, gasping, coma, death. For humans the following symptoms of intoxication have been listed: depression, peripheral vasoconstriction, locomotion, hyperpnea, gasping, coma, death.

Non-human toxicity values: LD_{50} Rat Oral: 3000mg/kg/technical, LD_{50} rat inhalation: >1.35 mg/l air/ 6hr, LD_{50} rat oral: 3700 mg/kg, male, LD_{50} rabbit dermal >10.000 mg/kg.

== Environmental toxicity ==
Chloroxuron is a substance moderately persistent in soil systems, but unlikely to persist in aquatic systems. However, it has a 50/53 risk code, which means that it is very toxic to aquatic organisms, and may cause long-term effects to aquatic environments.

== Effects on animals ==
Urea-derived herbicides, such as chloroxuron, have low acute toxicity in animals and are unlikely to present any hazard in normal use. These compounds may induce hepatic microsomal herbicides and can alter the metabolism of other xenobiotic agents. In laboratory animals, altered bone morphology and calcium metabolism have been found, however, cattle are more sensitive to urea herbicides compared to sheep, cats and dogs.

Chloroxuron has been reported to have low toxicity in animal feeding studies, as it is an urea-derived herbicide. However, it is slightly toxic to birds, but there was no toxicity found in bees.

There were also no harmful effects found by dermal application of 10000 mg/kg to rabbits for 21 days, but a slight irritation to rabbits’ eyes and skin were reported.
