= Allantoicase =

allantoicase
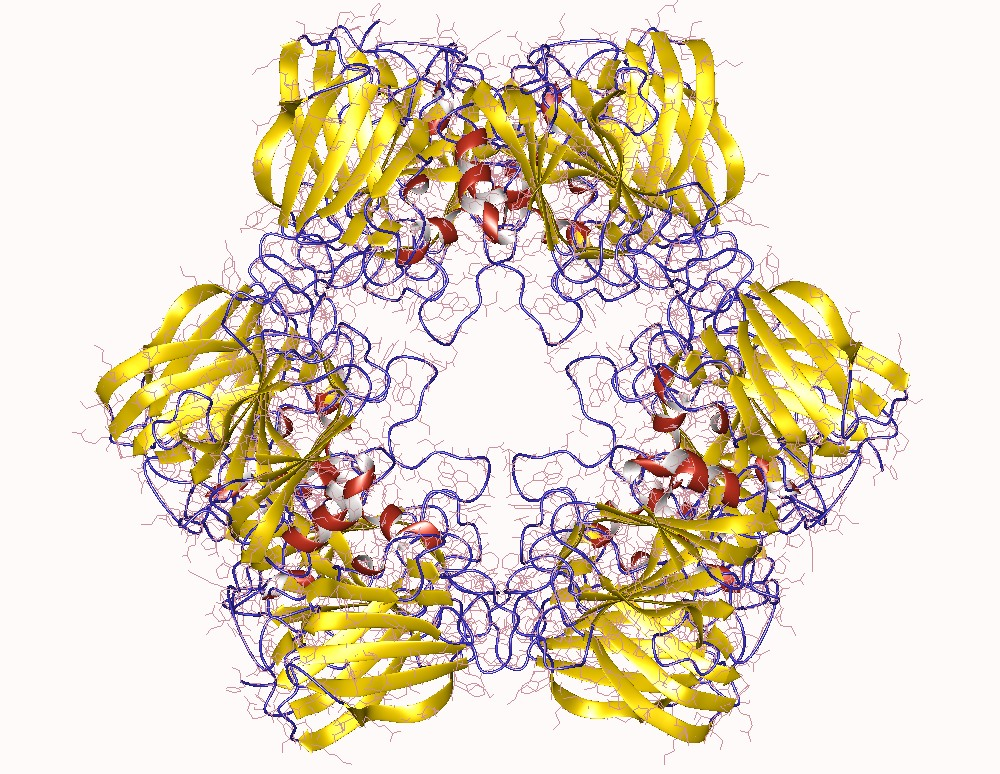
- Allantoicase homohexamer, Saccharomyces cerevisiae

Identifiers
- EC no.: 3.5.3.4
- CAS no.: 9025-21-2

Databases
- BRENDA: enzyme data
- ExPASy: NiceZyme view
- KEGG: enzyme entry
- MetaCyc: metabolic pathway
- Rhea: reactions
- PDB structures: RCSB PDB PDBe PDBsum
- Gene Ontology: AmiGO / QuickGO
Search
- PMC: articles
- PubMed: articles
- NCBI: proteins

Allantoicase
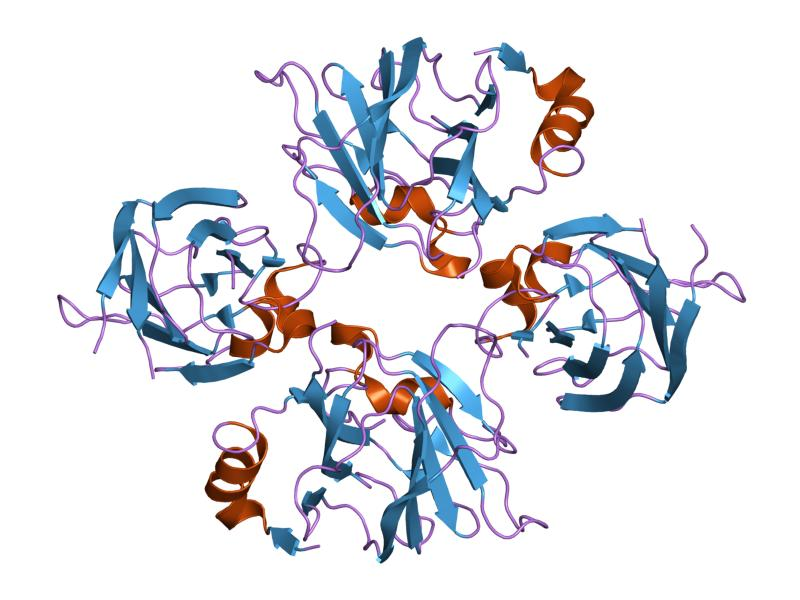
- structure of allantoicase

Identifiers
- Symbol: Allantoicase
- Pfam: PF03561
- Pfam clan: CL0202
- InterPro: IPR015908
- SCOP2: 1sg3 / SCOPe / SUPFAM
Available protein structures:
- PDB: IPR015908 PF03561 (ECOD; PDBsum)
- AlphaFold: IPR015908; PF03561

Allantoicase is an enzyme (EC 3.5.3.4) that in humans is encoded by the ALLC gene. It catalyzes the hydrolysis of allantoic acid to the (-) enantiomer of ureidoglycolic acid and urea:

allantoic acid
H_{2}O
(-)-ureidoglycolic acid
+
urea

This enzyme is a hydrolase, one acting on carbon-nitrogen bonds other than peptide bonds, specifically in linear amidines. The systematic name of this enzyme class is allantoate amidinohydrolase. It participates in purine metabolism by facilitating the utilization of purines as secondary nitrogen sources under nitrogen-limiting conditions. While purine degradation converges to uric acid in all vertebrates, its further degradation varies from species to species. Uric acid is excreted by birds, reptiles, and some mammals that do not have a functional uricase gene, whereas other mammals produce allantoin. Amphibians and microorganisms produce ammonia and carbon dioxide using the uricolytic pathway. Allantoicase performs the second step in this pathway catalyzing the conversion of allantoate into ureidoglycolate and urea.

== Structural studies ==
As of late 2007, two structures have been solved for this class of enzymes, with PDB accession codes PDB: 1O59 and PDB: 1SG3.

The structure of allantoicase is best described as being composed of two repeats (the allantoicase repeats: AR1 and AR2), which are connected by a flexible linker. The crystal structure, resolved at 2.4A resolution, reveals that AR1 has a very similar fold to AR2, both repeats being jelly-roll motifs, composed of four-stranded and five-stranded antiparallel beta-sheets. Each jelly-roll motif has two conserved surface patches that probably constitute the active site.
