= Allantoate deiminase =

Class of enzymes

Identifiers
- EC no.: 3.5.3.9
- CAS no.: 37289-13-7

Databases
- BRENDA: enzyme data
- ExPASy: NiceZyme view
- KEGG: enzyme entry
- MetaCyc: metabolic pathway
- Rhea: reactions
- PDB structures: RCSB PDB PDBe PDBsum
- Gene Ontology: AmiGO / QuickGO
Search
- PMC: articles
- PubMed: articles
- NCBI: proteins

Allantoate deiminase (EC 3.5.3.9) is an enzyme characterised from bacteria that catalyzes the hydrolysis of allantoic acid to (S)-2-ureidoglycine, with ammonia and carbon dioxide as byproducts:

allantoic acid
H_{2}O
NH_{3}
(S)-2-ureidoglycine
+ CO_{2}

The reaction is part of the catabolism of purine nucleotides, which allows organisms to recycle nitrogen. It is present in plants, bacteria, and fungi.

This enzyme is a hydrolase, one acting on carbon-nitrogen bonds other than peptide bonds, specifically in linear amidines. The systematic name of this enzyme class is allantoate amidinohydrolase (decarboxylating). This enzyme is also called allantoate amidohydrolase.
