= Noxytiolin =

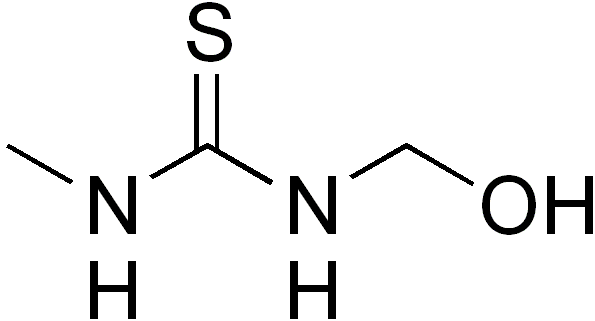
- Skeletal formula of noxytiolin

Names
- Preferred IUPAC name N-(Hydroxymethyl)-N′-methylthiourea

Identifiers
CAS Number	15599-39-0
3D model (JSmol)	Interactive image
ChemSpider	4418329
ECHA InfoCard	100.036.056
KEGG	D07426
PubChem CID	5251503
UNII	4DN3AF1FU6
CompTox Dashboard (EPA)	DTXSID20166011
- InChI: InChI=1S/C3H8N2OS/c1-4-3(7)5-2-6/h6H,2H2,1H3,(H2,4,5,7) Key: JLMHZVYLAQPMOZ-UHFFFAOYSA-N
- SMILES: CNC(=S)NCO

Properties
Chemical formula	C_{3}H_{8}N_{2}OS
Molar mass	120.17 g·mol^{−1}

Pharmacology
ATC code	B05CA07 (WHO)

Related compounds
Related compounds	1,3-Dimethylurea; 1,1,3,3-Tetramethylguanidine; Metformin; Allantoic acid; Carmustine
- Except where otherwise noted, data are given for materials in their standard state (at 25 °C [77 °F], 100 kPa). verify (what is ?) Infobox references

Noxytiolin is an anti-infective used for irrigation of the peritoneum.
