= Koya-dofu =

Type of tofu

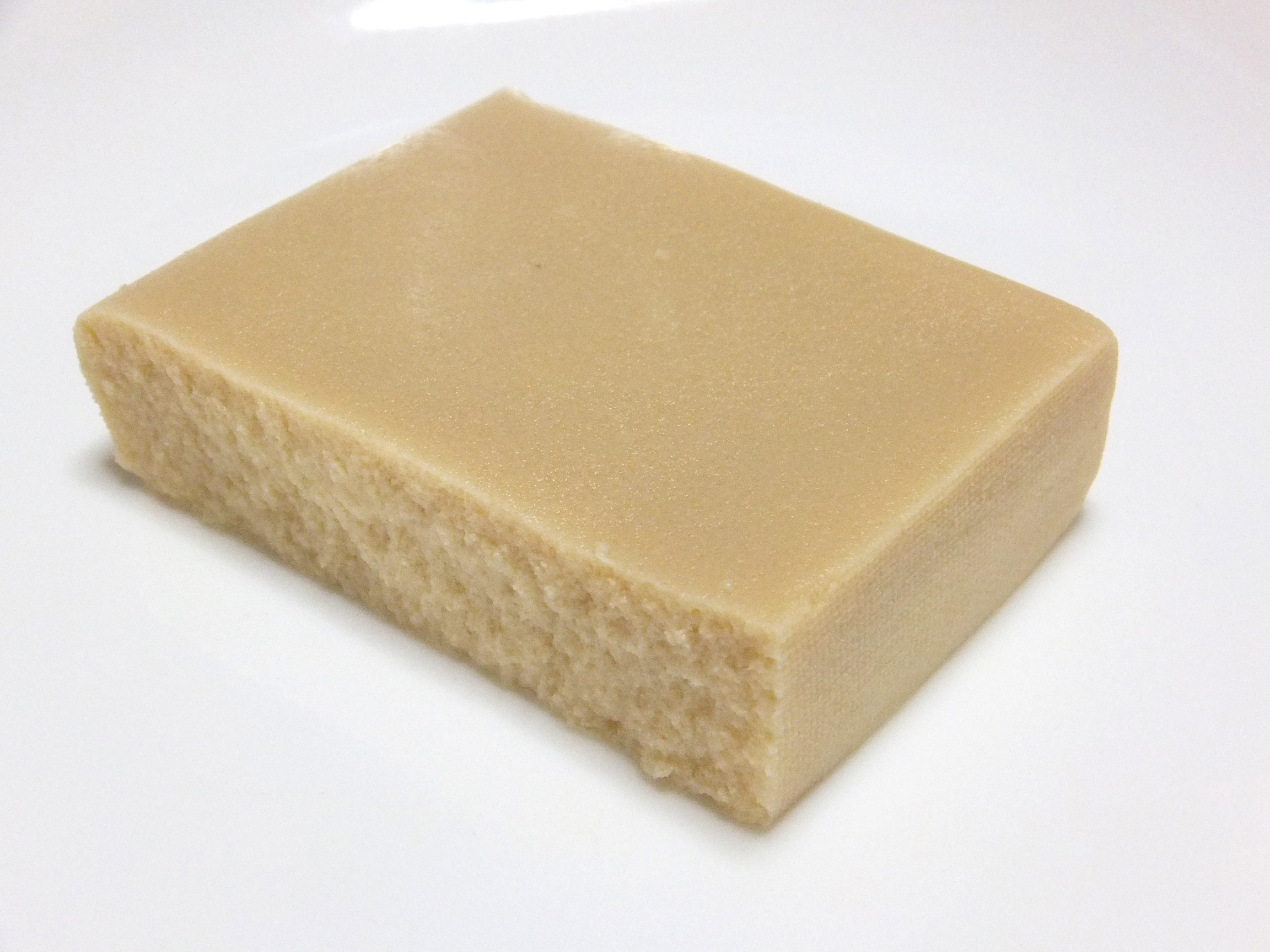
Koya-dofu

Koya-dofu (kōya-dōfu, 高野豆腐 in Japanese) also known as Shimi-dofu, Kori-dofu, or Koyasan-dofu is freeze-dried tofu, a Japanese pantry staple and an important ingredient in Buddhist vegetarian cookery. It originated from Japan. It is made of soy, coagulants, and baking soda. It looks like a hard sponge and needs to be soaked before use. It is mainly used in stews and soups.

== History ==
Freeze-dried tofu originated in Japan in the mid-1500s. The earliest mention of freeze-dried tofu in the West was not by Paillieux in 1880, as cited before, but in the catalogue of the Imperial Japanese Collection exhibited at Japan's first official participation at a World Exhibition, Vienna 1873.

=== Japan ===
In Japan, frozen-dried tofu was developed before frozen tofu. There are two traditional centers of origination of freeze-dried tofu in Japan, including Mount Koya and Nagano.

==== Mount Koya ====
It was developed by Mokujiki Shonin, a Shingon priest in the early 1600s during the Edo Period. He encouraged all the mountain temples to make their own tofu after he obtained large amounts of soybeans from the head Shingon temple. The purpose of this was to preserve some of the frozen tofu until the Spring equinox. Firm tofu was left outdoors in the cold windy night to freeze. After it was frozen, it was allowed to stand on shelves in a shed for fifteen days at temperatures below freezing, thawed in warm water and pressed lightly to expel the melted ice, then dried in the shed using heat from charcoal braziers.

==== Nagano ====
Nagano, located to the northeast of Tokyo, was the second center of origination. Freeze-dried tofu was first made during the mid-1500s. It was made by the famous feudal lord and warrior, Takeda Shingen, who developed a new drying process. The purpose was to make nutritious, but lightweight food for the soldiers. Firm tofu was frozen solid on boards outdoors in the snow. It was then wrapped in straw mats and placed in a cold barn for seven days, after which five pieces of tofu were tied together with bits of rice straw, which were then hung from poles, away from the sunlight. After thawing the frozen portions in the day then freezing at night multiple times, the tofu became a hard sponge.

=== West ===
In the West, one of the first known mentions of freeze-dried tofu was by Paillieux in 1880, "Sometimes during the winter tofu is frozen, then dried to give it a sponge-like texture. In this state, it lasts a long time and can be cooked in various ways."

Trimble mentioned the koya-dofu in the United States in 1896. It was mentioned as kori-tofu in 1899. In 1904, a mention appeared in the article "Ueber die Anwendung des Frostes bei der Herstellung einiger japanischer Nahrungsmittel" (The Use of Frost in the Production of Certain Japanese Food Products) by Oskar Loew.

In 1906, Senft, a member of the German Military Food Administration, mentioned koya-dofu as a preserved food used by the Japanese military during the Russo-Japanese War.

== Commercial production ==
=== Japan ===
As of 1980, 90% of the production of dried-frozen tofu in Japan was handled by a handful of companies in the Nagano area. Asahimatsu was the largest company as it accounted for over 55% of the country's dried-frozen tofu production. Misuzu-dofu, Nagai Sogo Shokuhin, Yamaguchi-ya, Taishi Shokuhin Kogyo, and Habutae-dofu were the other freeze-dried tofu producing companies.

== Production ==
The method of freeze-drying is used for production. The liquid of the bean curd turns into ice. Freezing changes the color, texture, size, and weight, after which it is thawed. At the end of the process, a beige and sponge-like tofu essence are achieved.

== Consumption ==
Koya dofu needs to be soaked in hot water for five minutes and then firmly pressed before use. It can be ground into tofu meal and flour, or made into tofu croutons.

== Nutrition and health ==
Koya-dofu is high in nutritional value. The way it is produced lets soy protein mature naturally, which helps in the development of new textures, preserving maximum nutritious value. Phytonutrients become more concentrated in it. Freeze-dried tofu serves as a source of protein, iron, and calcium. Consumption of this type of tofu lowers the risk of heart disease, diabetes, and obesity.
