= Allantoinase =

Class of enzymes

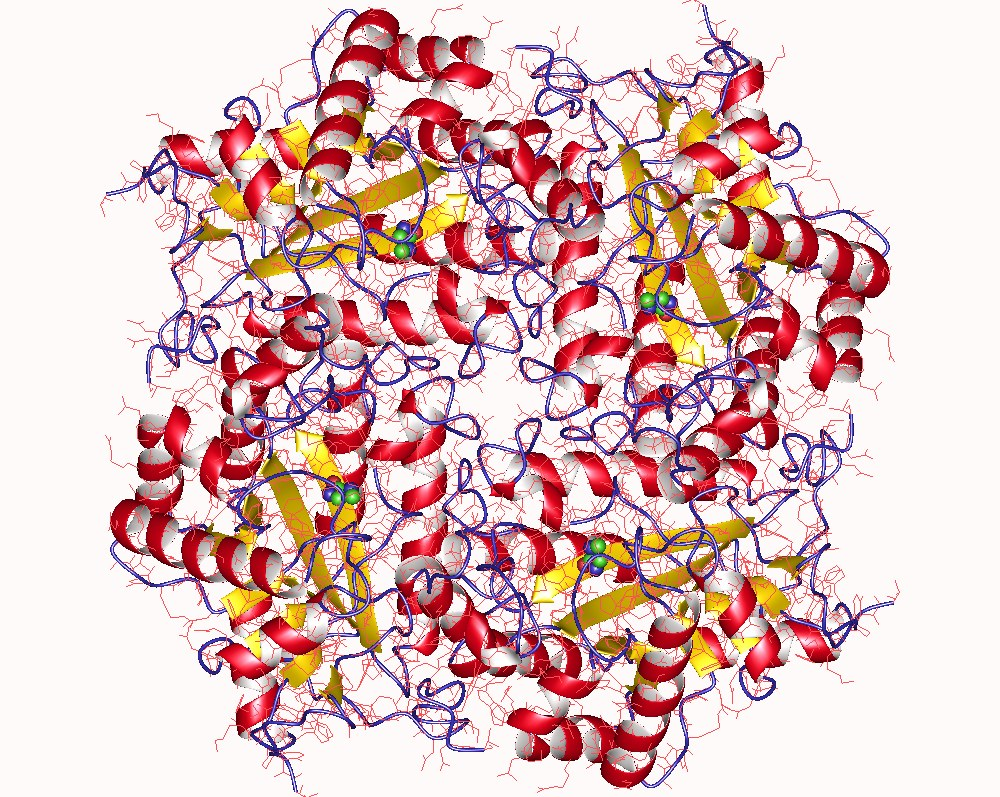
- Allantoinase (analog) tetramer, Pseudomonas fluorescens

Identifiers
- EC no.: 3.5.2.5
- CAS no.: 9025-20-1

Databases
- BRENDA: enzyme data
- ExPASy: NiceZyme view
- KEGG: enzyme entry
- MetaCyc: metabolic pathway
- Rhea: reactions
- PDB structures: RCSB PDB PDBe PDBsum
- Gene Ontology: AmiGO / QuickGO
Search
- PMC: articles
- PubMed: articles
- NCBI: proteins

Allantoinase (EC 3.5.2.5) is an enzyme characterised from Escherichia coli that catalyzes the hydrolysis of (S)-allantoin to allantoic acid:

(S)-allantoin
H_{2}O
H_{2}O
allantoic acid

Since allantoin is product of purine metabolism and a component in soil, it can be a source of nitrogen for plants that contain the enzyme. It can be used to measure oxidative stress.

This enzyme is a hydrolase, one acting on carbon-nitrogen bonds other than peptide bonds, specifically in cyclic amides. The systematic name of this enzyme class is (S)-allantoin amidohydrolase.
