= High value products =

Concept in US agricultural policy

In United States agricultural policy, high value products (HVP) refers to agricultural products that are high in value, often but not necessarily due to processing.

HVPs can be divided into three groups:

- semi-processed products, such as fresh and frozen meats, flour, vegetable oils, roasted coffee, refined sugar;
- highly processed products that are ready for the consumer, such as milk, cheese, wine, breakfast cereals;
- high-value unprocessed products that are also often consumer-ready, such as fresh and dried fruits and vegetables, eggs, and nuts.

In recent years HVPs have accounted for a greater percentage than bulk commodities in total value of U.S. agricultural exports.
