= Carmustine =

- Skeletal formula of carmustine

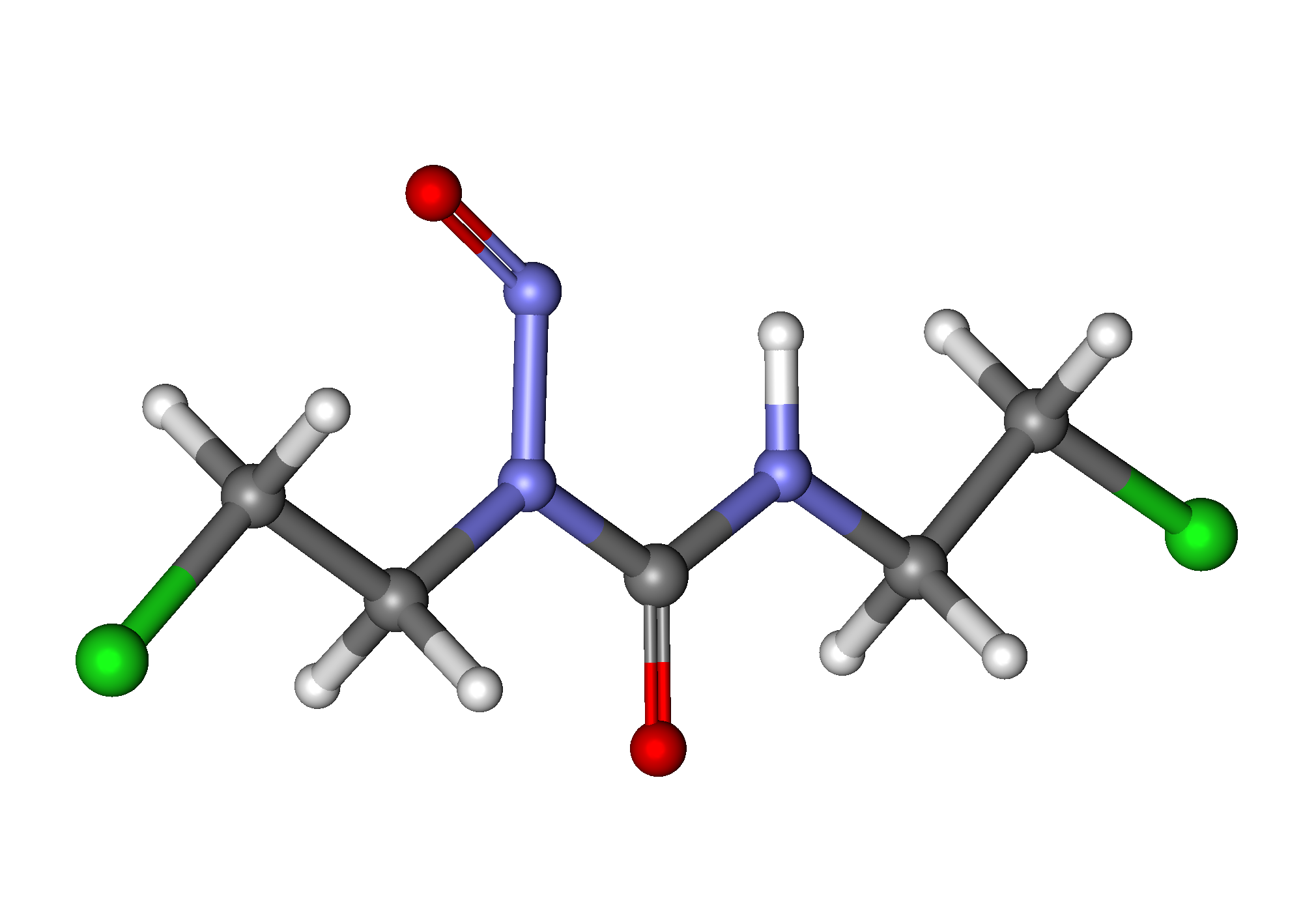
- Ball-and-stick model of carmustine molecule

Names
- IUPAC name 1,3-Bis(2-chloroethyl)-1-nitrosourea
- Other names N,N'-Bis(2-chloroethyl)-N-nitrosourea, bis-chloroethylnitrosourea, BCNU

Identifiers
| CAS Number | 154-93-8 |
| 3D model (JSmol) | Interactive image |
| ChEBI | CHEBI:3423 |
| ChEMBL | ChEMBL513 |
| ChemSpider | 2480 |
| DrugBank | DB00262 |
| ECHA InfoCard | 100.005.309 |
| EC Number | 205-838-2 |
| KEGG | D00254 |
| MeSH | Carmustine |
| PubChem CID | 2578 |
| RTECS number | YS2625000 |
| UNII | U68WG3173Y |
| UN number | 2811 |
| CompTox Dashboard (EPA) | DTXSID8022743 |
- InChI: InChI=1S/C5H9Cl2N3O2/c6-1-3-8-5(11)10(9-12)4-2-7/h1-4H2,(H,8,11) Key: DLGOEMSEDOSKAD-UHFFFAOYSA-N
- SMILES: C(CCl)NC(=O)N(CCCl)N=O

Properties
| Chemical formula | C_{5}H_{9}Cl_{2}N_{3}O_{2} |
| Molar mass | 214.05 g·mol^{−1} |
| Appearance | Orange crystals |
| Odor | Odourless |
| Melting point | 30 °C (86 °F; 303 K) |
| log P | 1.375 |
| Acidity (pK_{a}) | 10.194 |
| Basicity (pK_{b}) | 3.803 |

Pharmacology
| ATC code | L01AD01 (WHO) |
| Pregnancy category | AU: D |
| License data | EU EMA: by INN |
| Legal status | AU: S4 (Prescription only); UK: POM (Prescription only); US: ℞-only; EU: Rx-only |

Hazards
- GHS labelling
| Pictograms | (GHS06: Toxic) (GHS08: Health hazard) |
| Signal word | Danger |
| Hazard statements | H300, H350, H360 |
| Precautionary statements | P301+P310, P308+P313 |
- Lethal dose or concentration (LD, LC)
| LD_{50} (median dose) | 20 mg kg^{−1} (oral, rat) |

Related compounds
| Related ureas | 1,3-Dimethylurea |
| Related compounds | Noxytiolin; 1,1,3,3-Tetramethylguanidine; Metformin; Allantoic acid; Buformin |
- Except where otherwise noted, data are given for materials in their standard state (at 25 °C [77 °F], 100 kPa). verify (what is ?) Infobox references

Carmustine
Clinical data
- Trade names: BiCNU, Gliadel
- AHFS/Drugs.com: Monograph
- MedlinePlus: a682060
- License data: US DailyMed: Carmustine
- Drug class: Antineoplastic agents

Identifiers
- CompTox Dashboard (EPA): DTXSID8022743
- ECHA InfoCard: 100.005.309

Carmustine, sold under the brand name BiCNU among others, is a medication used mainly for chemotherapy. It is a nitrogen mustard β-chloro-nitrosourea compound used as an alkylating agent.

== Description ==
Carmustine is an orange-yellow solid medication used mainly for chemotherapy. It is a nitrogen mustard β-chloro-nitrosourea compound.

== Mechanism of action ==
As an alkylating agent, carmustine can form interstrand crosslinks in DNA, which prevents DNA replication and DNA transcription.

== Uses ==
Carmustine is used as an alkylating agent to treat several types of brain cancer including glioma, glioblastoma multiforme, medulloblastoma and astrocytoma, multiple myeloma, and lymphoma (Hodgkin's and non-Hodgkin).

Carmustine is sometimes used in conjunction with alkyl guanine transferase (AGT) inhibitors, such as O^{6}-benzylguanine. The AGT-inhibitors increase the efficacy of carmustine by inhibiting the direct reversal pathway of DNA repair, which will prevent formation of the interstrand crosslink between the N^{1} of guanine and the N^{3} of cytosine.

It is also used as part of a chemotherapeutic protocol in preparation for hematological stem cell transplantation, a type of bone marrow transplant, in order to reduce the white blood cell count in the recipient. Use under this protocol, usually with fludarabine and melphalan, was developed by oncologists at the University of Texas MD Anderson Cancer Center.

== Implants ==
In the treatment of brain tumours, the U.S. Food and Drug Administration (FDA) approved biodegradable discs infused with carmustine (Gliadel). They are implanted under the skull during a surgery called a craniotomy. The disc allows for controlled release of carmustine in the extracellular fluid of the brain, thus eliminating the need for the encapsulated drug to cross the blood-brain barrier.

== Production ==
Carmustine for injection was marketed under the name BiCNU by Bristol-Myers Squibb and now by Emcure Pharmaceuticals. In India it is sold under various brand names, including Consium.. The product is available as a generic version with other manufacturers offering the product licensed in the US and EU markets.

== See also ==
- Bendamustine
- Lomustine
- Semustine
