= 1,3-Dimethylurea =

- Skeletal formula of dimethylurea

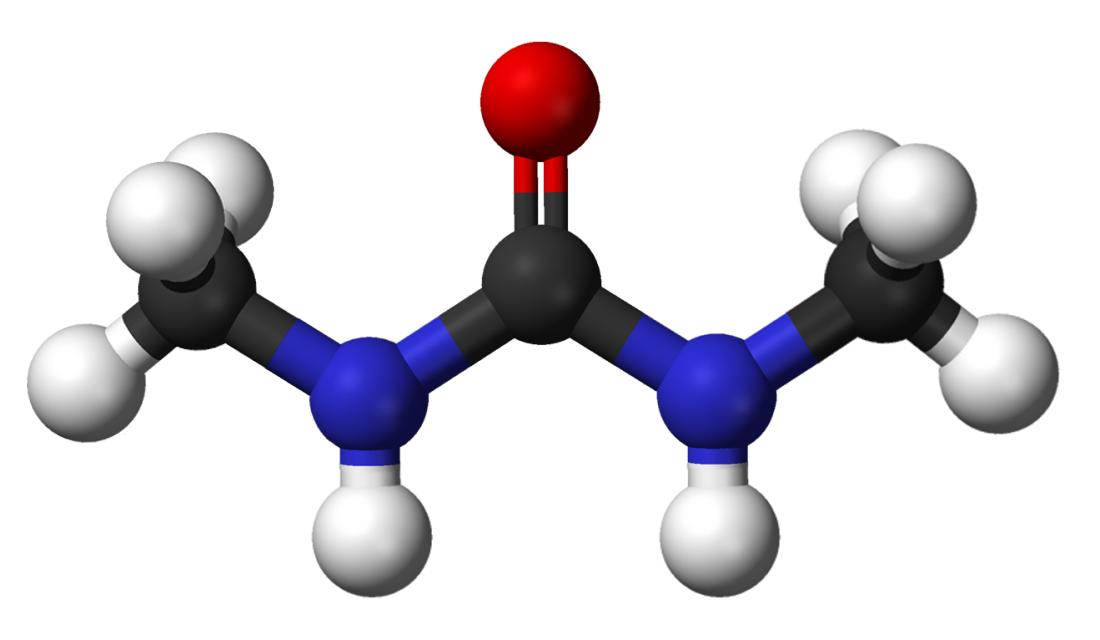
- Ball and stick model of dimethylurea

Names
- IUPAC name 1,3-Dimethylurea
- Preferred IUPAC name N,N′-Dimethylurea
- Other names sym-Dimethylurea

Identifiers
CAS Number	96-31-1
3D model (JSmol)	Interactive image
ChEBI	CHEBI:80472
ChEMBL	ChEMBL1234380
ChemSpider	7021
ECHA InfoCard	100.002.272
EC Number	202-498-7
KEGG	C16364
MeSH	1,3-dimethylurea
PubChem CID	7293
RTECS number	YS9868000
UNII	WAM6DR9I4X
CompTox Dashboard (EPA)	DTXSID5025156
- InChI: InChI=1S/C3H8N2O/c1-4-3(6)5-2/h1-2H3,(H2,4,5,6) Key: MGJKQDOBUOMPEZ-UHFFFAOYSA-N
- SMILES: CNC(=O)NC

Properties
Chemical formula	C_{3}H_{8}N_{2}O
Molar mass	88.110 g·mol^{−1}
Appearance	Colorless, waxy crystals
Odor	Odorless
Density	1.142 g mL^{−1}
Melting point	104.4 °C; 219.8 °F; 377.5 K
Boiling point	269.1 °C; 516.3 °F; 542.2 K
Solubility in water	765 g L^{−1}
Magnetic susceptibility (χ)	−55.1·10^{−6} cm^{3}/mol

Thermochemistry
Std enthalpy of formation (Δ_{f}H^{⦵}_{298})	−312.1 to −312.1 kJ mol^{−1}
Std enthalpy of combustion (Δ_{c}H^{⦵}_{298})	−2.0145 to −2.0089 MJ mol^{−1}

Hazards
- GHS labelling
Hazard statements	H373
Precautionary statements	P260, P314, P501
Flash point	157 °C (315 °F; 430 K)
- Lethal dose or concentration (LD, LC)
LD_{50} (median dose)	4 g kg^{−1} (oral, rat)

Related compounds
Related ureas	Carmustine
Related compounds	Noxytiolin; 1,1,3,3-Tetramethylguanidine; Metformin; Allantoic acid
- Except where otherwise noted, data are given for materials in their standard state (at 25 °C [77 °F], 100 kPa). verify (what is ?) Infobox references

1,3-Dimethylurea (DMU) is a urea derivative and used as an intermediate in organic synthesis. It is a colorless crystalline powder with little toxicity.

== Uses ==
1,3-Dimethylurea is used for synthesis of caffeine, theophylline, pharmaceuticals, textile aids, herbicides and others. In the textile processing industry, 1,3-dimethylurea is used as intermediate for the production of formaldehyde-free easy-care finishing agents for textiles. The estimated world production of DMU is estimated to be less than 25,000 tons.
