= 1,1,3,3-Tetramethylguanidine =

- Skeletal formula of 1,1,3,3-tetramethylguanidine

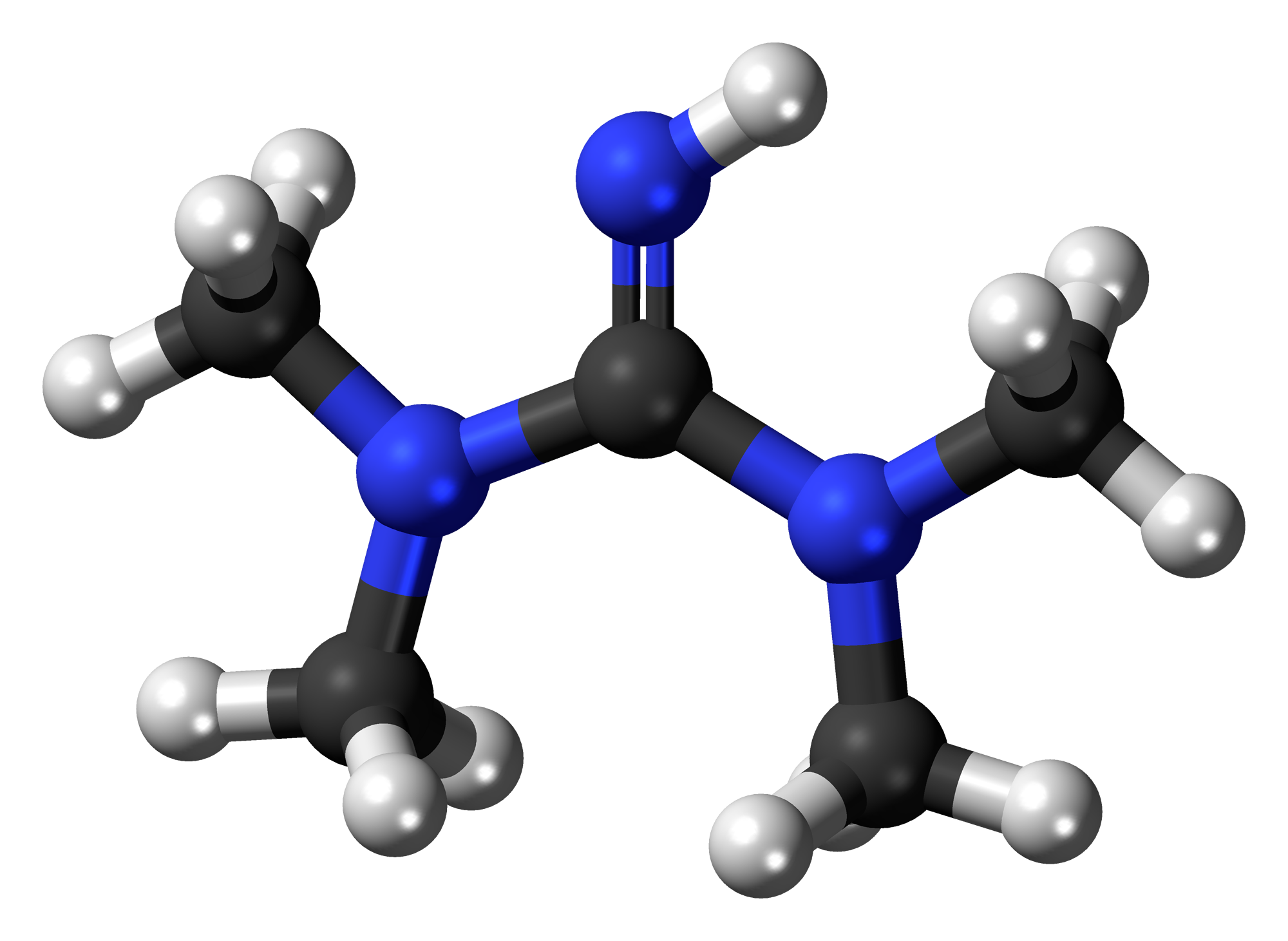
- Ball and stick model of 1,1,3,3-tetramethylguanidine

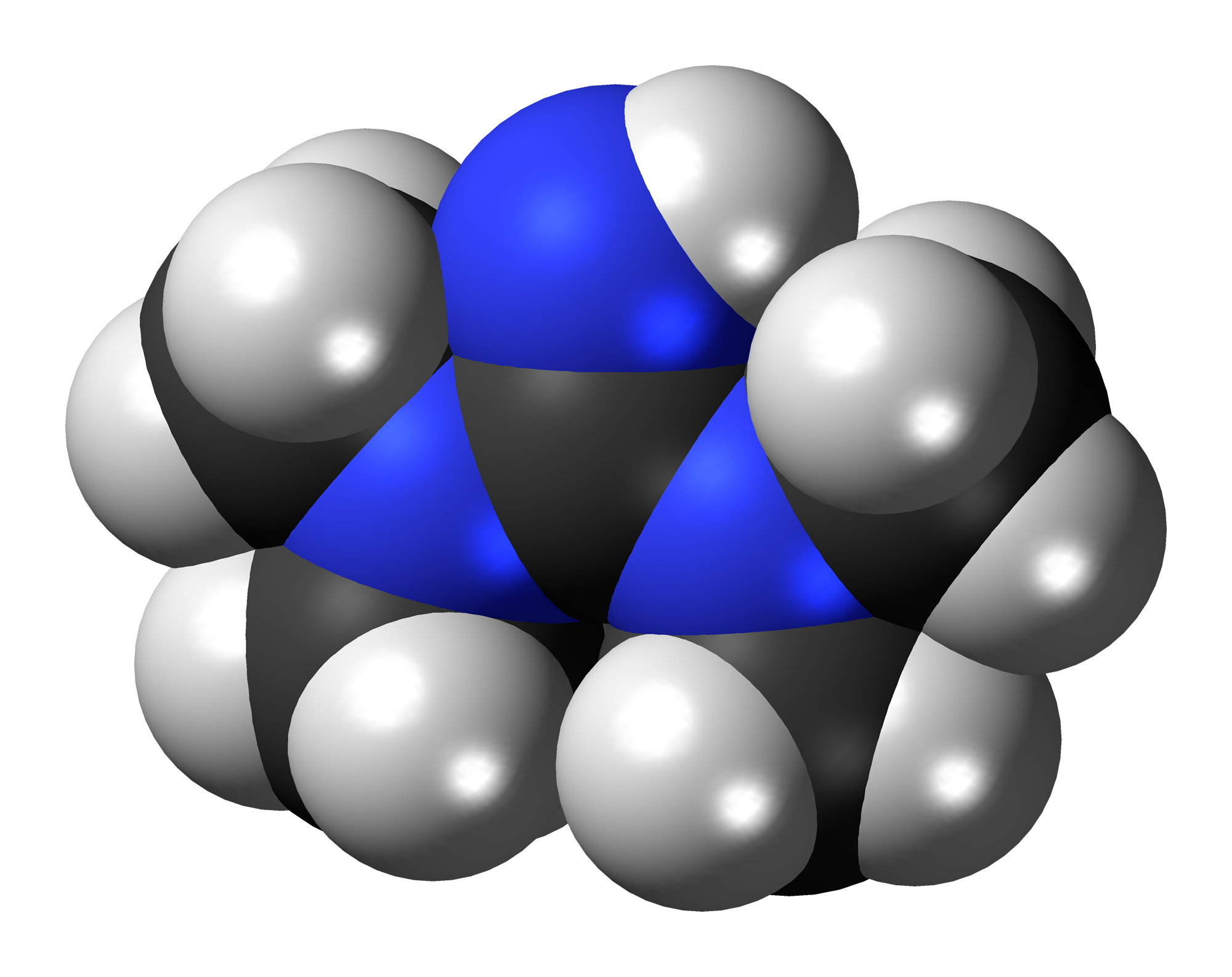
- Spacefill model of 1,1,3,3-tetramethylguanidine

Names
- Preferred IUPAC name N,N,N′,N′-Tetramethylguanidine

Identifiers
CAS Number	80-70-6
3D model (JSmol)	Interactive image
Beilstein Reference	969608
ChemSpider	59832
ECHA InfoCard	100.001.185
EC Number	201-302-7
MeSH	1,1,3,3-tetramethylguanidine
PubChem CID	66460
UNII	VEZ101E7ZU
UN number	2920
CompTox Dashboard (EPA)	DTXSID2058835
- InChI: InChI=1S/C5H13N3/c1-7(2)5(6)8(3)4/h6H,1-4H3 Key: KYVBNYUBXIEUFW-UHFFFAOYSA-N
- SMILES: CN(C)C(=N)N(C)C

Properties
Chemical formula	C_{5}H_{13}N_{3}
Molar mass	115.180 g·mol^{−1}
Appearance	Colourless liquid
Density	918 mg mL^{−1}
Melting point	−30 °C (−22 °F; 243 K)
Boiling point	160 to 162 °C (320 to 324 °F; 433 to 435 K)
Solubility in water	Miscible
Vapor pressure	30 Pa (at 20 °C)
Acidity (pK_{a})	13.0±1.0 (pK_{a} of conjugate acid in water)
Refractive index (n_{D})	1.469

Hazards
- GHS labelling
Pictograms	(GHS02: Flammable) (GHS05: Corrosive) (GHS07: Exclamation mark)
Signal word	Danger
Hazard statements	H226, H302, H314
Precautionary statements	P280, P305+P351+P338, P310
Flash point	60 °C (140 °F; 333 K)
Explosive limits	1–7.5%

Related compounds
Related compounds	Tetramethylurea; Noxytiolin; Metformin; Buformin; Allantoic acid; Carmustine
- Except where otherwise noted, data are given for materials in their standard state (at 25 °C [77 °F], 100 kPa). verify (what is ?) Infobox references

Tetramethylguanidine is an organic compound with the formula HNC(N(CH_{3})_{2})_{2}. This colourless liquid, while technically a "weak base," is a relatively strong base, as judged by the high pK_{a} of its conjugate acid.

It was originally prepared from tetramethylthiourea via S-methylation and amination, but alternative methods start from cyanogen iodide.

== Uses ==
Tetramethylguanidine is mainly used as a strong, non-nucleophilic base for alkylations, often as a substitute for the more expensive DBU and DBN. Since it is highly water-soluble, it is easily removed from mixtures in organic solvents. It is also used as a base-catalyst in the production of polyurethane.
