= 1,1-Dimethylurea =

Names
- Preferred IUPAC name N,N-Dimethylurea

Identifiers
CAS Number	598-94-7
3D model (JSmol)	Interactive image
ChemSpider	11244
ECHA InfoCard	100.009.053
PubChem CID	11737
UNII	I988R763P3
CompTox Dashboard (EPA)	DTXSID0060515
- InChI: InChI=1S/C3H8N2O/c1-5(2)3(4)6/h1-2H3,(H2,4,6) Key: YBBLOADPFWKNGS-UHFFFAOYSA-N
- SMILES: CN(C)C(=O)N

Properties
Chemical formula	C_{3}H_{8}N_{2}O
Molar mass	88.110 g·mol^{−1}

Hazards
- GHS labelling
Pictograms	(GHS07: Exclamation mark)
Signal word	Warning
Hazard statements	H315, H319, H335
Precautionary statements	P261, P264, P264+P265, P271, P280, P302+P352, P304+P340, P305+P351+P338, P319, P321, P332+P317, P337+P317, P362+P364, P403+P233, P405, P501

Related compounds
Related compounds	1,3-Dimethylurea
- Except where otherwise noted, data are given for materials in their standard state (at 25 °C [77 °F], 100 kPa). Infobox references

1,1-Dimethylurea (DMU) is a urea derivative used as a polar solvent and a reagent in organic reactions. It is a solid, but forms a eutectic with a low melting point in combination with various hydroxylic additives that can serve as a environmentally sustainable solvent for various chemical reactions. The unsubstituted nitrogen, as an amine-like region, can serve as a nucleophile for a wide range of reactions, including reaction with acyl halides to form acylureas, coupling with vinyl halides, and multi-component condensation reaction with aldehydes. The unsubstituted amide-like portion can undergo oxidative coupling with alkenes to give dihydrooxazoles.
