= Allantoic acid =

- Skeletal formula of allantoic acid

Names
- Preferred IUPAC name Bis(carbamoylamino)acetic acid
- Other names: 2,2-Di[(aminocarbonyl)amino]acetic acid; Diureidoacetate; 2,2-Diureidoacetic acid

Identifiers
CAS Number	99-16-1
3D model (JSmol)	Interactive image
Beilstein Reference	1790227
ChEBI	CHEBI:30837
ChemSpider	198
ECHA InfoCard	100.002.487
EC Number	202-735-4
Gmelin Reference	240954
KEGG	C00499
MeSH	allantoic+acid
PubChem CID	203
UNII	02WGT7SHWJ
CompTox Dashboard (EPA)	DTXSID3059187
- InChI: InChI=1S/C4H8N4O4/c5-3(11)7-1(2(9)10)8-4(6)12/h1H,(H,9,10)(H3,5,7,11)(H3,6,8,12) Key: NUCLJNSWZCHRKL-UHFFFAOYSA-N
- SMILES: NC(=O)NC(NC(N)=O)C(O)=O

Properties
Chemical formula	C_{4}H_{8}N_{4}O_{4}
Molar mass	176.132 g·mol^{−1}
Density	1.618 g mL^{−1}

Hazards
Flash point	219.4 °C (426.9 °F; 492.5 K)

Related compounds
Related compounds	Noxytiolin; 1,1,3,3-Tetramethylguanidine; Metformin; Carmustine
- Except where otherwise noted, data are given for materials in their standard state (at 25 °C [77 °F], 100 kPa). verify (what is ?) Infobox references

Allantoic acid is an organic compound with the chemical formula C_{4}H_{8}N_{4}O_{4}. It is a crystalline acid obtained by hydrolysis of allantoin.

In nature, allantoic acid is produced from allantoin by the enzyme allantoinase (encoded by the gene AllB (Uniprot: P77671) in Escherichia coli and other bacteria).
