= Coinage metal N-heterocyclic carbene complexes =

Coinage metal N-heterocyclic carbene (NHC) complexes refer to transition metal complexes incorporating at least one coinage metal center (M = Cu, Ag, Au) ligated by at least one NHC-type persistent carbene. A variety of such complexes have been synthesized through deprotonation of the appropriate imidazolium precursor and metalation by the appropriate metal source, producing M^{I}, M^{II}, or M^{III} NHC complexes. While the general form can be represented as (R_{2}N)_{2}C:–M (R = various alkyl or aryl groups), the exact nature of the bond between NHC and M has been investigated extensively through computational modeling and experimental probes. These results indicate that the M-NHC bond consists mostly of electrostatic attractive interactions, with some covalent bond character arising from NHC to M σ donation and minor M to NHC π back-donation. Coinage metal NHC complexes show effective activity as catalysts for various organic transformations functionalizing C-H and C-C bonds, and as antimicrobial and anticancer agents in medicinal chemistry.

== Synthesis and structures ==
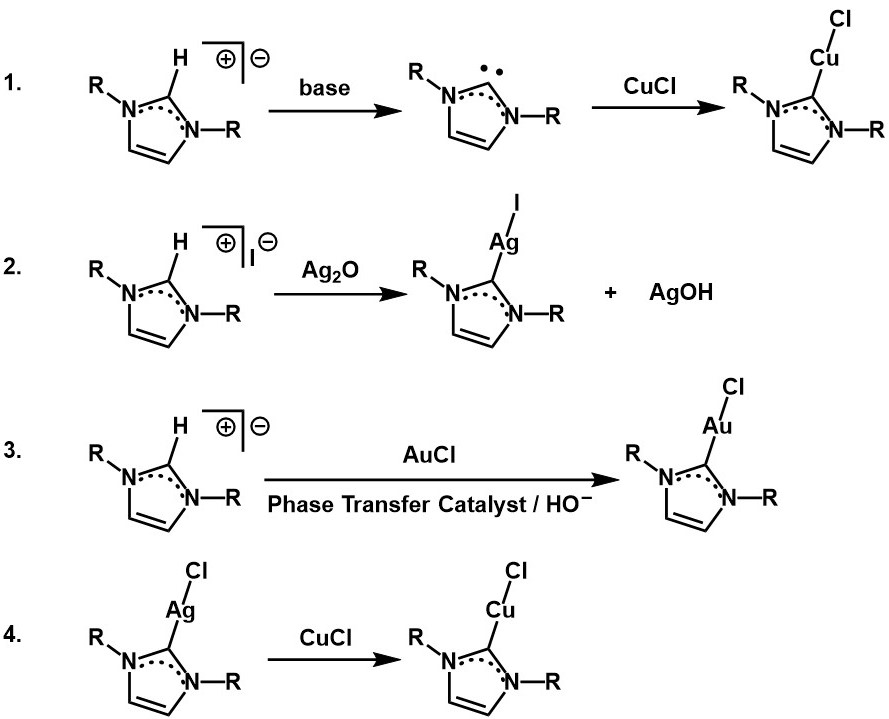
Schematic examples of coinage metal NHC complexes synthesized through the four typical methods highlighted in the text.

There are four typical methods to synthesize coinage metal NHC complexes:

1. Preparation of the free isolated carbene, followed by separate metalation with an M source.
2. In situ deprotonation and metalation of the imidazolium salt precursor with a basic M oxide.
3. Reaction of the imidazolium salt precursor with an M salt using basic phase transfer conditions.
4. Preparation of the Ag^{I} NHC complex through another method, followed by transmetalation to the corresponding Cu^{I} or Au^{I} complex.

These complexes can be neutral or cationic, with variety in M nuclearity, NHC ligand multiplicity and denticity, and supporting ligands.

=== Copper NHC complexes ===
Cu^{I} and Cu^{II} NHC complexes can be prepared by the methods described above, using either Cu^{I} or Cu^{II} sources. The first to be reported was a [Cu^{I}(NHC)_{2}]^{+} synthesized through method 1 by Arduengo et al. in 1993. Cu^{I} NHC complexes feature the most common oxidation state by far, and the majority of such complexes are synthesized through method 1 or occasionally through method 4. Of the over 650 Cu NHC complexes structurally characterized as of 2019, around half feature 2-coordinate Cu with a linear geometry, another quarter feature 3-coordinate Cu, and the rest mainly feature 4-coordinate Cu. Multinuclear Cu NHC complexes make up less than 10% of those reported. Beyond these general features, the compositional and structural diversity of known Cu NHC complexes is extensive. The most common motif appears to be the [Cu^{I}(NHC)(halide)], which can be very stable, especially with bulky ligand substituents. There are also a handful of reported N-heterocyclic silylene and other NHC-type Cu complexes. Of the three coinage metals discussed, the library of Cu NHC complexes has been historically the least developed, due to comparatively lower stabilities.

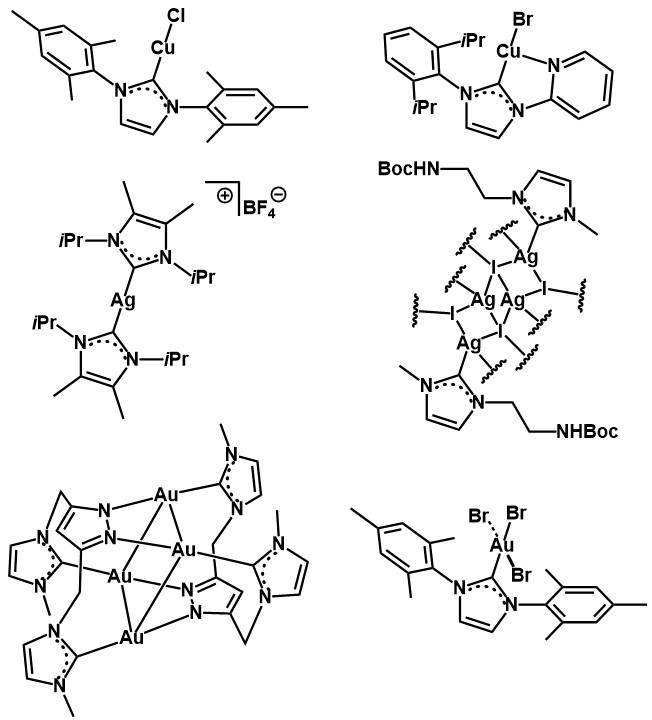
Examples of reported coinage metal NHC complexes displaying various structural types.

=== Silver NHC complexes ===
Ag^{I} NHC complexes can be prepared by the methods described above, using Ag^{I} sources. The first to be reported was a [Ag^{I}(NHC)_{2}]^{+} synthesized through method 1 by Arduengo et al. in 1993. The vast majority of these complexes are synthesized through method 2, due to the ease of using Ag_{2}O with air stable imidazolium salts. Linear, trigonal, and tetrahedral coordination geometries are the most commonly reported, although a wide variety of more complex configurations have also been characterized. Due to the short Ag-Ag distances achievable within NHC complexes, down to 2.7 to 2.8 Å, supramolecular assemblies of complexes can be obtained. Many chiral complexes have also been synthesized using chiral NHC ligands. Similar to the Cu NHC complexes, the most common motif appears to be the [Ag^{I}(NHC)(halide)]. Of the three coinage metals discussed, Ag NHC complexes are the most well-developed and studied, due to the ease of synthesis and the possible routes to other NHC complexes.

=== Gold NHC complexes ===
Au^{I} NHC complexes can be prepared by methods 1, 3, or 4 described above, using Au^{I} sources; method 4 is by far the most common. The other common synthetic route is through the cleavage of electron-rich olefins, such as imidazolidinylidene, with an Au^{I} salt. The first to be reported were a [Au^{I}(NHC)_{2}]^{+} and a [Au^{III}I_{2}(NHC)_{2}]^{+} by Minghetti and Bonati in 1973. Au^{III} NHC complexes, although rarer, are accessible through Au^{III}-coordinated isocyanide ligand cyclization, halogen oxidative addition to Au^{I} NHC complexes, or NHC transfer from group 6 complexes such as (NHC)W(CO)_{5}. As with the other coinage metals, the vast majority of the reported Au NHC complexes have a linear coordination geometry, although a higher coordination number of 4 has been observed for Au^{III}. Multinuclear complexes are also accessible, and have been synthesized to study Au-Au interactions during supramolecular aggregation. Many chiral complexes have also been synthesized using chiral NHC ligands. As with the other coinage metal NHC complexes, the most common supporting ligands are halides or pseudo-halides. Interest in expanding the scope of Au NHC complexes has grown rapidly following the discovery of catalytic applications and the ease of synthesis through Ag^{I} NHC transmetalation.

== Bonding ==
NHCs as ligands are known for their strong σ donation and high structural tunability. More in-depth computational analyses also highlight the role of M to NHC π back-donation, with respect to a description of an M-NHC bond.

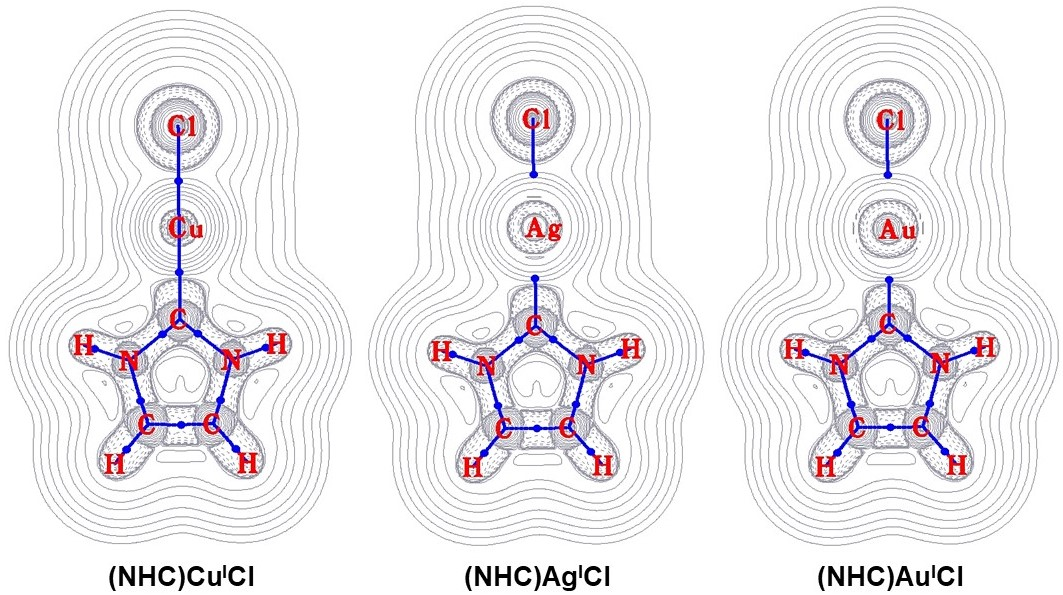
Contour line diagrams of the Laplacian distribution of three (NHC)MCl complexes. Solid contours show charge accumulation; dashed contours show charge depletion; blue lines show bond paths; blue dots show bond critical points. (See Boehme and Frenking 1998 for a thorough discussion).

In an initial analysis of coinage metal NHC bonding from 1998, Boehme and Frenking performed quantum mechanical ab initio calculations for the three M^{I}Cl(imidazol-2-ylidene) complexes, as well as with the corresponding silylene and germylene NHC-type ligands. High metal-ligand bond dissociation energies of 67.4 kcal/mol for M=Cu, 56.5 kcal/mol for M=Ag, and 82.8 kcal/mol for M=Au were calculated. The same trend emerges with the other NHC-type ligands, with Au having a rather strong bond to the NHC, and Ag having the relatively weakest. This suggests an origin for the efficacy of NHC transfer chemistry from Ag NHC complexes, with weaker M-NHC bonds in addition to the straightforward synthetic route described previously. Further charge-decomposition analysis of the three model complexes suggests that the- major contribution to covalent bonding arises from the NHC to M σ donation, with minor M to NHC π back-donation. The backdonation is particularly low when M=Ag, and higher when M=Au, likely due to relativistic effects causing s and p orbital contraction and d and f orbital diffuseness. These computational results are corroborated in Density Functional Theory analyses of other coinage metal NHC complexes. The relative amount of M to NHC π back-donation can increase up to a calculated 15-20% of the total orbital interaction energies, based on the specific electronic and steric profiles of the M NHC complexes. Additionally, comparative studies of Ag and Au monomeric complexes and the corresponding macrometallacyclic complexes indicate that the NHC lone pair interacts with the lowest empty M p orbital in the monomeric cases, but with the lowest empty M s orbital in the cyclic cases.

A Natural Bond Orbital analysis provides calculated charge distributions, which indicate increased NHC carbene p(π) orbital population relative to the free NHC; this can be attributed to increased NHC aromaticity when coordinated to a metal center. Topological analysis of the electron density also shows that all three M-NHC bonds have meaningful ionic character in addition to some covalent character. The Ag-NHC bond shows the most ionic character, while the Au-NHC bond shows the most covalent character. For a series of M(NHC)(halide) and M(NHC)_{2} complexes studied by Nemcsok et al., Energy Decomposition Analysis assigns 68-78% of the attractive interactions to classical electrostatic attraction. Again, the Ag complexes have the lowest calculated M-NHC bond dissociation energies with the highest calculated M-NHC ionic character percentages, while the Au complexes have the highest calculated M-NHC bond dissociation energies with the lowest calculated M-NHC ionic character percentages; the Cu values are intermediate. (Note that electrostatic contributions are just one part of the overall bond dissociation energy calculations; while the Ag-NHC bonds have the greatest percentage of electrostatic contributions into the overall bond dissociation energies, the Au-NHC bonds have the greatest bond dissociation energies in magnitude). Of the remaining covalent character, the majority is calculated to emerge from σ donation; the Cu complexes have the highest calculated percentages of π back-donation contribution. These trends generally match the observations for coinage metal bond strengths where Au > Cu > Ag bonds. Experimental bond length analyses corroborate the computational results, especially with regard to the relative levels of NHC aromaticity and the relative levels of back-donation.

== Applications ==
=== Copper NHC complexes ===
Cu^{I} NHC complexes, and to a lesser extent Cu^{II} NHC complexes, find use mostly as catalysts for organic transformations, as generally more robust analogues to the well-known Cu phosphine complexes. For example, Cu^{I} NHC complexes are effective catalysts for various carboxylation or C-C coupling reactions, oftentimes including utilization of CO_{2} as a C_{1} source. Chiral Cu NHC complexes can also accomplish asymmetric catalysis for reactions such as allylic substitutions or conjugate additions. These applications feature the ability of Cu NHC complexes to activate and functionalize C-H and C-C bonds selectively and efficiently, enabled by tuning the NHC ligand steric and electronic characteristics. Cu^{I} NHC complexes have also shown promising pharmacological applications, with notable antitumor activity attributed to low biotoxicity, sufficient stability to reach sites of interest, and the ability to react with intracellular dioxygen to produce reactive oxygen species which attack DNA.

=== Silver NHC complexes ===
Ag^{I} NHC complexes find the most use as NHC transfer agents, due to the facile synthesis through Ag_{2}O, the relatively labile Ag-NHC bond, and the favorable precipitation of Ag halide salts during transmetalation. This strategy provides access not only to other coinage metal NHC complexes, but also to Pd^{II}, Rh^{I}, Ir^{I}, Ru^{IV}, and other NHC complexes, as well as organic NHC compounds. Ag NHC complexes also show some catalytic applications, the most successful being in situ chiral NHC transfer to Cu during catalysis, which provides different product yields and enantioselectivities than in situ direct generation of a chiral Cu NHC complex. Ag NHC complexes find great use in medicinal chemistry as antimicrobial and anticancer agents, as the NHC ligands can stabilize Ag^{I} ions long enough to penetrate targeted cell walls before slow release to destroy the cells internally. Ag NHC complexes have also been investigated for liquid crystal properties and polymeric nanomaterials.

=== Gold NHC complexes ===
Au^{I} and Au^{III} NHC complexes find use as catalysts, since the NHC ligands can stabilize the gold ions and disfavor the unproductive precipitation of metallic gold. As alkyne and alkene activations are often achieved by these complexes, commonly catalyzed organic transformations are heteroatom additions, cyclizations, and some cross-couplings. Chiral Au^{I} NHC complexes have been applied in asymmetric catalysis with only a few instances of high enantioselectivity. Au^{I} and Au^{III} NHC complexes also find use in pharmacological applications, as with many other gold complexes, showing notable antimicrobial and anticancer activities due to the relative stability of the Au-NHC bond in vivo, the high electron density at the Au^{I} center improving its bactericidal capabilities, and the ability of Au^{I} to bind thiol groups and thus inhibit various enzymes overexpressed in cancer cells.

== See also ==
- Persistent carbene
- N-heterocyclic silylene
- Transmetalation
- Ab initio quantum chemistry methods
- Density functional theory
- Natural bond orbital
