= Carbene analog =

Group of carbenes

Carbene analogs in chemistry are carbenes with the carbon atom replaced by another chemical element. Just as regular carbenes they appear in chemical reactions as reactive intermediates and with special precautions they can be stabilized and isolated as chemical compounds. Carbenes have some practical utility in organic synthesis but carbene analogs are mostly laboratory curiosities only investigated in academia. Carbene analogs are known for elements of group 13, group 14 and group 15.

== Group 13 carbene analogs ==
In group 13 elements the boron carbene analog is called a borylene or boranylidene.

== Group 14 carbene analogs ==
The heavier group 14 carbenes are silylenes, R_{2}Si:, germylenes R_{2}Ge: (example diphosphagermylene), stannylenes R_{2}Sn: and plumbylenes R_{2}Pb:, collectively known as metallylenes and regarded as monomers for polymetallanes. The oxidation state for these compounds is +2 and stability increases with principal quantum number (moving down a row in the periodic table). This makes dichloroplumbylene PbCl_{2} and dichlorostannylene SnCl_{2} stable ionic compounds although they exist as polymers or ion pairs.

Group 14 carbene analogs do not form hybrid orbitals but instead retain (ns)^{2}(np)^{2} electron configuration due to the increasing s p gap for larger elements. Two electrons remain in an s-orbital and therefore their compounds have exclusively singlet ground states and not the triplet ground state which can be observed in carbenes depending on the substituents. The s-orbital (lone pair) is inert and the vacant p-orbital is very reactive. Stable group 14 carbenes require stabilization of this p-orbital which is usually accomplished by coordination of a Cp* ligand or coordination to nitrogen, oxygen or phosphorus containing ligands, although stabilization can be achieved through steric protection alone.

General methods for the synthesis of carbon-substituted (aryl or alkyl) metallylenes are reduction of M^{4+} species or substitution reactions at M^{2+} halides. Stable metallylenes require bulky substituents in order to prevent nucleophilic attack of the metal center at the p-orbital. Examples of these bulky substituents in R_{2}M: are mesityl, Dis (di(trimethylsilyl)methyl) and adamantyl groups. With insufficient steric shielding the metallylene will form a dimer or a polymer. The first isolable dialkylgermylene was synthesised in 1991:

Me_{5}C_{5}GeCl + LiCH(Si(Me_{3}))_{2} → Me_{5}C_{5}GeCH(Si(Me_{3}))_{2}
Me_{5}C_{5}GeCH(Si(Me_{3}))_{2} + LiC(Si(Me_{3}))_{3} → (SiMe_{3})_{3}CGeCH(Si(Me_{3}))_{2}

Stable diarylgermylenes also require bulky ligands:

Ge[N(SiMe_{3})_{2}]_{2} + 2 LiC_{5}H_{3}(C_{10}H_{7})_{2} → Ge[LiC_{5}H_{3}(C_{10}H_{7})_{2}]_{2}

compound	C-M distance (pm)	C-M-C angle (°)	Absorbance (nm)
(Ardip)_{2}Ge	203.3 204.8	113.8	608
(Ardip)_{2}Sn	225.5	117.6	600
(Ardip)_{2}Pb	239.0 238.0	121.5	586
Stable Ge, Sn, Pb metallylenes with Ardip = C_{6}H_{3}-2,6-[C_{6}H_{3}-2,6-(C_{3}H_{7})_{2}]_{2}

The C-M-C bond angle in metallylenes is less than 120° confirming hybridization other than sp^{2}. The higher p-character for the C-M^{II} bond compared to the C-M^{IV} bond is reflected in its slightly higher bond length.

N-heterocyclic silylenes are known to be stable for months and have been studied extensively.

== Group 15 carbene analogs ==
In the group 15 elements the neutral nitrogen carbene analog (RN) is called a nitrene. The phosphorus analog is a phosphinidene. There are charged group 15 carbene analogs as well, most notably phosphenium ions (R_{2}P^{+}) which are isolobal with (hetero-)carbenes possessing a singlet ground state.
