= Chemical trap =

Chemical used to detect unstable compounds

In chemistry, a chemical trap is a chemical compound that is used to detect unstable compounds. The method relies on efficiency of bimolecular reactions with reagents to produce a more easily characterize trapped product. In some cases, the trapping agent is used in large excess.

== Case studies ==
=== Cyclobutadiene ===
A famous example is the detection of cyclobutadiene released upon oxidation of cyclobutadieneiron tricarbonyl. When this degradation is conducted in the presence of an alkyne, the cyclobutadiene is trapped as a bicyclohexadiene. The requirement for this trapping experiment is that the oxidant (ceric ammonium nitrate) and the trapping agent be mutually compatible.

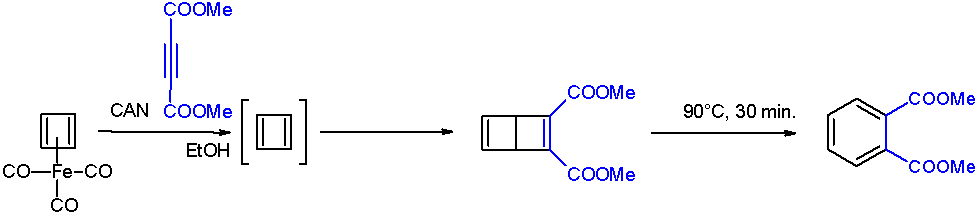

=== Diphosphorus ===
Diphosphorus is an old target of chemists since it is the heavy analogue of N_{2}. Its fleeting existence is inferred by the controlled degradation of certain niobium complexes in the presence of trapping agents. Again, a Diels-Alder strategy is employed in the trapping:

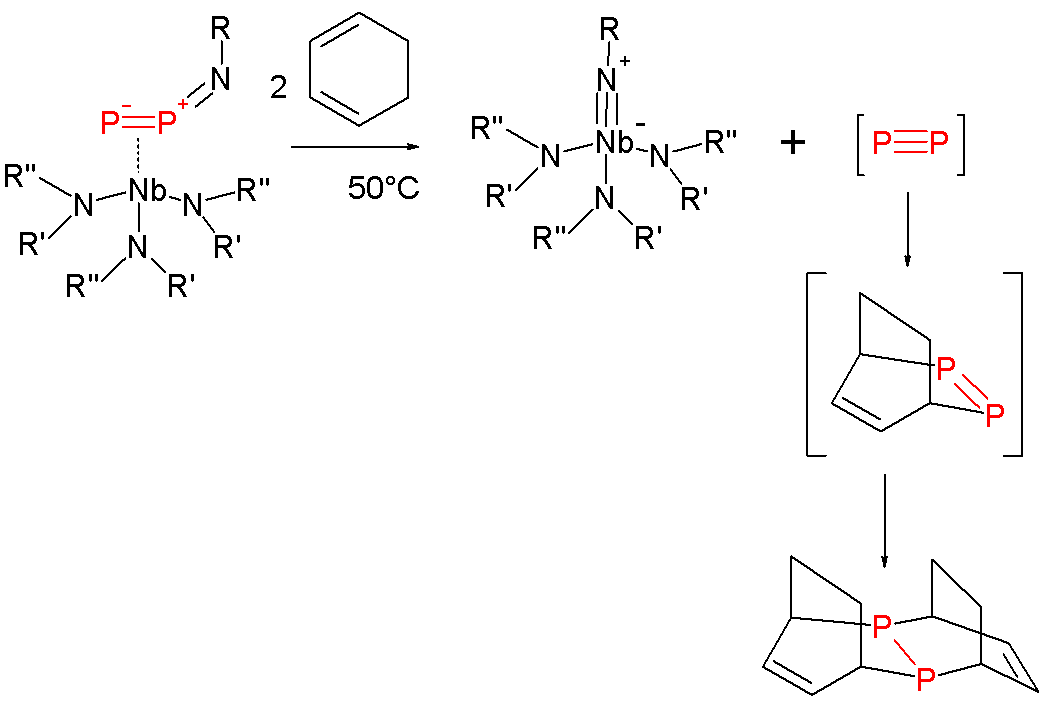

=== Silylene ===
Another classic but elusive family of targets are silylenes, analogues of carbenes. It was proposed that dechlorination of dimethyldichlorosilane generates dimethylsilylene:

SiCl_{2}(CH_{3})_{2} + 2 K → Si(CH_{3})_{2} + 2 KCl

This inference is supported by conducting the dechlorination in the presence of trimethylsilane, the trapped product being pentamethyldisilane:

Si(CH_{3})_{2} + HSi(CH_{3})_{3} → (CH_{3})_{2}Si(H)-Si(CH_{3})_{3}

Not that the trapping agent does not react with dimethyldichlorosilane or potassium metal.

== Related meanings ==
In some cases, chemical trap is used to detect or infer a compound when present at concentrations below its detection limit or is present in a mixture, where other components interfere with its detection. The trapping agent, for example a dye, reacts with the chemical to be detected, giving a product that is more easily detected.
