= Diphosphagermylene =

Class of compounds

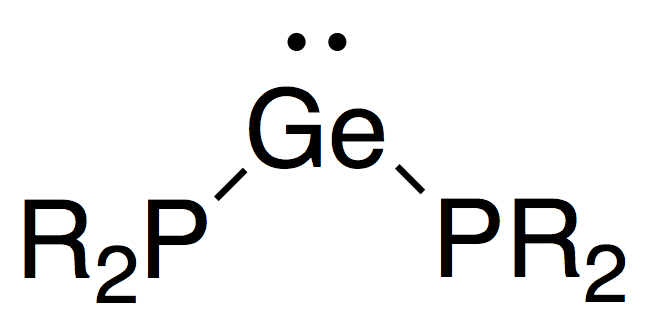
Diphosphagermylene.

Diphosphagermylenes are a class of compounds containing a divalent germanium atom bound to two phosphorus atoms. While these compounds resemble diamidocarbenes, such as N-heterocyclic carbenes (NHC), diphosphagermylenes display bonding characteristics distinct from those of diamidocarbenes. In contrast to NHC compounds, in which there is effective N-C p(π)-p(π) overlap between the lone pairs of planar nitrogens and an empty p-orbital of a carbene, systems containing P-Ge p(π)-p(π) overlap are rare. Until 2014, the geometry of phosphorus atoms in all previously reported diphosphatetrylenes are pyramidal, with minimal P-Ge p(π)-p(π) interaction. It has been suggested that the lack of p(π)-p(π) in Ge-P bonds is due to the high energetic barrier associated with achieving a planar configuration at phosphorus, which would allow for efficient p(π)-p(π) overlap between the phosphorus lone pair and the empty P orbital of Ge. The resulting lack of π stabilization contributes to the difficulty associated with isolating diphosphagermylene and the Ge-P double bonds. However, utilization of sterically encumbering phosphorus centers has allowed for the isolation of diphosphagermylenes with a planar phosphorus center with a significant P-Ge p(π)-p(π) interaction.

== Preparation of diphosphagermylenes ==
=== Synthesis of P-Ge σ-only diphosphagermylenes ===
Reactivity of sterically demanding lithium (fluorosilyl)silylphosphanides with GeI_{2} yields green, cubic crystals in moderate yield. The identity of this species was investigated using only multinuclear NMR, elemental analysis, and UV-vis. Computational calculations (at the CIS level with the ab initio Los Alamos pseudopotential method (LAN L 1 DZ)) of the diphosphagermylene electronic structure was in agreement experimentally-derived electronic transition values. Due to disorder, the crystal structure of the diphosphagermylene could not be investigated.

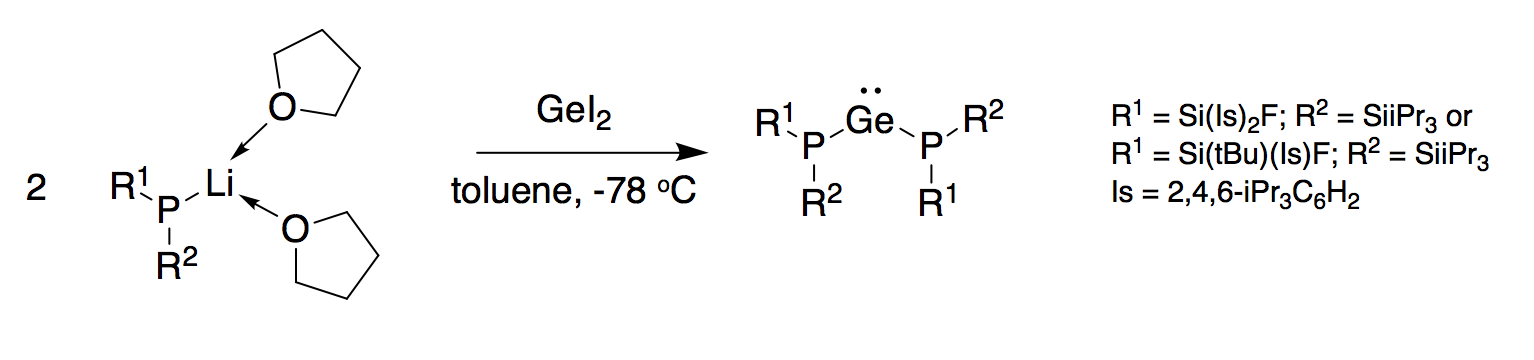
Synthesis of monomeric σ-only diphosphagermylenes.

=== Synthesis of P-Ge π-stabilized diphosphagermylenes ===
The sterically encumbered germylene ligand (Dipp)_{2}PH, where Dipp=2,6-iPr_{2}C_{6}H_{3}, was synthesized by the addition of PCl_{3} to DippLi-(OEt_{2}), followed by the addition of LiAlH_{4}. (Dipp)_{2}PH was added to PhCH_{2}K, which is combined with GeCl_{2} to provide (Dipp_{2}P)_{2}Ge. The synthesis resulted in dark red crystals suitable for x-ray crystallography. The identity of the compound was confirmed by elemental analysis, multinuclear NMR, and x-ray crystallography. This compound is stable in the absence of air and water.

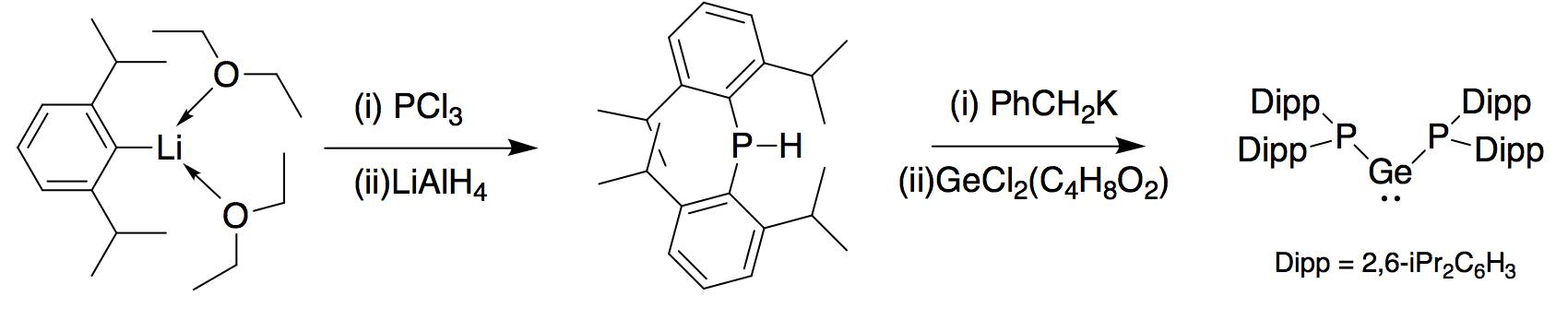
Synthesis of p(π)-p(π) stabilized diphosphagermylenes ((Dipp_{2}P)_{2}Ge).

== Structure ==
=== P-Ge σ-only system: Driess's diphosphagermylene ===
While crystals were formed of Driess's diphosphagermylene, the X-ray structure diphosphagermylene could not be analyzed due to disordering. It has been suggested that the three lone pairs in Driess's diphosphagermylene system are composed of Ge (4s, 4p) and P (3s, 3p) valence orbitals. Driess calculated (MP2/DZ+POL//RHF/DZ+ZPE) the reaction profile for the isomerization of E(PH_{2})_{2} (E = Si, Ge, Sn, Pb) from a σ-only, carbene-like system to a tautomer containing trivalent E with a π bond between E and phosphorus. The authors observed that the carbene-like form is preferred over its tautomer for silicon, germanium, tin, and lead analogues.

=== P-Ge p(π)-p(π) Stabilized Systems: ((Dipp)_{2}P)_{2}Ge and ((Tripp)_{2}P)_{2}Ge ===
P-substituted heavier group 14 analogues (Si, Ge, Sn, Pb) of diaminocarbenes are less established. It has been suggested this is due to a high energetic barrier associated with achieving a planar configuration at phosphorus, which would enable p(π)-p(π) overlap between the P lone pair and the empty p orbital of the group 14 center. Differences in donation ability of phosphorus versus nitrogen likely do not play a role in achieving p(π)-p(π) overlap because calculations indicate that the π donor capacity of phosphorus is similar to that of nitrogen. Consequently, all P atoms in reports on diphosphatetrylenes previous to ((Dipp)_{2}P)_{2}Ge contain pyramidal P with Ge-P bonds of exclusively σ character. By utilizing sterically encumbered (Dipp)P ligands, p(π)-p(π) in diphosphagermylene was achieved. This compound crystallizes as discrete monomers and is the first crystallographically characterized diphosphagermylene with a two-coordinate Ge center.

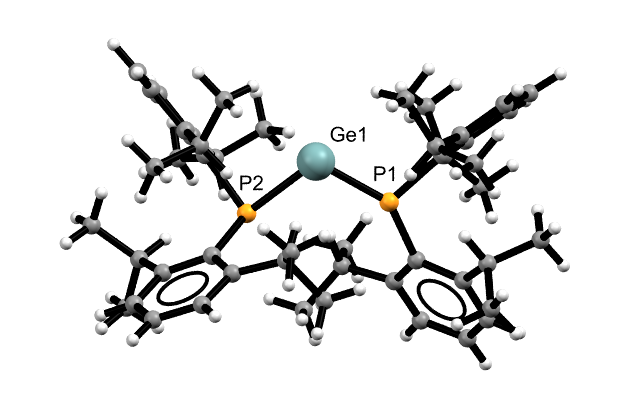
Ball and stick model with bond lengths and angles derived from the crystal structure of ((Dipp)_{2}P)_{2}Ge.

By crystal structure analysis, the bond lengths of the two germanium-phosphorus bonds are 2.2337 Å (P1-Ge) and 2.3823 Å (P2-Ge). While the phosphorus center of P1-Ge is pyramidal, the P2-Ge phosphorus is trigonal planar. Moreover, the planes of P1-Ge-P2 and C-P1-Ge are nearly in coincident. These results are consistent with multiple bond character between a trigonal planar phosphorus (P1) and Ge. It has been suggested that only one P of the diphosphagermylene is planar because there is competition between the two phosphorus lone pairs and the empty P orbitals at the Ge center if both phosphorus atoms are planar. This would result in a weaker P-Ge interaction that would not be sufficient to overcome the energy of planarizing both P atoms.

In addition, ((Dipp)_{2}P)_{2}Ge was modified such that an iPr groups was added to the para position of (Dipp)_{2}P, to make (Tripp)_{2}P. The donating effect of an additional iPr group has little effect on the bonding and structure of the diphosphagermylene.

==== Solution and solid state nuclear magnetic resonance (NMR) ====
A single, broad singlet is observed at 3.2 ppm at room temperature in the solution state phosphorus nuclear magnetic resonance (PNMR) of ((Dipp)_{2}P)_{2}Ge. This signal is consistent with rapid exchange between the planar and pyramidal phosphorus centers. As the temperature is reduced to -80 C, the signal becomes two broad, equal intensity singlets at -42.0 ppm and 8.0.

Two peaks with isotropic chemical shifts of 81.9 and -61.6 ppm, in a 1:1 ratio are observed in the solid state PNMR. No other signals are observed in the PNMR. In general diphosphagermylenes with pyramidal phosphorus centers exhibit a chemical shift close to those of free phosphine. In addition, planar phosphorus centers of Ge^{IV}=P compounds generally have a downfield PNMR shift. Consequently, peaks at 81.9 and -61.6 ppm have been assigned as planar and pyramidal phosphorus centers of ((Dipp)_{2}P)_{2}Ge, respectively. This has been supported by DFT calculations that predict PNMR shifts of planar and pyramidal phosphorus centers of ((Dipp)_{2}P)_{2}Ge are at 100 and -61 ppm.

==== Natural bond orbital (NBO) analysis ====
Natural bond orbital analysis has been carried out on the P-Ge p(π)-p(π) system, ((Dipp)_{2}P)_{2}Ge. Inspection of the molecular orbitals reveals that the HOMO-1 consists of a π orbital, resulting from donation from the planar P lone pair into the empty P orbital of the germylene center. Natural bond orbital analysis reveals that this bond is 77% P-based and 0.3 eV higher in energy than the P-Ge σ bond. In contrast, the lone pair of the pyramidal phosphorus center is essentially sp hybridized and directed away from the germanium center. The germanium lone pair is predominantly s-character. Wiberg bond indices for Ge-P1 and Ge-P2 bonds are 1.33 and 0.89, respectively, which is consistent with a double bond between Ge-P1 and a single bond between Ge-P2.

==== Atoms in molecules (AIM) analysis ====
Atoms in molecules analysis of ((Dipp)_{2}P)_{2}Ge suggests that there is a double bond between P1-Ge. Bond order can be assessed by measuring the ellipticity, a measure of anisotropic electron density, at the bond critical point. For example, butane, ethylene, and ethyne have a bond ellipticity of 0.01, 0.30, and 0.00 respectively, which correspond to a single, double, and a triple bond. A bond critical point between P1-Ge with ρ=0.091 and ellipticity 0.297 was observed in ((Dipp)_{2}P)_{2}Ge, consistent with a double bond. This contrasts ρ=0.083 and ellipticity 0.064 at the bond critical point of P2-Ge in ((Dipp)_{2}P)_{2}Ge. Delocalization index (DI) was also used to predict the bond order of ((Dipp)_{2}P)_{2}Ge. DI values for P1-Ge and P2-Ge were determined to be 1.275 and 0.843, consistent with a P1-Ge double bond and Wiberg bond indices calculated.
