= Germylene =

Class of germanium (II) compounds

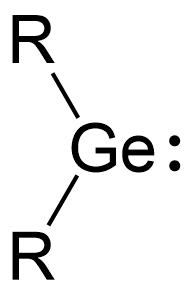
General structure of germylene

Germylenes are a class of germanium(II) compounds with the general formula :GeR_{2}. They are heavier carbene analogs. However, unlike carbenes, whose ground state can be either singlet or triplet depending on the substituents, germylenes have exclusively a singlet ground state. Unprotected carbene analogs, including germylenes, has a dimerization nature. Free germylenes can be isolated under the stabilization of steric hindrance or electron donation. The synthesis of first stable free dialkyl germylene was reported by Jutzi, et al in 1991.

== Structures and bonding ==
Bonding situation for germylene is distinctively different from that for its light analog carbene. The carbon atom from carbene is sp^{2} hybridized. Although germylenes still have some sp^{2} hybridization character, the larger energy gap between s and p-orbitals for germanium permits the retainment of 4s^{2}4p^{2} electron configuration to some degree. The bond angle for H_{2}Ge and Me_{2}Ge was found to be: H-Ge-H 93° and C-Ge-C: 98°, which is smaller than 120°, the ideal bond angle for sp^{2} hybridized structure and thus proves the 4s^{2}4p^{2} valence electron configuration nature of germylene. The lone pair of germylene tends to stay in the high-s-character orbital which is relatively inert, making germylene exclusively singlet.

Dimerization of germylenes lead to the formation of germylene dimers (R_{2}Ge=GeR_{2}). Digermylene dimers (as well as the higher-order digermynes) have a trans-bent structure quasi-tetrahedral at each germanium atom. Consequently the dimerization is believed to proceed through two donor-acceptor adducts instead of the triplet double-pairing found during carbene dimerization.

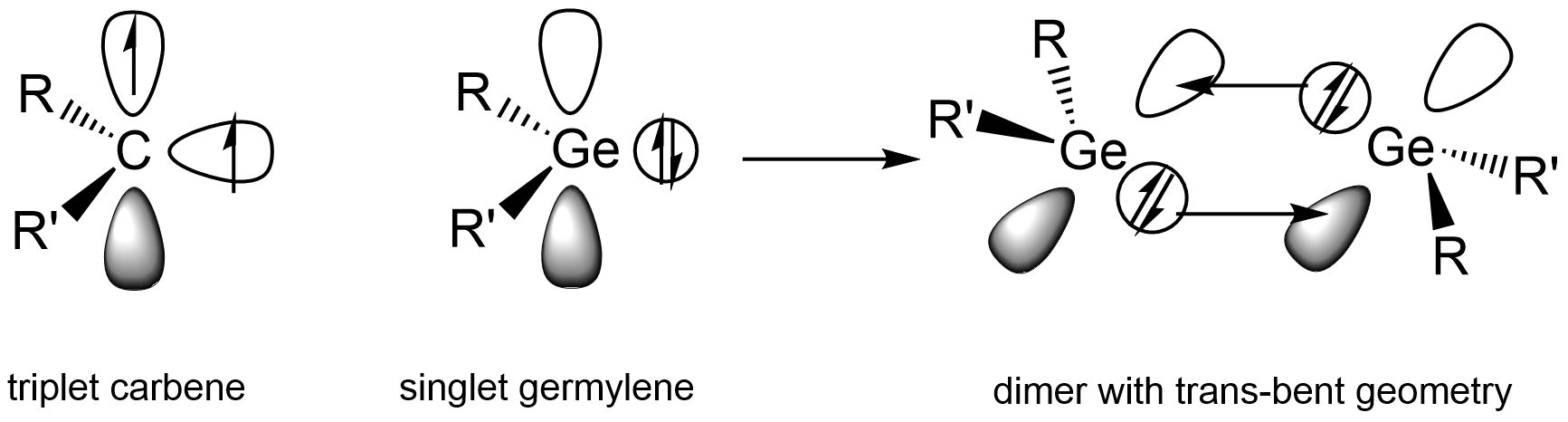
Orbitals and electron configuration of triplet carbene and singlet germylene, double donor-acceptor interaction in a germylene dimer

== Synthesis ==
=== Stabilization ===
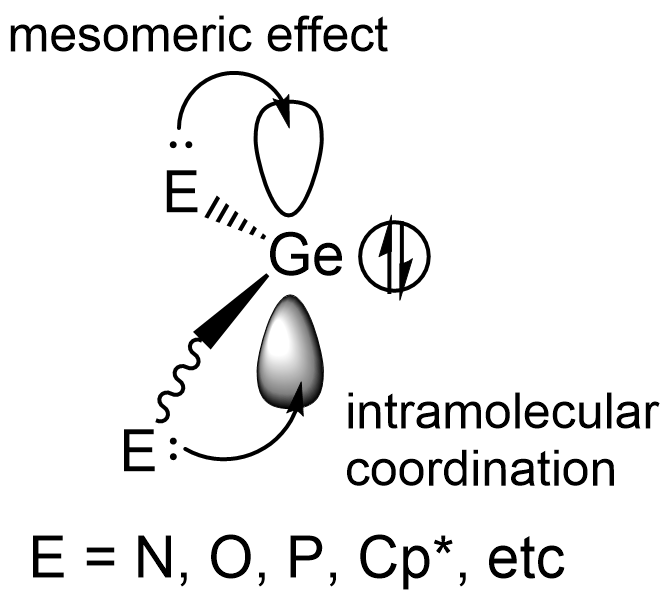
Thermodynamic stabilization of germylene

Dimerization of free germylenes does not have a noticeable energy barrier, which means that the dimerization reaction is almost spontaneous and diffusion limited, so the free germylene monomers without stabilization could dimerize or further polymerize once they form. Free germylenes have to be stabilized kinetically or thermodynamically due to their high reactivity originating from the vacant p-orbital. Thermodynamical stabilization of this p-orbital is usually realized by coordination of a pentamethylcyclopentadiene (Cp*) ligand or of nitrogen (N), oxygen (O) or phosphorus (P) containing ligands, which are able to donate electrons and thus deactivate the vacant p-orbitals. At the same time, stabilization can be accomplished by steric protection of bulky R groups like mesityl groups (Mes) to prevent nucleophiles from getting close to the germanium center.

=== Synthesis of carbon substituted germylenes ===
Carbon substituents is different from other heteroatom N, O, P substituents which have lone pairs in that they provide less electronic perturbations. As a result, a stronger steric and electronic stabilization is required to guarantee a monomeric product. Carbon substituted germylenes can be synthesized using various methods: (1) reduction of dibromogermanes with reducing agents like lithium naphthalene (LiNp) or potassium graphite (KC_{8}), etc., (2) photolysis of strained cyclogermanes or Ge(IV) species, (3) substitution of a dihalo Ge(II) precursor species with nucleophiles like organometallic ligands (e.g. RLi/RMgBr).

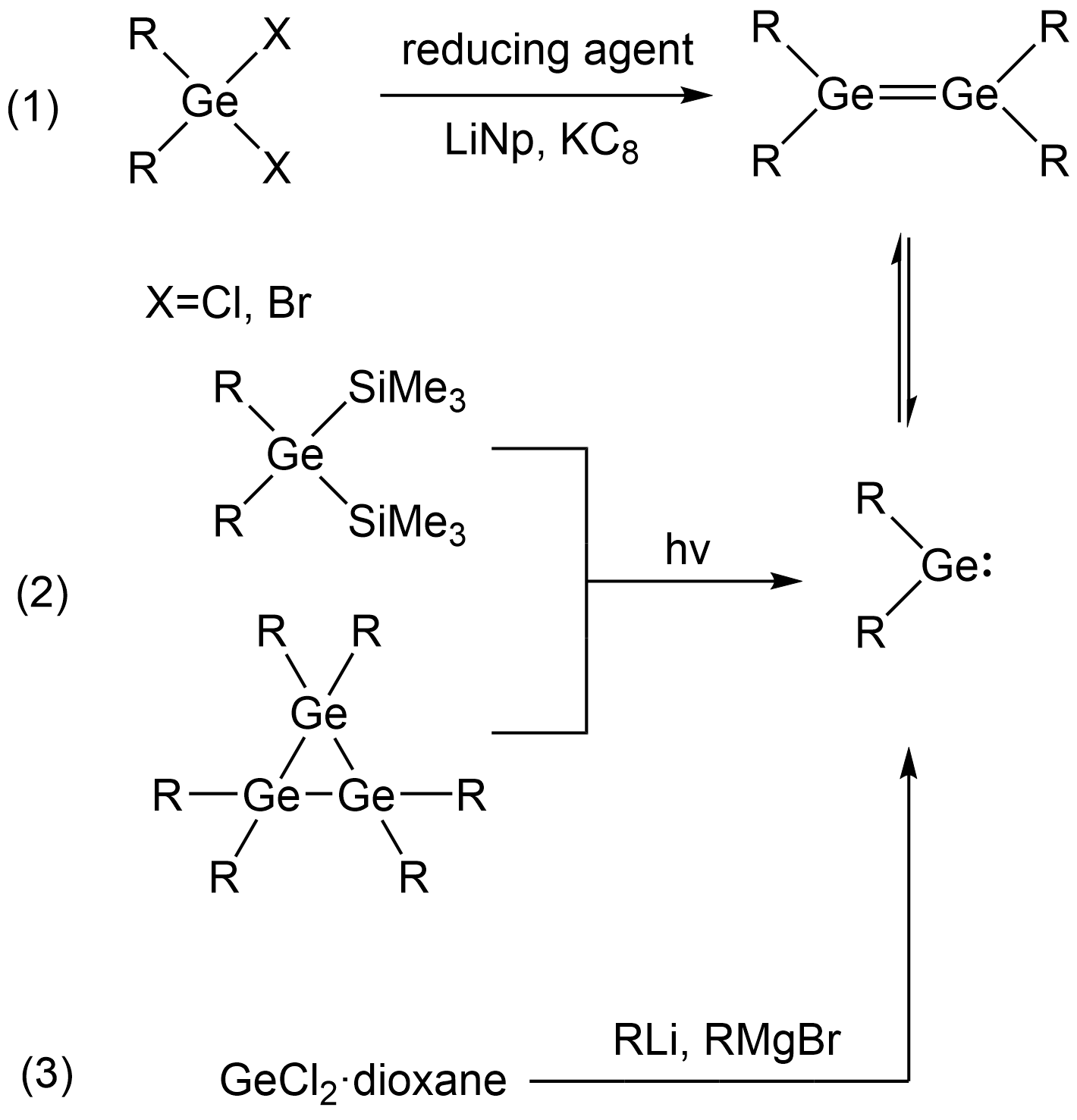
Synthetic methods for stable germylenes

=== Synthesis of n-heterocyclic germylene and cyclic(alkyl)(amino)germylene ===
The introduction of heteroatom in the ligand backbone enhances the stability of reactive Ge(II) center by electron donation from N lone pair to vacant p-orbitals of germanium center. Typically, the strategy for synthesizing five-membered N-heterocyclic tetrylene involves the reaction between N-substituted 1,4-diaza-1,3-butadiene, the alkali metal based reducing agents and group 14 halides. In the case of n-heterocyclic germylene (NHGe) synthesis, the method involves an initial reduction of N-substituted 1,4-diaza-1,3-butadiene by lithium. The following cyclization of the dianion with the corresponding Ge(II) halides gives the final product.

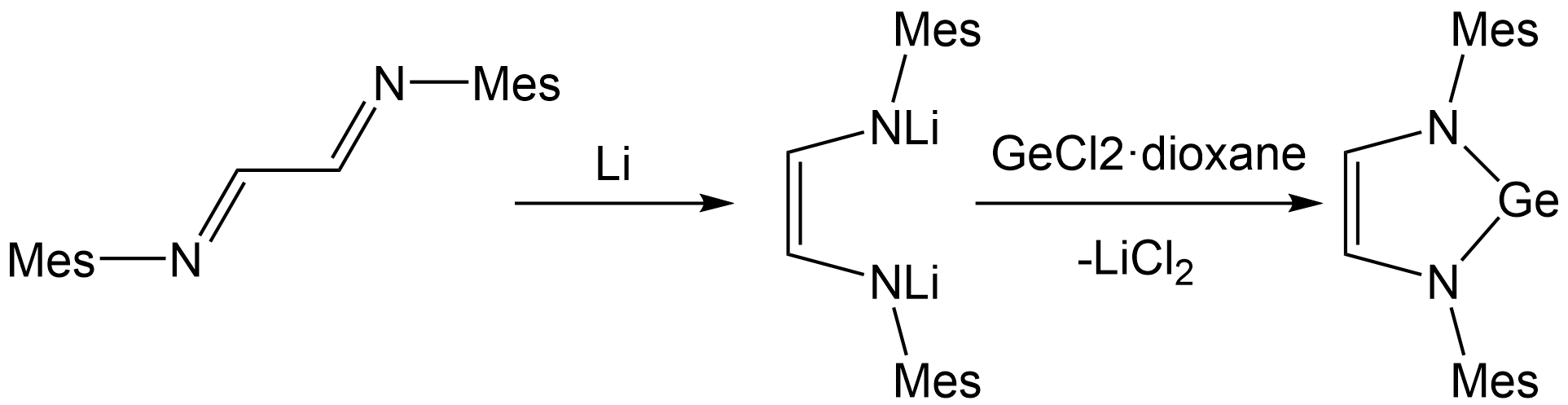
Synthesis of NHGe

The cyclic(alkyl)(amino)carbenes (CAACs) has already been known as both a better donor and better acceptor than n-heterocyclic carbenes (NHCs) due to its higher highest occupied molecular orbital (HOMO) and lower lowest unoccupied molecular orbital (LUMO).

The synthetic strategy of CAAGe involves the synthesis of a α-β-unsaturated imine from a ketone and an amine via condensation followed by the treatment with GeCl_{2}·dioxane. The resulting product is then reduced with KC_{8} to give CAAGe. Analogous to CAAC, the electrophilicity of the germanium center can be obviously enhanced by the substitution of a π-donating and σ-withdrawing amino group along with σ-donating trimethylsilyl groups.

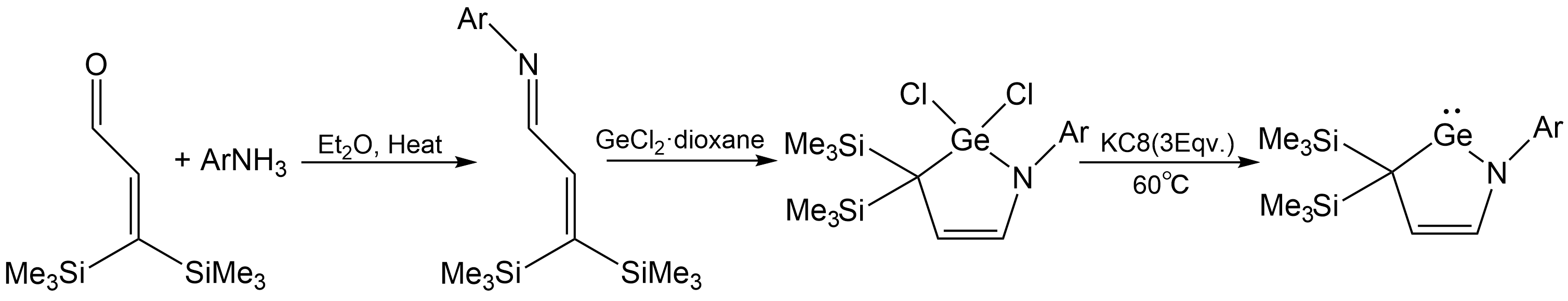
Synthesis of CAAGe

=== Synthesis of a unique homoconjugation stabilized germylene ===
In 2016, Muller et al reported the synthesis of a unique homoconjugation stabilized germylene in a relatively high yield by the reaction between hafnocene dichloride and dipotassium germacyclopentadienediide in THF at -80 °C. The product is stabilized by a remote interaction between a C=C double bond and vacant p-orbital of Ge center through homoconjugation. This stabilization strategy results in a special structural which possesses unusual reactivity.

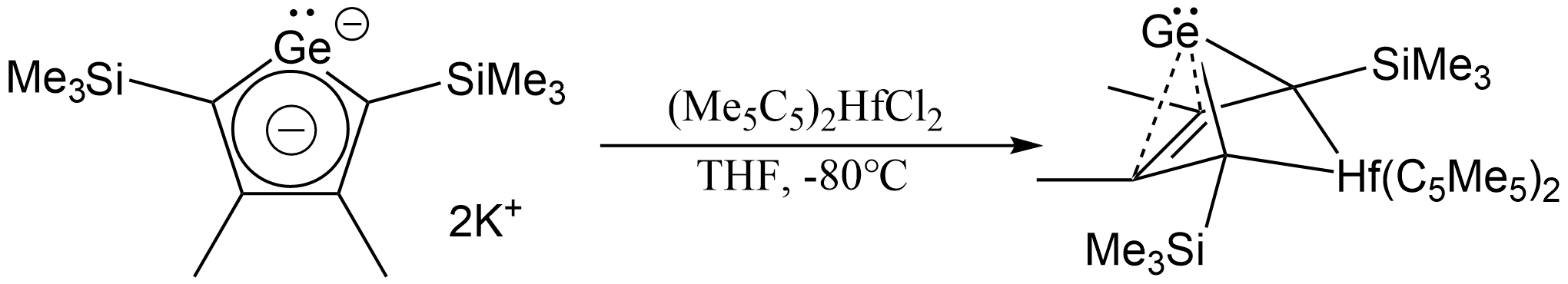
Synthesis of a homoconjugation stabilized germylene

=== Synthesis of PGeP pincer compounds ===
The pincer based germylene is of great importance not only for their ability to stabilize transition metal species via chelation effects in homogeneous catalysis, but also for its serving as a good luminescence source. A PNHNHP ligand was used to synthesize the PGeP pincer stabilized germylene by treatment with two equivalents of potassium hexamethyldisilazide (KHMDS) and GeCl_{2}·dioxane, which finally leads to the formation of the PGeP pincer compound.

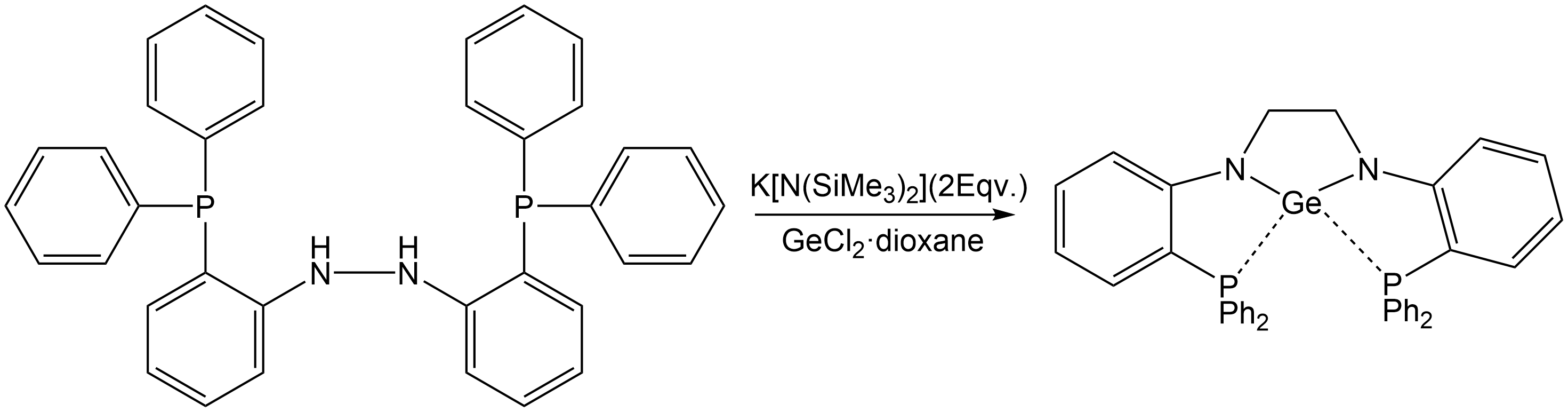
Synthesis of PGeP pincer compounds

== Reactivity ==
=== Oligomerization and polymerization ===
Dimerization of carbon substituted germylenes gives R_{2}Ge=GeR_{2} dimers which could further polymerize to form polygermanes (R_{2}Ge)_{n} compounds. The dimer could show a certain stability if prepared in an independent way. Bulkier substituents are able to reduce the polymerization rate by steric effect. More steric hindrance could even stop the polymerization or dimerization reactions and renders a germylene thermodynamically stable.

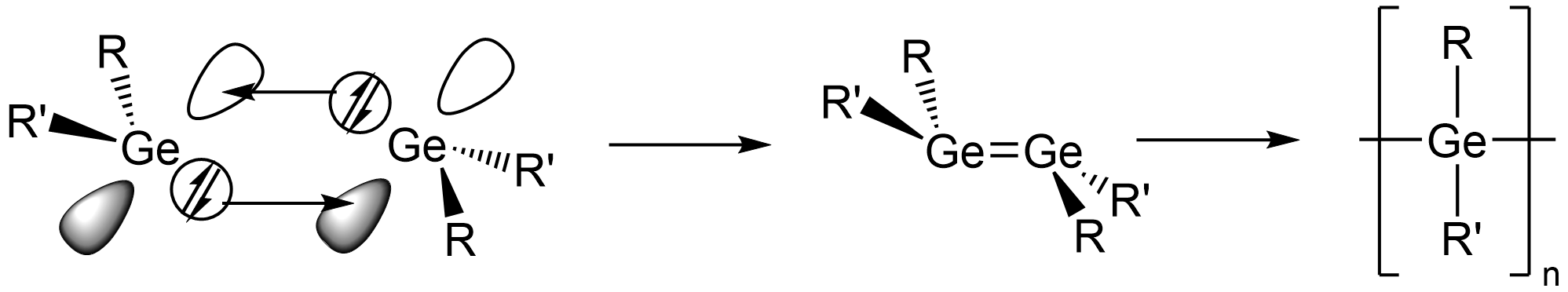
Dimerization and polymerization of germylene

=== Insertion into σ bond ===
R_{2}Ge insertion into C-C bonds has not been reported so far. However, going down the group 14, C-E (E = Si, Ge, Sn, Pb) bonds become more accessible for R_{2}Ge insertion. The strained C-Ge bonds allow insertion of germylene to 7,7-dialkyl-7-germanorbornadienes in the melt, forming digermabicy-clooctadienes.

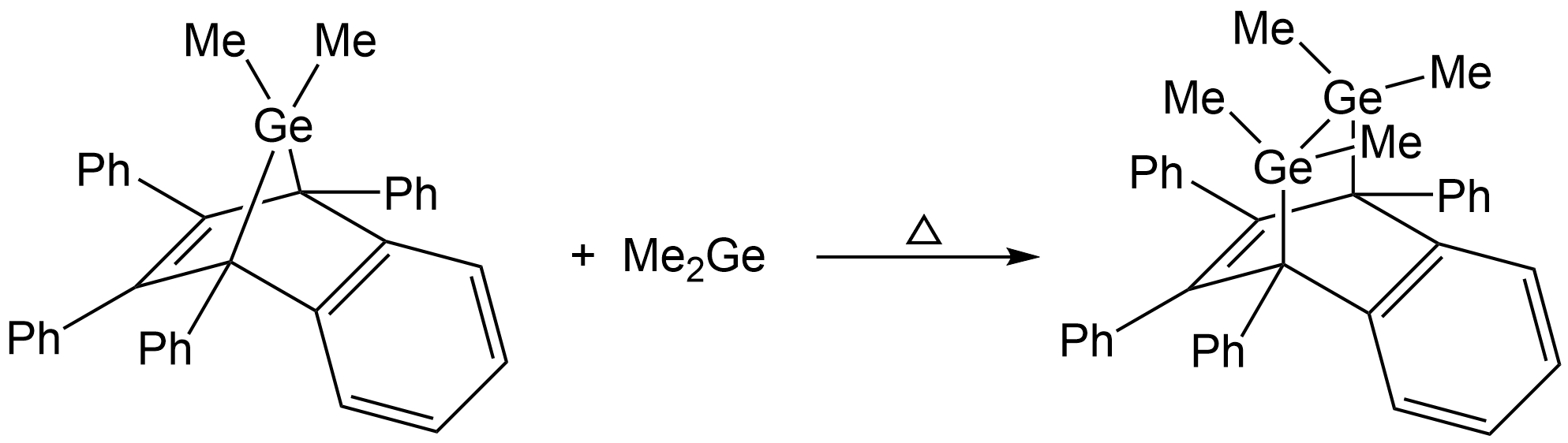
Insertion into C-Ge bond

C-H bonds are generally unreactive toward germylene insertion. However, strain release may help to overcome the activation energy barrier.

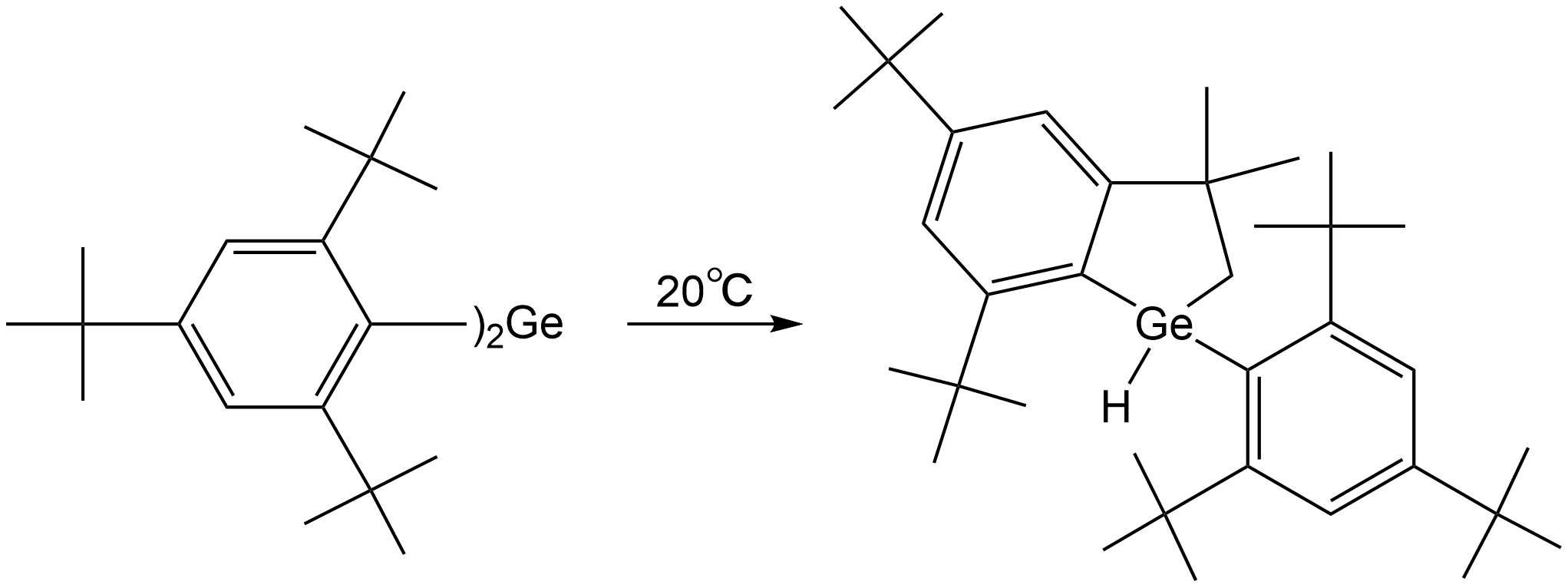
Insertion into C-H bond

Insertion to carbon-halide bonds is common for germylene. The mechanism for insertion of free Me_{2}Ge into the C-Br bond of benzyl bromide was reported to be a two-step, radical abstraction-recombination process under thermal and photolytical conditions. An identical mechanism through a caged singlet radical pair was proposed for C-Cl bond insertion. However, the interaction between halogen electrons and empty p-orbital of the germylene may result in the formation of a donor-acceptor complex before occurrence of any of the insertion mechanisms.

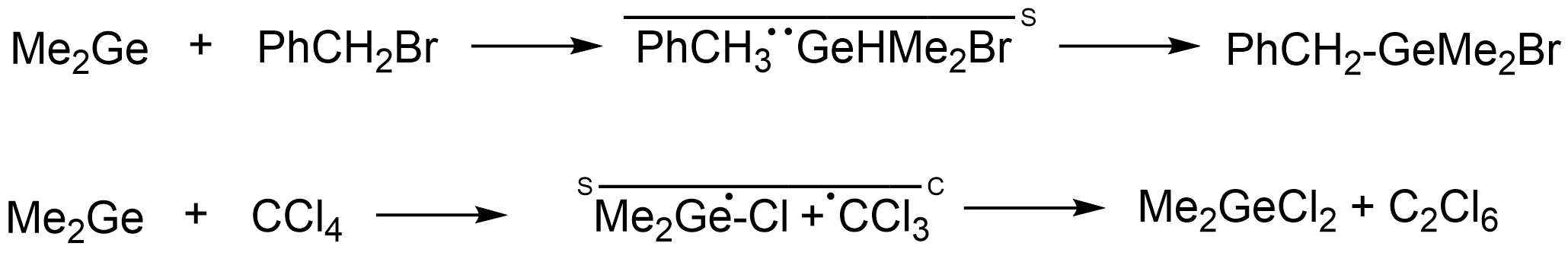
Reaction mechanisms for insertion into C-Hal bonds

The insertion into the C-Hal bond in alkyne compounds go by a one-step mechanism under thermal or photolytical conditions.

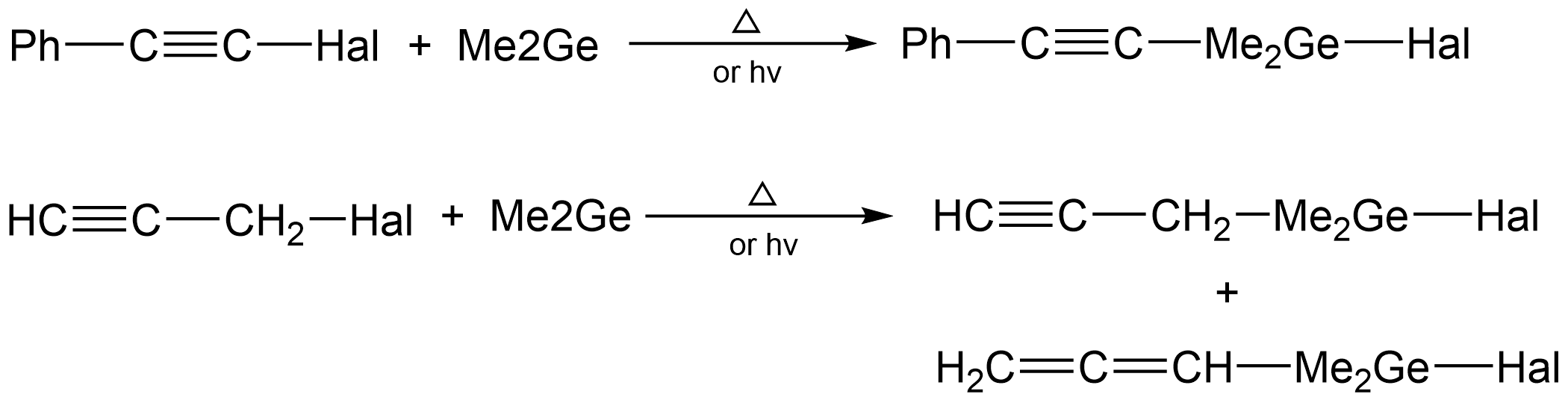
Reaction for insertion into C-Hal bonds in alkynes

For C-O, the R_{2}Ge insertion product could only remain stable at a very low temperature.

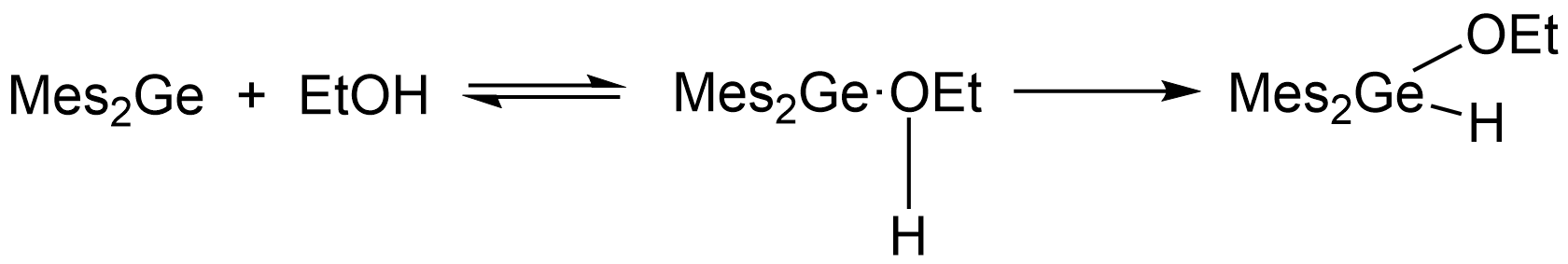
Insertion into C-O bond

=== Addition to unsaturated systems ===
Addition reaction of Me_{2}Ge to unsaturated systems is well studied. As mentioned above, dimerization and polymerization of Me_{2}Ge does not have a noticeable activation energy barrier and is only controlled by diffusion. As a result, addition reactions should be rapid enough complete before getting polygermanes as products.

There is no reaction between simple alkenes and free germylenes. However, styrenes and α-substituted styrenes are able to react with Me_{2}Ge. The resulting product is a 1:1 mixture of the syn and anti-isomers of 3,4-diphenyl-3,4-R-1,1-dimethyl-1-germacyclopentane.

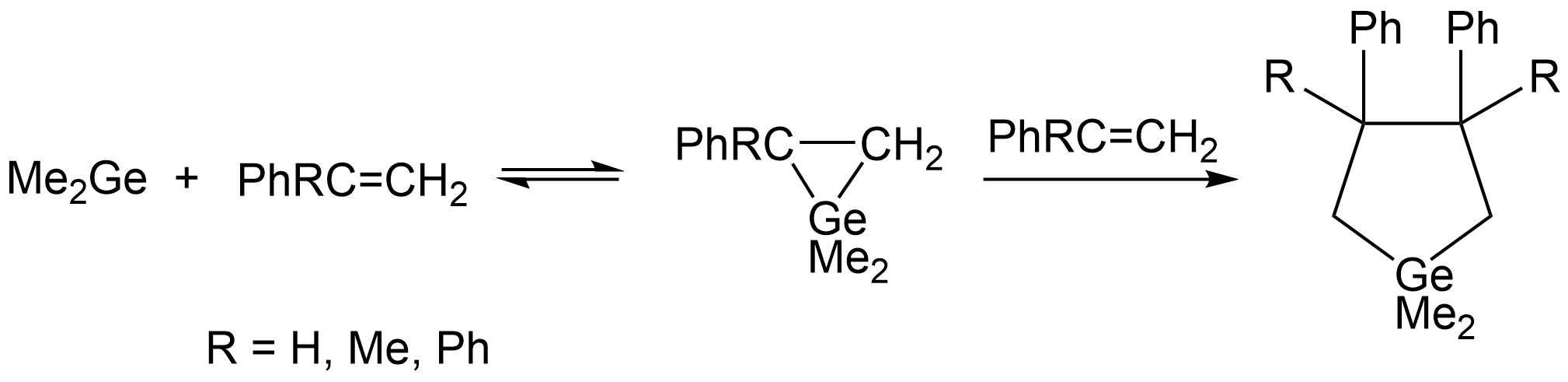
Addition to styrenes

A variety of 1,2-substituted-vinylgermyl compounds can be synthesized in both high yield and high regioselectivity by addition of germylene to alkynes.

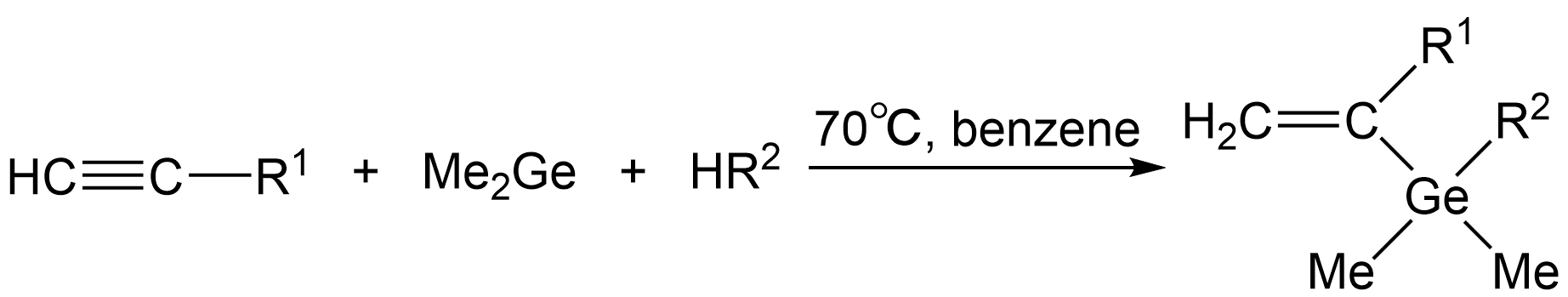
Addition to alkynes

1,4-Cycloaddition of conjugated (hetero-)dienes by free germylenes gives the corresponding 5-membered ring.

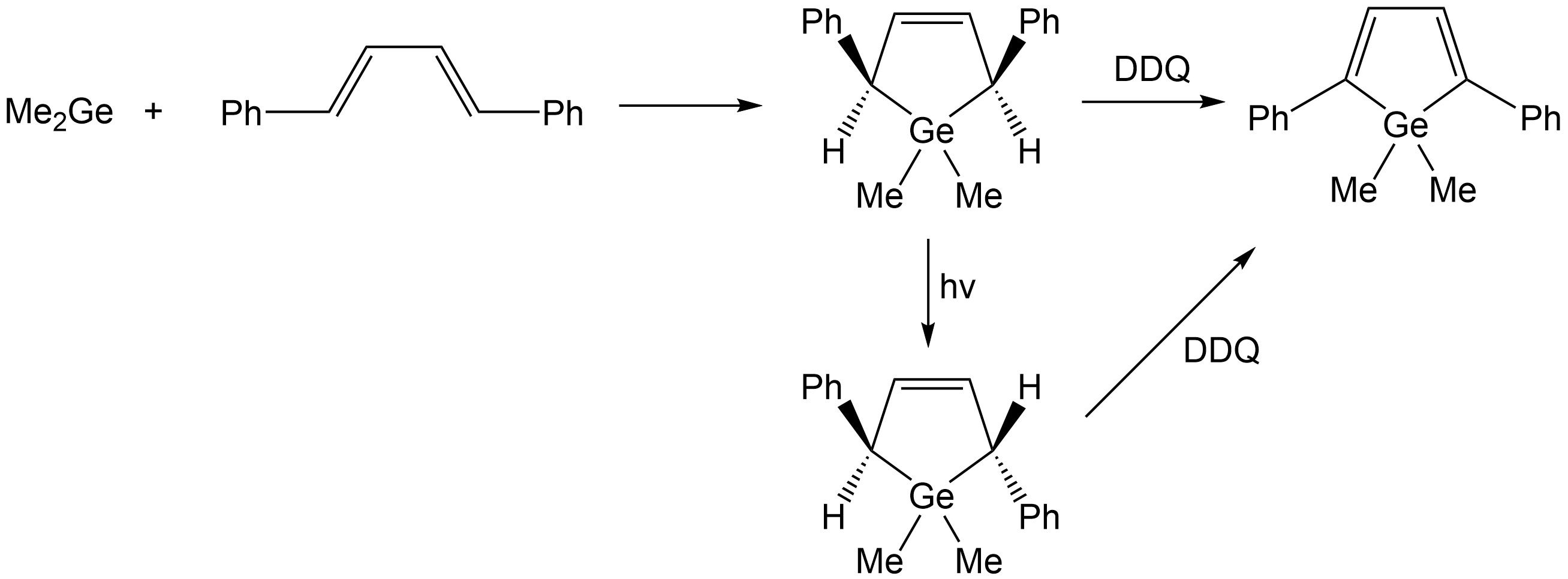
Addition to conjugated (hetero-)dienes

Germylenes reacts only with one of the strained double bonds in cumulated systems like allenes (C=C=C). Germylenes prefer to react with more electron-deficient allenes.

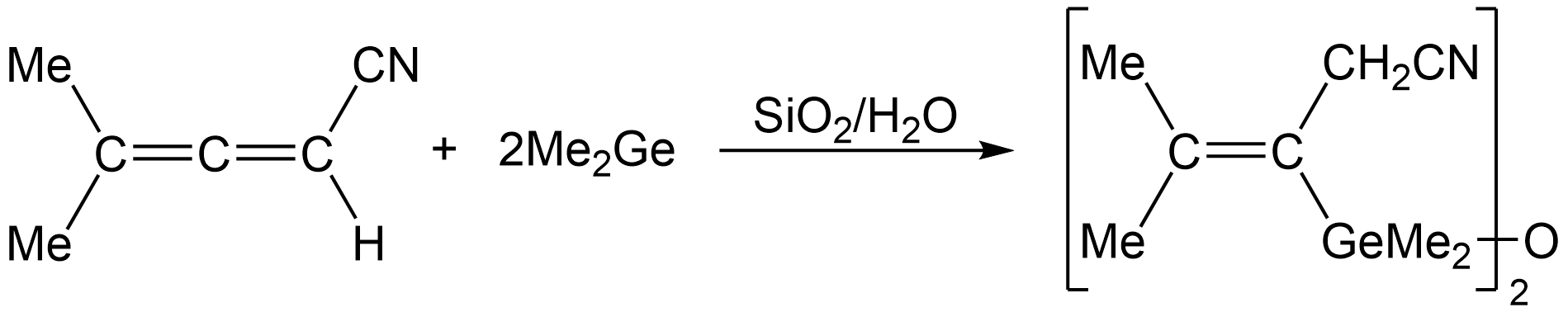
Addition to allenes

=== Complexation by donors ===
During complexation with donors, the germylenes stay in the singlet ground state, where the lone pair is placed in the high-s-character orbital, while the heteroatom-containing donors like R_{2}O, ROH, R_{2}S, R_{3}P, R_{3}N and RCl interact with the vacant p-orbital at germanium center, which could stabilize the singlet germylene and prevent further polymerization. Most of the complexes are stable in room temperature. The absorption bands of adducts commonly exhibits shorter wavelengths in comparison to those of the free germylenes due to substituent-influenced n-p transitions at the Ge center.

=== Germylene catalyzed reaction ===
Germylenes could also act as catalysts as transition metals do. Oxidative addition and reductive elimination, along with the related M^{n+}/M^{(n+2)+} redox couples are of great significance to the transition metal catalysis. Due to the electronic structure and chemical properties of germylenes, including the empty p-orbital, germylenes are able to activated small molecules and give the corresponding Ge(IV) complexes, which raised researchers' interests in germylenes' acting as spectator ligands in certain catalytic cycles. However, subsequent regeneration of Ge(II) compound through reductive elimination is not thermodynamically favored for germylenes.^{[11]} The key of germylene catalysis chemistry is to maintain a balance between oxidative addition and reductive elimination. One example of germylene catalyzed reaction is hydroboration of CO_{2}, where a preliminary hydrogermylation of CO_{2} step is followed by the formation of methanol derivatives with 3 equivalent of catecholborane to regenerate the germylene compound.

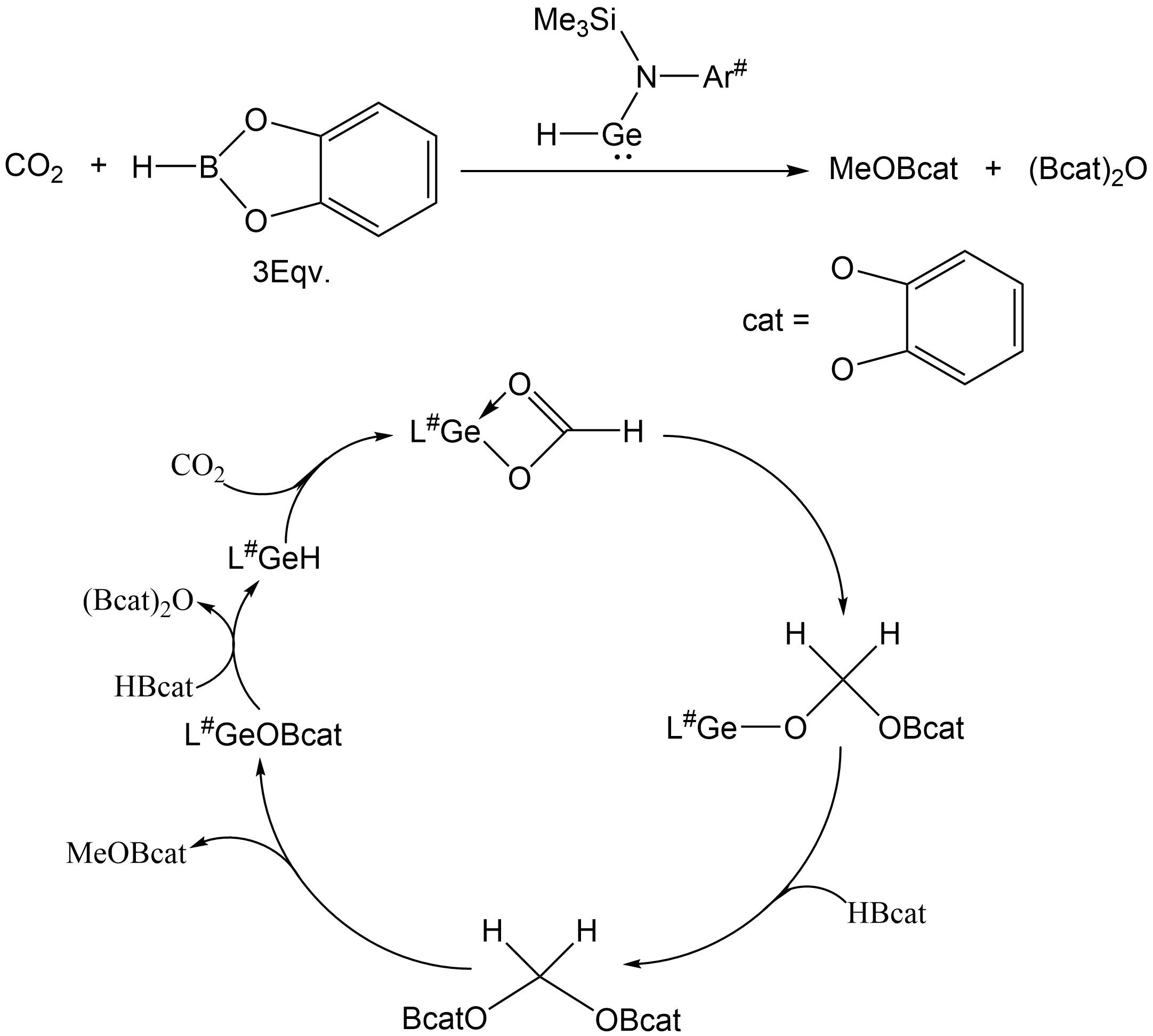
Hydroboration of CO_{2} using germylene catalyst and its catalytic cycle

== See also ==
- Carbene analogs
- Silylene
- Stannylene
