= Decamethylsilicocene =

Chemical Compound

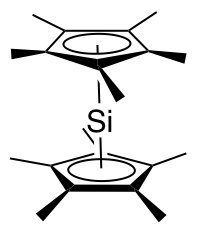
Decamethylsilicocene

Decamethylsilicocene, (C_{5}Me_{5})_{2}Si, is a group 14 sandwich compound. It is an example of a main-group cyclopentadienyl complex; these molecules are related to metallocenes but contain p-block elements as the central atom. It is a colorless, air sensitive solid that sublimes under vacuum.

== Synthesis ==
The first synthesis of decamethylsilicocene was reported by Jutzi and coworkers in 1986. It involved reduction of bis(pentamethylcyclopentadienyl)silicon(IV) dichloride with two equivalents of sodium naphthalenide to generate decamethylsilicocene, naphthalene, and sodium chloride. Generation of the sterically crowded bis(pentamethylcyclopentadienyl)silicon(IV) dichloride required several steps, beginning with double deprotonation of (C_{5}Me_{4}H)_{2}SiCl_{2} using tert-butyllithium, followed by treatment of the resultant (C_{5}Me_{4}Li)_{2}SiCl_{2} with methyl iodide.

Decamethylsilicocene is soluble in aprotic solvents such as hexane, benzene, and chlorinated solvents. Molecular weight determinations show that decamethylsilicocene exists as a monomer in benzene. The ^{1}H NMR spectrum shows one sharp signal and the ^{13}C-{^{1}H} shows two signals one for the ring carbons and one for the methyl group carbons, consistent with the proposed averaged five-fold symmetric structure in solution and η^{5} coordination of the pentamethylcyclopentadienyl groups.

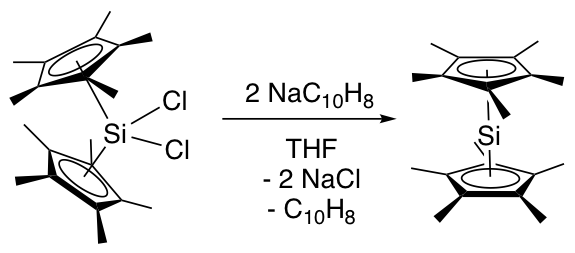
Original synthesis of decamethylsilicocene from Cp*_{2}SiCl_{2} and sodium naphthalenide

A recent synthesis directly forms decamethylsilicocene through salt metathesis from an N-heterocyclic carbene-stabilized silylene. This synthetic route avoids the synthesis of the bis(pentamethylcyclopentadienyl)silicon(IV) dichloride starting material. In this synthesis, the NHC-stabilized silylene (NHC=C[N−(C_{6}H_{3}–2,6–iPr_{2})CH]_{2}) was treated with the potassium salt of pentamethylcyclopentadiene at −30 °C (−22 °F), followed by extraction of decamethylsilicocene into hexane at −60 °C (−76 °F) to remove the NHC and KCl byproducts.

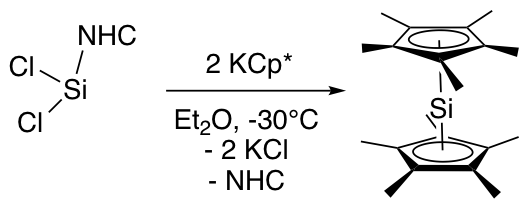
Synthetic route to decamethylsilicocene beginning from an NHC-stabilized silylene

== Structure and bonding ==
The x-ray crystallographically determined structure of decamethylsilicocene contains two isomers in a 2:1 ratio. The major isomer adopts a C_{s} geometry reminiscent of a bent metallocene, with the cyclopentadienyl planes forming an angle of about 25° and the methyl groups staggered. In this isomer, the lone pair on silicon is described as stereochemically active and the distance from the silicon atom to each Cp* centroid is 2.12 Å. The minor isomer adopts a D_{5d} geometry, the same as decamethylferrocene, with the cyclopentadienyl rings parallel to one another and the methyl groups staggered. The distance from the silicon atom to each Cp* centroid is 2.11 Å. The presence of two isomers is thought to be due to packing effects.

Computational studies carried out on the parent silicocene, (C_{5}H_{5})_{2}Si, reveal a very small (~4 kJ/mol) energetic change upon distorting the molecule from the D_{5d} geometry to either a C_{2v} (bent, hydrogen atoms eclipsed) or C_{s} (bent, hydrogen atoms staggered) geometry. A qualitative molecular orbital diagram predicts that the HOMO would have silicon(3s)-cyclopentadienyl antibonding character and the LUMO would have silicon(3p)-cyclopentadienyl antibonding character. NBO calculations are consistent with the predictions from a qualitative molecular orbital diagram, showing antibonding character between the silicon and the cyclopentadienyl ligands in both the HOMO and the LUMO. Calculated NBO valence orbital occupation numbers suggest that significant bonding occurs between the cyclopentadienyl ligands and the silicon 3s, 3px and 3py orbitals.

In comparison, the carbocene congener, silicon is calculated to bond more strongly to the cyclopentadienyl ligands due to the greater radial extension of the 3p orbitals compared to 2p orbitals. Additionally, the energetic separation between the 3s and 3p orbitals is greater than for the 2s and 2p orbitals, leading to less sp mizing which decreases the favorability of distortion to a silylene geometry in which each cyclopentadienyl ligand is bound η^{1} to the silicon atom. Atoms in molecules (AIM) calculations are consistent with this view. A plot of the Laplacian of the electron density between the central silicon atom and one cyclopentadienyl carbon shows less localization of the charge towards the central atom as compared to equivalent calculations for carbocene.

== Reactivity ==
Decamethylsilicocene reacts with aldehydes and ketones to give products with a silicon (IV) central atom and a carbon-carbon bond formed between two equivalents of the aldehyde or ketone. The two resultant alkoxides are coordinated to the silicon atom to form a five-membered ring. The coordination of the cyclopentadienyl ring changes from η^{5} to η^{1} over the course of these reactions

Similar changes in the hapticity of the pentamethylcyclopentadientyl rings occur when decamethylsilicocene reacts with carbon-nitrogen triples bonds. With organic cyanates and thiocyanates, carbon-carbon bond formation occurs and the resultant organic fragment is coordinated to the silicon atom through two anionic nitrogens. Decamethylsilicocene reacts with inorganic cyanides such as BrCN and (Me_{3}Si)CN through oxidative addition to form a silicon (IV) product with a cyanide ligand along with either a Br or Me_{3}Si ligand.

Decamethylsilicocene can be protonated using strong acids such as [HOEt_{2}][B(C_{6}F_{5})_{4}]. Upon protonation, one equivalent of pentamethylcyclopentadiene is eliminated to produce the pentamethylcyclopentadienylsilicon(II) cation with a [B(C_{6}F_{5})_{4}]^{−}.

The pentamethylcyclopentadienylsilicon(II) cation reacts with a variety of cyclopentadienyl salts to produce substituted silicocenes. Silicocene derivatives synthesized this way include (Me_{5}C_{5})((i-Pr)_{5}C_{5})Si, ((Me_{5}C_{5})(1,3,4-Me_{3}H_{2}C_{5})Si and (Me_{5}C_{5})(H_{5}C_{5})Si. The latter compound is stable at −50 °C (−58 °F) but begins to decompose at −30 °C (−22 °F). Additionally, the pentamethylcyclopentadienylsilicon(II) cation can react with metal precursors to generate complexes with metal-silicon multiple bonds.
