= Stannylene =

Class of organotin(II) compounds

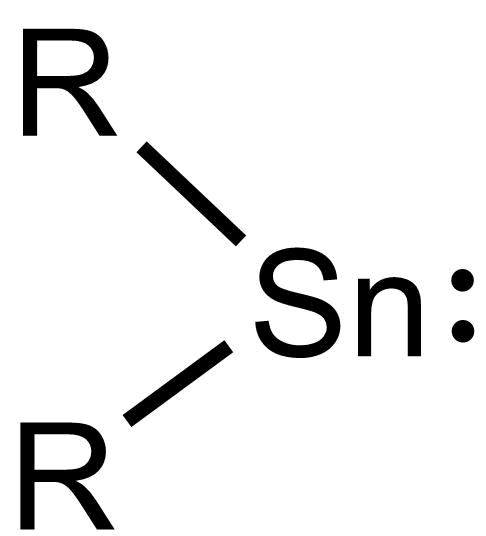
General structure of stannylene

Stannylenes (R_{2}Sn:) are a class of organotin(II) compounds that are analogues of carbene. Unlike carbene, which usually has a triplet ground state, stannylenes have a singlet ground state since valence orbitals of tin (Sn) have less tendency to form hybrid orbitals and thus the electrons in 5s orbital are still paired up. Free stannylenes are stabilized by steric protection. Adducts with Lewis bases are also known.

== History ==
The first persistent stannylene, [(Me_{3}Si)_{2}CH]_{2}Sn, was reported by Michael F. Lappert in 1973. Lappert used the same synthetic approach to synthesize the first diamidostannylene [(Me_{3}Si)_{2}N]_{2}Sn in 1974.

The short-lived, transient stannylene Me_{2}Sn has been generated by thermolysis of cyclo-(Me_{2}Sn)_{6}.

== Synthesis and characterization ==
=== Persistent stannylene ===
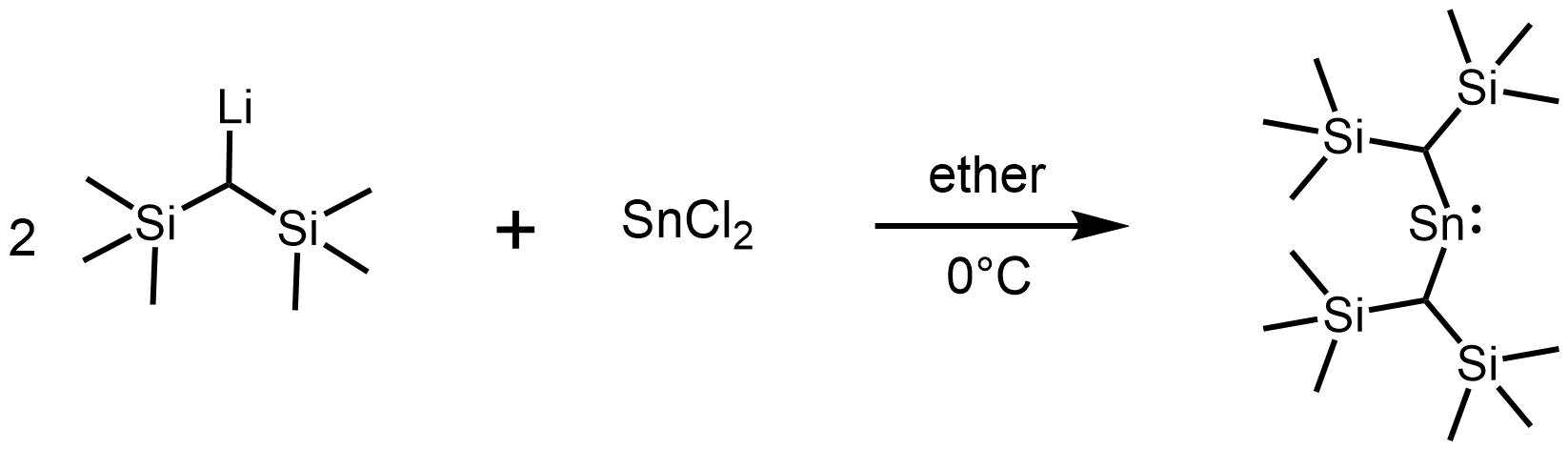
Most alkyl stannylenes have been synthesized by alkylation of tin(II) dihalides with organolithium reagents. For example, the first stannylene, [(Me_{3}Si)_{2}CH]_{2}Sn, was synthesized using (Me_{3}Si)_{2}CHLi and SnCl_{2}.

In some cases, stannylenes have been prepared by reduction of a tin(IV) compound by KC_{8}

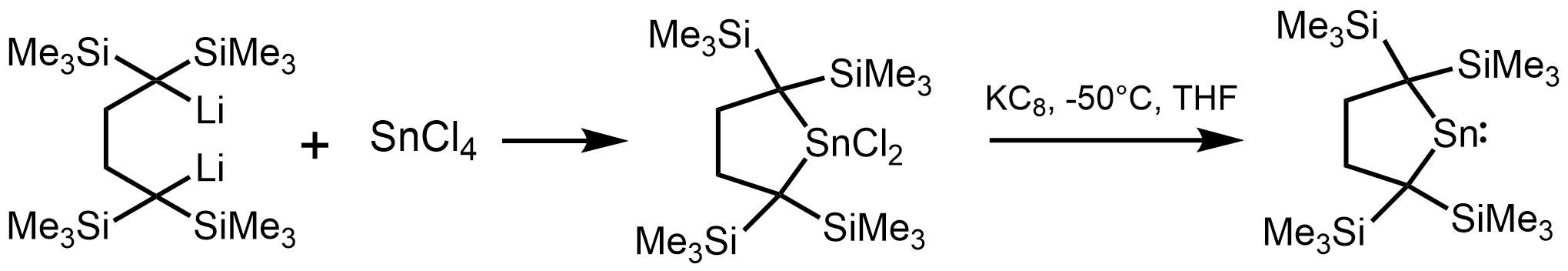

Amidostannylene can also be synthesized by using a tin(II) dihalide and the lithium amide.

=== Short-lived stannylene ===
The isolation of a transient alkyl stannylene is more difficult. The first isolation of dimethylstannylene was believed to be done by thermolysing cyclostannane (Me_{2}Sn)_{6}, which was the product of the condensation of Me_{2}Sn(NEt_{2})_{2} and Me_{2}SnH_{2}. The evidence came from the vibrational frequencies of dimethylstannylene identified by infrared spectroscopy, which is consistent with the calculated value. The existence of this elusive SnMe_{2} was further confirmed by the discovery of visible light absorption matching the calculated electronic transition of SnMe_{2} in gas phase.

Another method to prepare short-lived stannylene is laser flash photolysis using tetraalkyltin(IV) compound (e.g. SnMe_{4}) as a precursor. The generation of stannylene can be monitored by transient UV-VIS spectroscopy.

== Structure and bonding ==
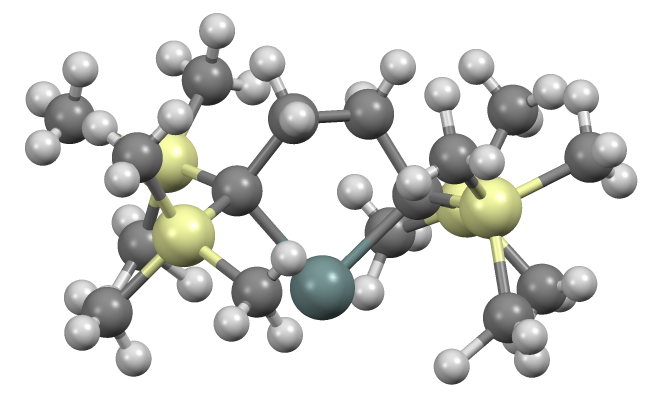
Structure of a stannylene from X-ray crystallography.

Stannylenes can be viewed as sp^{2}-hybridized with vacant 5p orbital and a lone pair. This gives rise to their red color from n to p transition.

With specific type of ligands, the electron deficiency of monomeric stannylene is reduced by the agostic interaction from B-H bond. This concept was proved by Mark Kenyon and coworkers in 2006 when they synthesized the cyclic dialkylstannylene [{n-Pr_{2}P(BH_{3})}(Me_{3}Si)CCH_{2}]_{2}Sn. The crystal structure of the synthesized compound showed the arrangement of one B-H bond toward the Sn atom with the B—H--Sn bond distance of 2.03 Å. The mitigation of Sn electron deficiency was proved by the spectroscopic data, especially the ^{119}Sn NMR spectra which showed the drastically low chemical shift (587 and 787 ppm comparing to 2323 ppm in analogous dialkylstannylene) indicating more electron density around Sn in this case.

== Reactivity ==
=== Oligomerization ===
Small, unstable stannylenes (e.g. dimethylstannylene) undergo self-oligomerization yielding cyclic oligostannanes, which can be used as stannylene sources.

More bulky stannylenes (e.g. Lappert's stannylene), on the other hand, tend to form a dimer. The nature of the Sn-Sn bond in stannylene dimer is rather different from C-C bond in carbene dimer (i.e. alkene). As alkene develops a typical double bond character and the molecule has a planar geometry, stannylene dimer has a trans-bent geometry. The double bond in stannylene dimer can be considered as two donor-acceptor interactions. The electron localization function (ELF) analysis of stannylene dimer shows a disynaptic basin (electrons in bonding orbitals) on both Sn atom, indicating that the interaction between two Sn atom is two unusual bent dative bonds. Apart from that, the stability of stannylene dimer is also affected by the steric repulsion and dispersion attraction between bulky substituents.

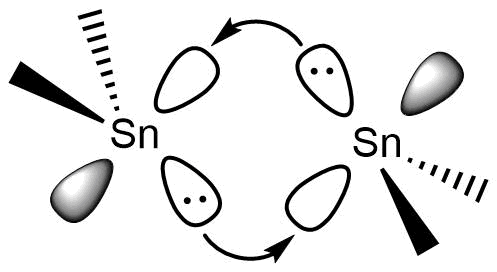
Double donor-acceptor interaction diagram in dimethylstannylene dimer

=== Insertion reaction ===
Alkylstannylenes can react with various reagents (e.g. alkyl halides, enones, dienes) in an oxidative addition (or insertion) fashion. The reaction between stannylene and 9,10-phenanthrolinedione produces an EPR signal that was identified to be 9,10-phenanthrenedione radical anion, indicating that this reaction proceeds via radical mechanism.

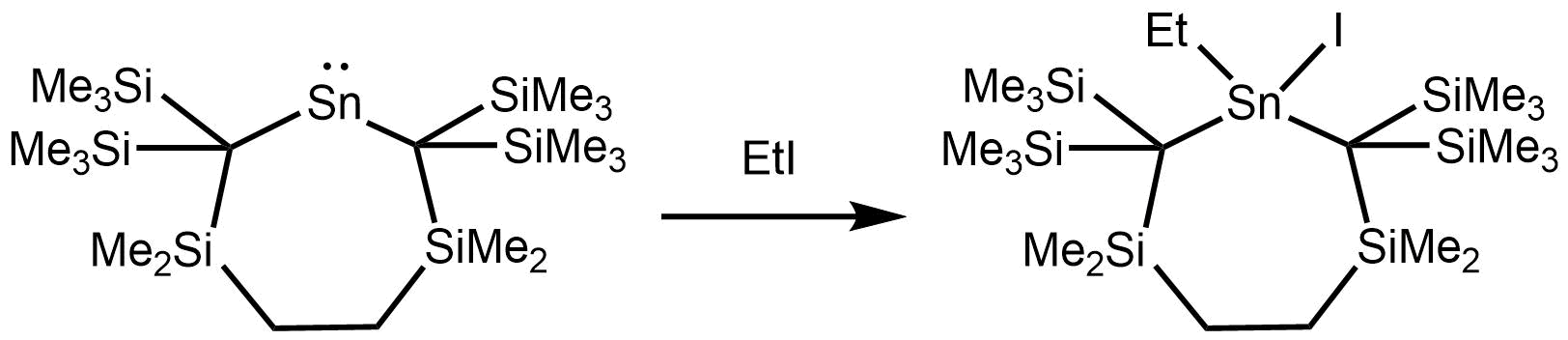
Oxidative addition of ethyl iodide to a stannylene.

=== Cycloaddition ===
Although stannylenes are more stable than its lighter carbene analogs, they readily undergo [2+4] cycloaddition reaction with Z-alkenes. The addition of (CH(SiMe_{3})_{2})_{2}Sn, to 2,7-diphenylocta-2,3,5,6-tetraene proceeds in a cheletropic fashion, as allowed by Woodward-Hoffmann rules.

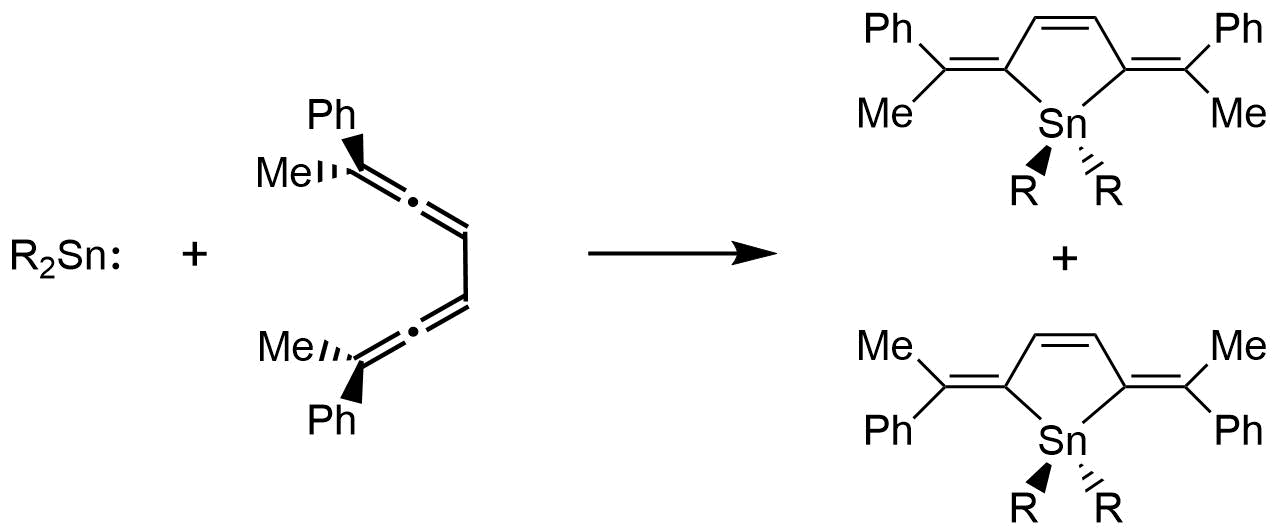
[2+4] Chelotropic cycloaddition of stannylene to 2,7-diphenylocta-2,3,5,6-tetraene in disrotatory fashion

=== Metal center for oxidative addition and reductive elimination ===
In terms of the Sn^{II}/Sn^{IV} couple, certain stannylenes resemble transition metals. The singlet-triplet energy separation is considered to have a strong effect on oxidative addition reactivity, by utilizing a very strong σ-donor boryl (-BX_{2}) ligand. The results demonstrated that not only molecular hydrogen but also E-H bond (E = B, Si, O, N) can be oxidative added on Sn. In ammonia and water cases, the oxidative added product could also undergo reductive elimination, yielding O- or N-B bond formation.

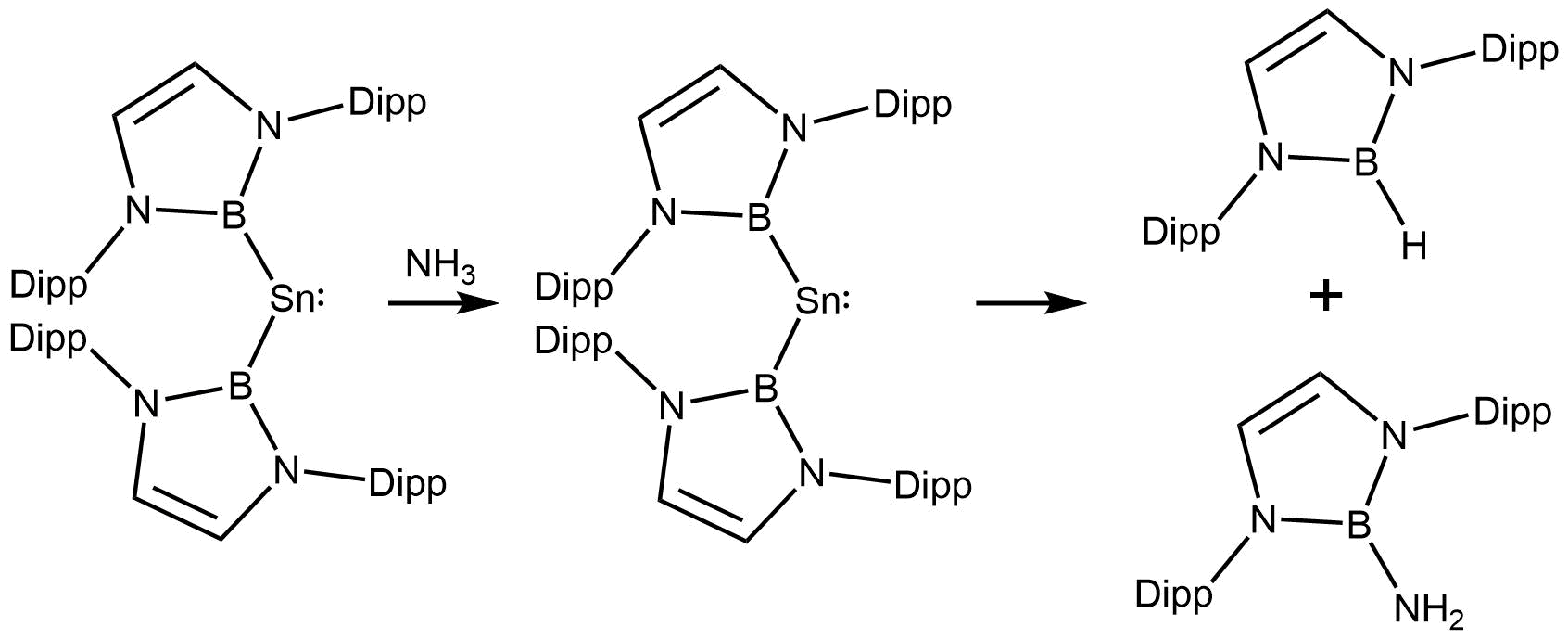
The oxidative addition of ammonia on Sn center and subsequent reductive elimination to yield B-N bond. (Dipp = 2,6-C_{6}H_{3}iPr_{2})

== See also ==
- Carbene analogs
- Silylene
