= Germanium iodides =

Germanium iodides are inorganic compounds with the formula GeI_{x}. Two such compounds exist: germanium(II) iodide, GeI_{2}, and germanium(IV) iodide GeI_{4}.

Germanium(II) iodide is an orange-yellow crystalline solid which decomposes on melting. Its specific density is 5.37 and it can be sublimed at 240 °C in a vacuum. It can be prepared by reducing germanium(IV) iodide with aqueous hypophosphorous acid in the presence of hydroiodic acid. It is oxidised by a solution of potassium iodide in hydrochloric acid to germanium(IV) iodide. It reacts with acetylene at 140 °C to form an analogue of cyclohexa-1,4-diene in which the methylene groups, CH_{2}, are replaced with diiodogermylene groups, GeI_{2}.

Germanium(IV) iodide is an orange-red crystalline solid with melting point 144 °C and boiling point 440 °C (with decomposition). Its specific density is 4.32. It is soluble in non-polar solvents like carbon disulfide, chloroform or benzene, but hydrolyses readily.

Mixed anion compound germanide iodides are also known.
