= Silylene =

generic silylene
- Simplest silylene has R=Hydrogen

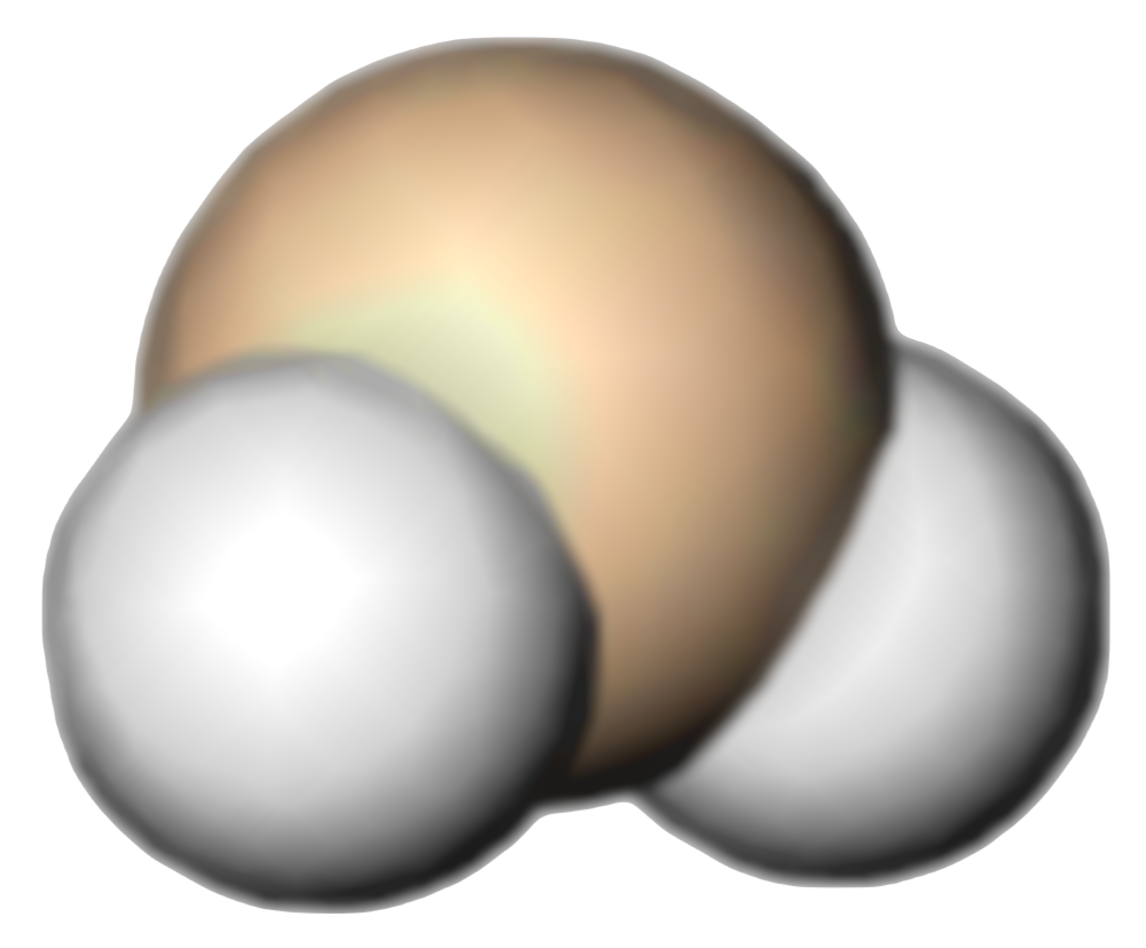

Names
- IUPAC name Silylene
- Systematic IUPAC name Silylidene
- Other names Hydrogen silicide(−II); Silicene

Identifiers
CAS Number	13825-90-6
3D model (JSmol)	Interactive image
ChemSpider	4885758
PubChem CID	6327230
CompTox Dashboard (EPA)	DTXSID70884652
- InChI: InChI=1S/H2Si/h1H2 Key: XMIJDTGORVPYLW-UHFFFAOYSA-N
- SMILES: [SiH2]

Properties
Chemical formula	H_{2}Si
Molar mass	30.101 g·mol^{−1}
- Except where otherwise noted, data are given for materials in their standard state (at 25 °C [77 °F], 100 kPa). verify (what is ?) Infobox references

Silylene is a chemical compound with the formula SiR_{2} (R = H). It is the silicon analog of carbene. Silylenes decomposes rapidly when condensed.

Silylenes are formal derivatives of silylene with its hydrogens replaced by other substituents. Most examples feature amido (NR_{2}) or organyl groups.

Silylenes have been proposed as reactive intermediates. They are carbene analogs.

== Synthesis and properties ==
Silylenes have been generated by thermolysis or photolysis of polysilanes, by silicon atom reactions (insertion, addition or abstraction), by pyrolysis of silanes, or by reduction of 1,1-dihalosilane. It has long been assumed that the conversion of metallic Si to tetravalent silicon compounds proceeds via silylene intermediates:

Si + Cl_{2} → SiCl_{2}
SiCl_{2} + Cl_{2} → SiCl_{4}

Similar considerations apply to the direct process, the reaction of methyl chloride and bulk silicon.

Early observations of silylenes involved generation of dimethylsilylene by dechlorination of dimethyldichlorosilane:

SiCl_{2}(CH_{3})_{2} + 2 K → Si(CH_{3})_{2} + 2 KCl

The formation of dimethylsilylene was demonstrated by conducting the dechlorination in the presence of trimethylsilane: the trapped product being pentamethyldisilane:

Si(CH_{3})_{2} + HSi(CH_{3})_{3} → (CH_{3})_{2}Si(H)−Si(CH_{3})_{3}

A room-temperature isolable N-heterocyclic silylene is N,N′-di-tert-butyl-1,3-diaza-2-silacyclopent-4-en-2-ylidene:

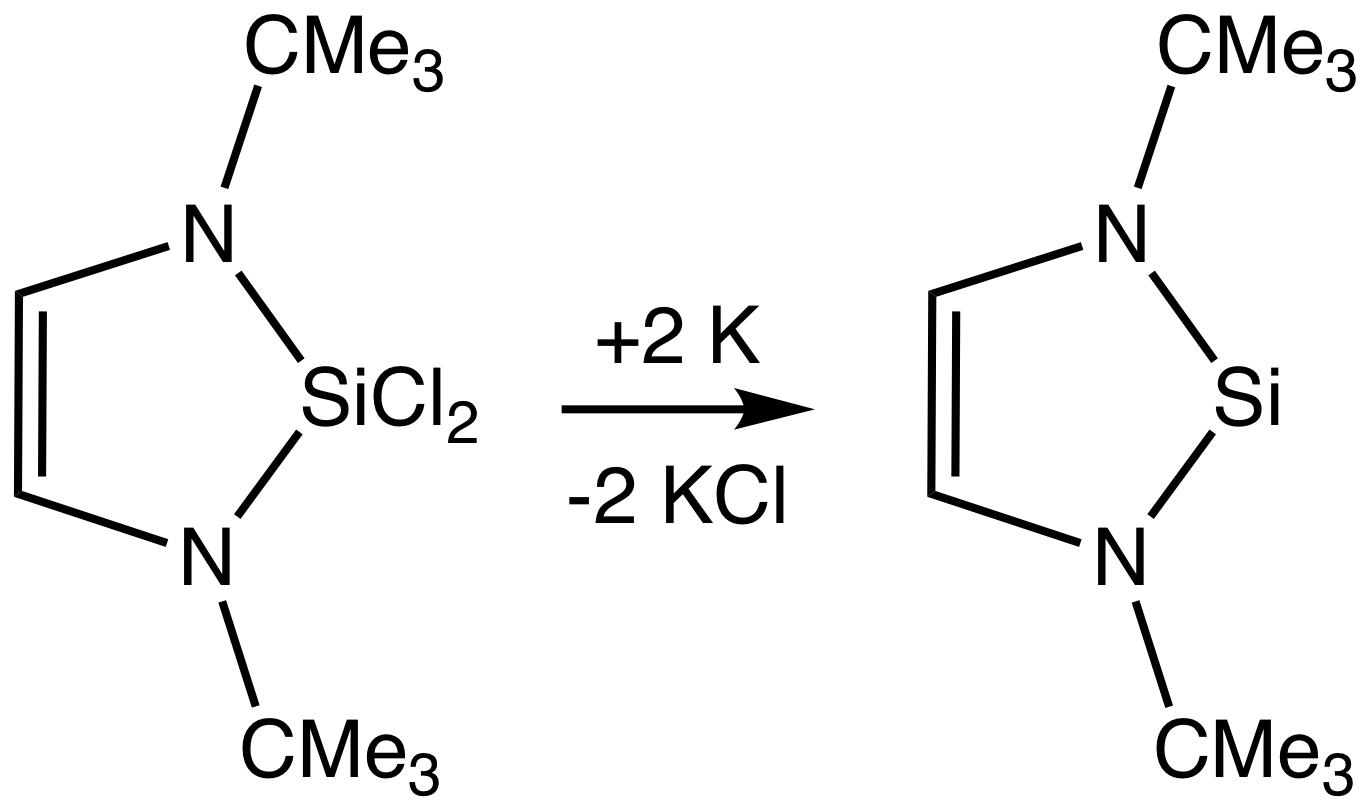
Synthesis of an isolable silylene.

The α-amido centers stabilize silylenes by π-donation. The dehalogenation of diorganosilicon dihalides is a widely exploited.

== Related reactions ==
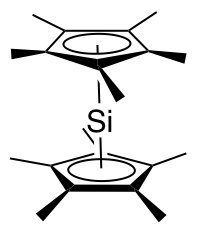
Decamethylsilicocene is an example of a silylene.

In one study diphenylsilylene is generated by flash photolysis of a trisilane:

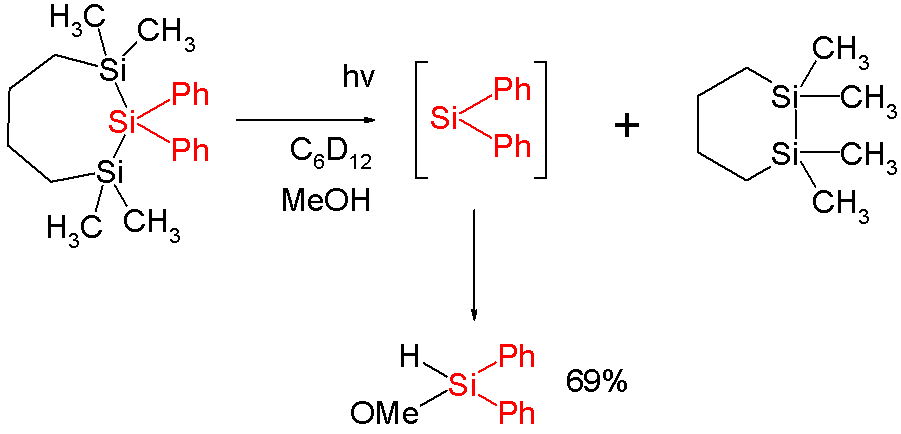

In this reaction diphenylsilylene is extruded from the trisila ring. The silylene can be observed with UV spectroscopy at 520 nm and is short-lived with a chemical half-life of two microseconds. Added methanol acts as a chemical trap with a second order rate constant of 1.3×10^{10} mol^{−1} s^{−1} which is close to diffusion control.

== See also ==
- Carbene analogs
- N-heterocyclic silylene
- Silenes, R_{2}Si=SiR_{2}
- Silylium ions, protonated silylenes
