= Ogundele =

Nigerian given name

- Gender: Male
- Language: Yoruba

Origin
- Origin: Nigeria
- Meaning: Ògún has arrived home.
- Region of origin: South West, Nigeria

Ogundele audio is a Nigerian male given name and surname of Yoruba origin.

== Notable individuals with the name ==
- Sijibomi Ogundele, Nigerian real estate entrepreneur
- DIPP (Oladipupo Ogundele), Nigerian singer-songwriter
- Elijah Abina, Nigerian pastor born Elijah Ogundele Abina
