= Dipp =

Dipp may refer to:

== People ==
- DIPP (born 1980), Nigerian singer-songwriter
- Hugo Tolentino Dipp (1930–2019), Dominican historian and politician
- Sergio Dipp (born 1988), Mexican sports broadcaster

== Chemistry ==
- 2,6-Diisopropylphenyl group

== Other ==
- Department of Industrial Policy and Promotion
- Devaux's Index of Project Performance
