= Dimetallene =

Chemical compounds with metal to metal double bonds

In organometallic chemistry, a dimetallene is a chemical compound in which two metal or metalloid atoms, particularly the heavy carbon group elements, participate in a covalent double bond. A related class of chemicals are dimetallynes, which have covalent triple bonds.

Dimetallenes and dimetallynes are typically very reactive. Most stable dimetallenes rely on steric effects from bulky substituents near the multiple bond to prevent oligomerisation or rearrangement.

Because of their reactivity and difficulty of preparation, these compounds are chiefly of interest in basic research and have no major applications in the chemical industry.

== Naming ==
The preferred IUPAC names for heavier alkene analogues are derived from alkane analogues in the same way that alkenes are. Compounds with silicon-silicon single bonds are silanes, so compounds with silicon-silicon double bonds are silenes. However, the name "silene" is commonly used in organosilicon chemistry to refer to compounds with C=Si bonds. In this context, compounds with Si=Si bonds are called "disilenes".

== Types ==
=== Carbon group dimetallenes ===
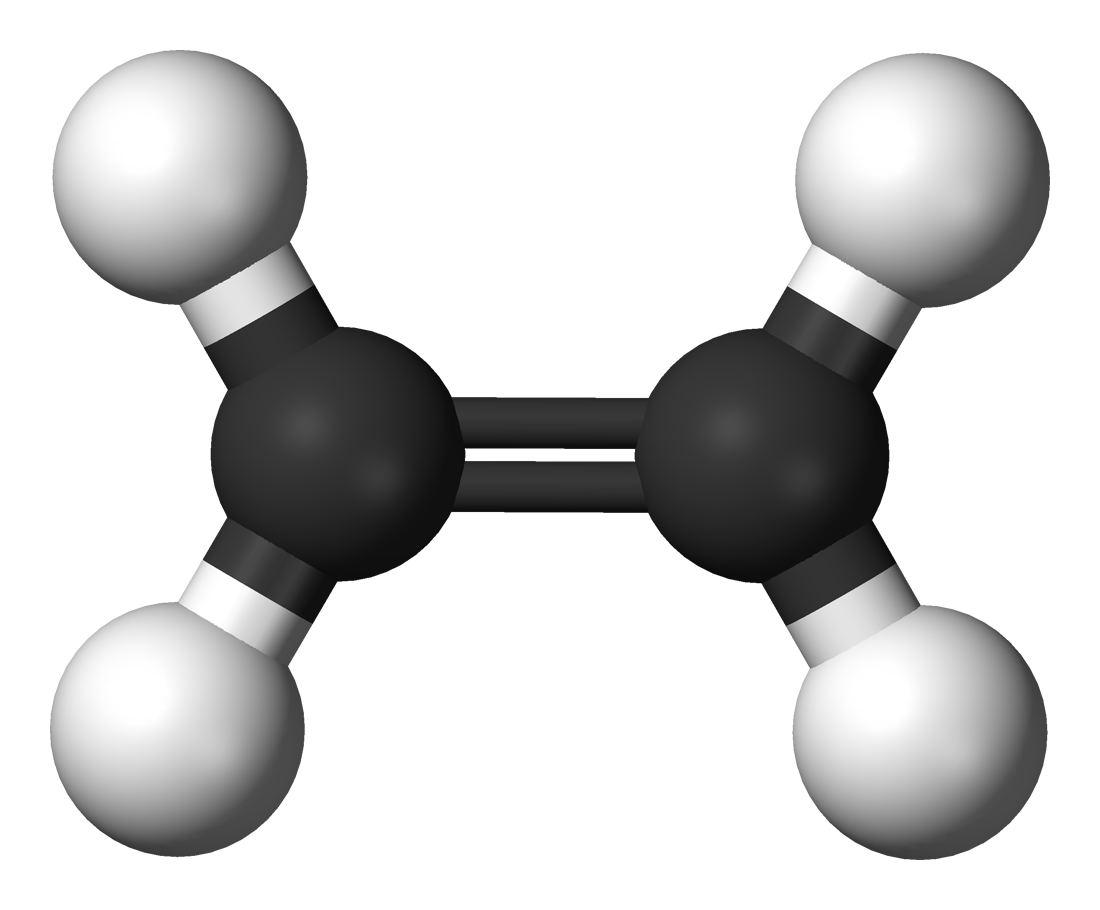
Planar geometry of ethylene, C_{2}H_{4}.

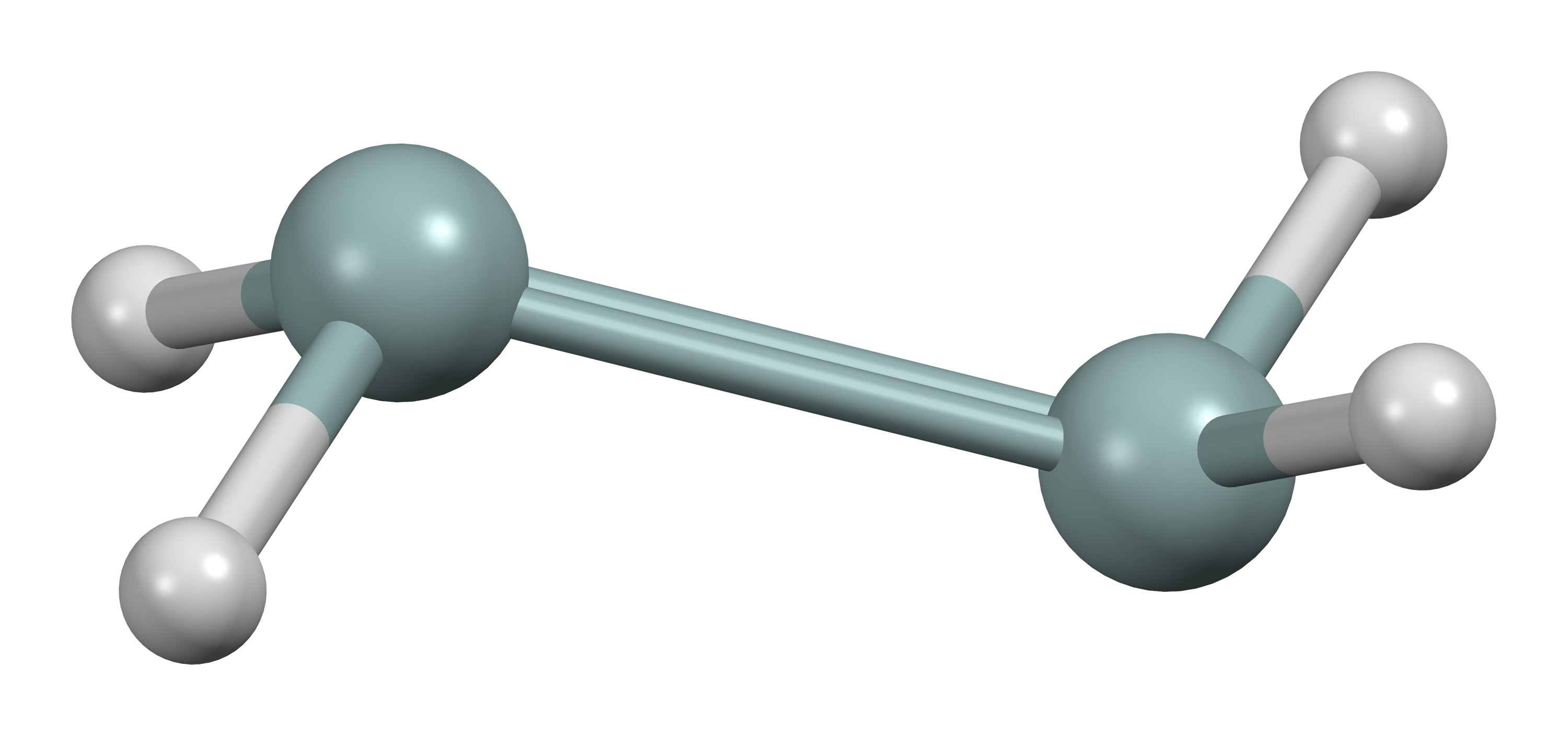
trans-bent geometry of disilene, Si_{2}H_{4}.

Dimetallenes of carbon group elements are direct analogues of alkenes in their chemical formula, but differ in their bond angles and molecular structure. Where alkenes and alkynes adopt trigonal planar and linear geometries respectively, their heavier analogues are instead heavily trans-bent.

Prior to the 1970s, chemists had not observed any stable compounds of this class, and they were thought to be mostly forbidden by the double bond rule. The first dimetallenes of germanium and tin were discovered in 1976, with dimetallenes and dimetallynes of all carbon group elements known by 2002.

=== Boron group dimetallenes ===
The electropositivity of boron makes B=B bonds extremely rare. Dimetallenes and dimetallynes of boron and aluminium must be stabilised by Lewis basic ligands, typically N-heterocyclic carbenes, to stabilise the double bond by filling empty orbitals on the metal atoms. Unligated double bonds from heavier elements can be prepared by taking advantage of steric effects from large m-terphenyl ligands.

With the production of a substituted dialumene in 2017, metallenes have been synthesised for all boron group elements. Presence of double-bond character was verified by [2+2] cycloaddition with ethylene.

=== Nitrogen group dimetallenes (pnictenes) ===
The N=N bond is a common functional group in organic chemistry. The simplest such compound is diimide, and its derivatives are azo compounds. Preparation of a phosphorus analogue of azobenzene was first claimed in 1877, but this was later shown to be a cyclic dimer (PhP)_{4}. The first true diphosphene, dimesityl diphosphene, was prepared in 1981. This was shortly followed by the first diarsene in 1983, but preparation of distibenes and dibisthmuthenes proved more elusive. Development of bulkier terphenyl substituents allowed isolation of these compounds in the 1990s.

== Potential applications ==
Some dimetallenes have similar activation capabilities to transition metal complexes, allowing them to potentially replace scarce or toxic transition metal catalysts. Demonstration of these reactions has been limited to small molecules at laboratory scale, without consideration of the catalyst regeneration necessary for practical industrial use.

As of 2020, only two dimetallene or dimetallyne-based catalytic cycles had been demonstrated: the trimerisation of terminal alkynes using a digermyne, and the reduction of carbon dioxide using a dialumene.

== See also ==
- Group 13/15 multiple bonds
