= 2,6-Diisopropylphenyl group =

The 2,6-diisopropylphenyl group, abbreviated Dipp, is an aromatic functional group in organic chemistry. The chemical formula can be written C_{6}H_{3}((CH_{3})_{2}CH)_{2}−, but it is frequently shortened to C_{6}H_{3}iPr_{2}−, similarly to the use of C_{6}H_{2}Me_{3}− for mesityl. It offers considerable steric bulk, making it of interest for researching unstable compounds and designing ligands in organometallic chemistry.

== Preparation ==
Preparation of 2,6-diisopropylphenyl compounds from 1,3-diisopropylbenzene is impractical. Steric hindrance from the isopropyl substitutents means aromatic substitution reactions will primarily produce 1,3,5-substituted benzenes (3,5-diisopropylphenyl in functional group nomenclature).

A major source of diisopropylphenyl substituents is 2,6-diisopropylaniline. Diisopropyl compounds may also be prepared from halobenzene derivatives such as 2,6-diisopropylbromobenzene.

== Applications ==
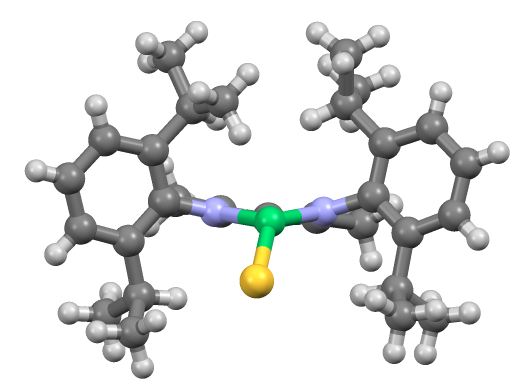
Diisopropylphenyl substituents make up most of this NacNac ligand.

The diisopropylphenyl structure consists of alkane-substituted benzene, so it is not very chemically reactive. It serves instead to provide steric hindrance, limiting reactions of other nearby functional groups.

The diisopropylphenyl structure is found in many ligands calling for steric bulk. NacNac ligands can be prepared from 2,6-diisopropylaniline. Terphenyl ligands featuring two diisopropylphenyl substituents, systematically bis(diisopropylphenyl)phenyl, are capable of stabilising high-bond order compounds such as dimetallenes. The first stable digermyne was prepared using DIPP-based terphenyl ligands. Persistent carbenes containing 2,6-diisopropylphenyl substituents are sterically demanding Lewis bases, and can be used as chelating agents to stabilise diborenes.
