= Digermyne =

Class of chemical compounds

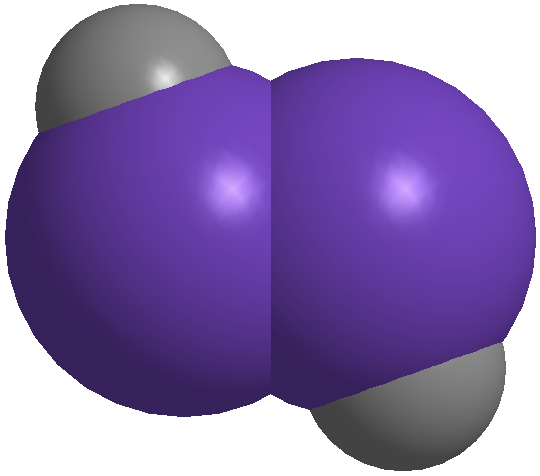
HGeGeH

Digermynes are a class of compounds that are regarded as the heavier digermanium analogues of alkynes. The parent member of this entire class is H-Ge≡Ge-H, which has only been characterized computationally, but has revealed key features of the whole class. Because of the large interatomic repulsion between two Ge atoms, only kinetically stabilized digermyne molecules can be synthesized and characterized by utilizing bulky protecting groups and appropriate synthetic methods, for example, reductive coupling of germanium(II) halides.

The bonding between two Ge atoms in digermyne is different from C≡C bond in alkynes, which results in the trans-bent structure of digermyne. Trans-bent structure is quite common in heavier Group 14 element analogues of alkynes. The second order Jahn-Teller (SOJT) effect of digermynes gives rise to slipped π-bond and large molecular geometrical distortion.

Because of the multibonded feature of digermynes and the large interatomic repulsion of two Ge atoms, which therefore leads to the long germanium-germanium distance, digermynes are very reactive and can undergo different kinds of reactions, such as [2+1] and [2+2] cycloaddition reaction with different kinds of unsaturated molecules, [4+1] cycloaddition with 1,3-dimethyl-1,3-butadiene, addition reaction of alcohols and water, and act as π-electron donor to undergo coordination reaction with silver ion.

== Preparation ==
Although many computational studies have calculated the structures and energies of the parent molecule HGeGeH and digermynes with organic substitutes, they can be only synthesized and isolated upon the protection of bulky R groups. It has been proven that the synthetic strategy that reducing proper precursor, usually germanium(II) halides with bulky protection groups, by strong reductants is powerful for synthesizing digermynes.

=== Reductive coupling of germanium(II) halides ===
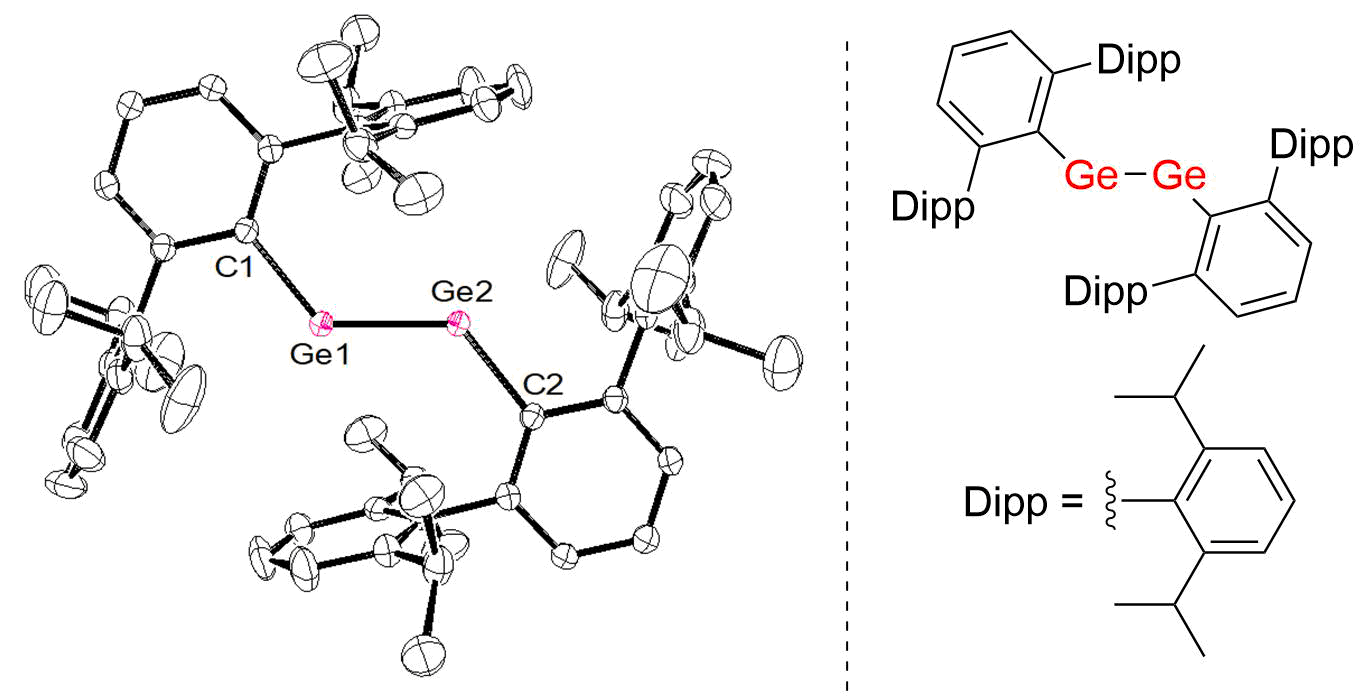
The crystal structure of Ar^{1}GeGeAr^{1}.

The first stable digermyne 2,6-Dipp_{2}H_{3}C_{6}GeGeC_{6}H_{3}-2,6-Dipp_{2} (Ar^{1}GeGeAr^{1}, Dipp = 2,6-diisopropylphenyl) was synthesized and characterized by Philip P. Power and co-workers in 2002. Reductive coupling of bulky 2,6-Dipp_{2}-C_{6}H_{3} (Ar^{1}) group protected Ge(II) monochloride (Ge(Cl)Ar^{1}) under the treatment of potassium in tetrahydrofuran (THF) or benzene gave the formation of Ar^{1}GeGeAr^{1}. The core structure C1-Ge1-Ge2-C2 has a centrosymmetric trans-bent feature, with the C1-Ge1-Ge2 angle of 128.67(8)° and a considerably short distance of 2.2850(6) Å between two Ge atoms. It has a good conjugation between two terphenyl rings and C1-Ge1-Ge2-C2 plain because of the nearly zero torsion angle (0.4°) presented. Similar molecule, designated Ar^{2}GeGeAr^{2} has been calculated before the characterization of Ar^{1}GeGeAr^{1}, with the optimized trans-bent core structure protected by even more crowded 2,6-Trip_{2}C_{6}H_{2} (Ar^{2}, Trip = 2,4,6-triisopropylphenyl) groups. The trans bending in Ar^{2}GeGeAr^{2} (123.2°) is comparable with Ar^{1}GeGeAr^{1}, and the Ge-Ge distance of 2.277 Å also differs little from that of Ar^{1}GeGeAr^{1}. Ar^{2}GeGeAr^{2} was obtained using the same reduction method and afforded the structure similar to the calculated one and Ar^{1}GeGeAr^{1}.

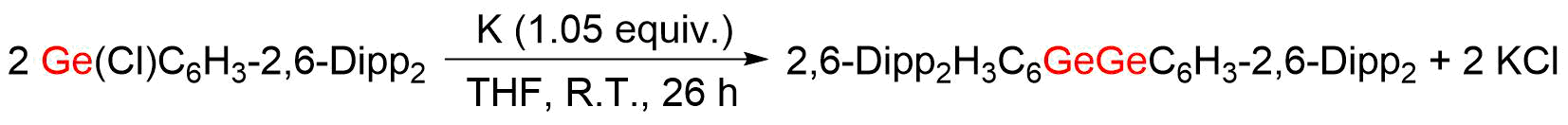
The synthesis of digermyne 2,6-Dipp_{2}H_{3}C_{6}GeGeC_{6}H_{3}-2,6-Dipp_{2} (Ar^{1}GeGeAr^{1})

Similar synthetic method was used to facilitate the synthesis of a digermyne LGeGeL with a Ge-Ge single bond. Instead of taking advantage of bulky ligands with carbon as coordinating atom, nitrogen-based protecting group L (L = N(Si(CH_{3})_{3})(Ar^{3})) was used. The bond angles of N-Ge-Ge are 100.09(6)°, which are much more distorted than Ar^{1}GeGeAr^{1} and Ar^{2}GeGeAr^{2}.

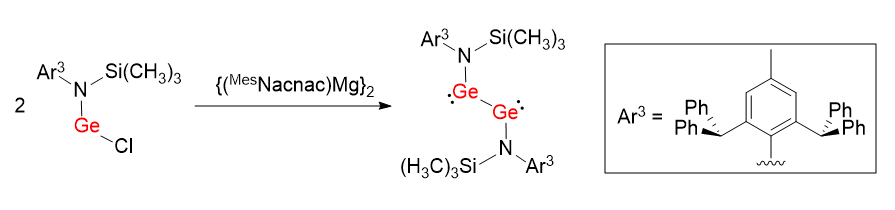
The synthesis of LGeGeL.

=== Reduction of digermylene ===
Sterically crowded trans-dibromodigermylene, which is protected by 2,6-bis[bis(trimethylsilyl)methyl]-4-[tris(trimethylsilyl)methyl]phenyl (Bbt) groups, can be reduced by two equivalent of potassium graphite (KC_{8}) in benzene at room temperature to give the birth to corresponding digermyne BbtGe≡GeBbt.

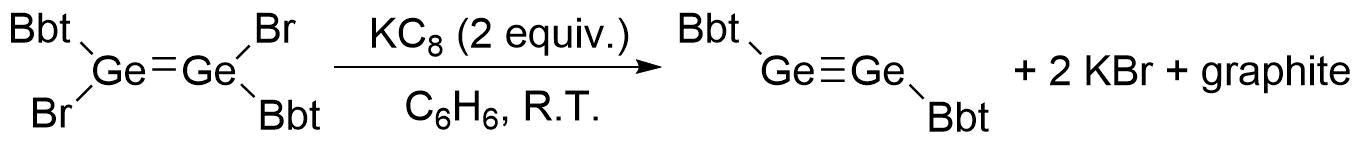
The synthesis of BbtGeGeBbt.

== Bonding ==
=== Valence bond models ===
The most obvious difference between alkynes and digermynes, and also other heavier alkyne analogues, is the molecular geometry, which is linear in alkynes, but trans-bent in all heavier alkyne analogues. This huge difference in molecular geometry is resulted from the difference between carbon-carbon triple bond and the bonding of two group 14 heavier atoms, for example germanium atoms. Heavier group 14 elements have much larger covalent radii than carbon. For example, the single and triple bond radii of carbon are 75 Å and 60 Å respectively, while the single and triple bond radii of germanium are 121 Å and 114 Å respectively, which are approximately 50% longer. The triple-bond system REER of group 14 elements can be viewed as the interaction between either two quartet ER fragments or two doublet ER fragments. The former case corresponds to the planar structure, while the latter one represents the trans-bent structure. The quartet ER fragments are lower in energy than doublet one only when E is carbon, which is to say for heavier group 14 elements, the trans-bent structure is more energetically favored than planar structure. For example, HGe and PhGe fragments of HGeGeH and PhGeGePh are 44.2 and 44.1 kcal/mol more stable in energy than the quartet states respectively, under the calculation level of B3PW91/6-311+G(2df) (for Ge), 6-31G(d) (for C, H). The criterion of a trans-bent structure can be given by CGMT model. Therefore, the bonding between two Ge atoms in digermynes can be described as donor-acceptor interactions using valence bond models.

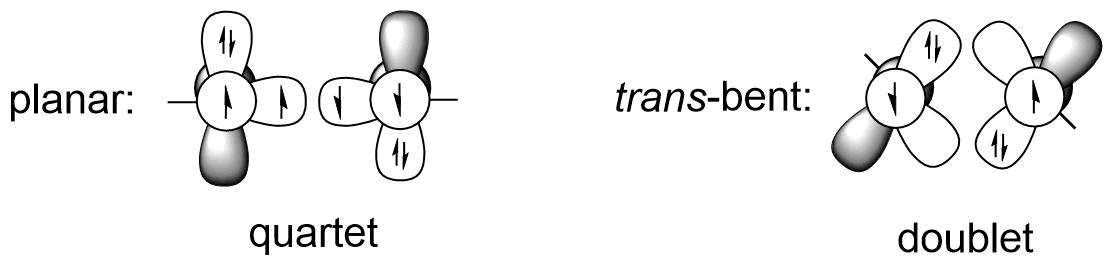
The quartet and doublet structure of RGe fragments

It can be seen from the bonding representations that Ge atoms are either linked by one σ-bond and two donor-acceptor bonds (from a filled sp hybrid orbital to an empty p orbital) or one σ-bond and one π-bond with a resonating lone pair or two radicals on each Ge atoms. According to the resonance structures, one of the two Ge atoms bears partial positive charge and is electron deficient, the other Ge atom has an electron lone pair and is able to donate some electron density.

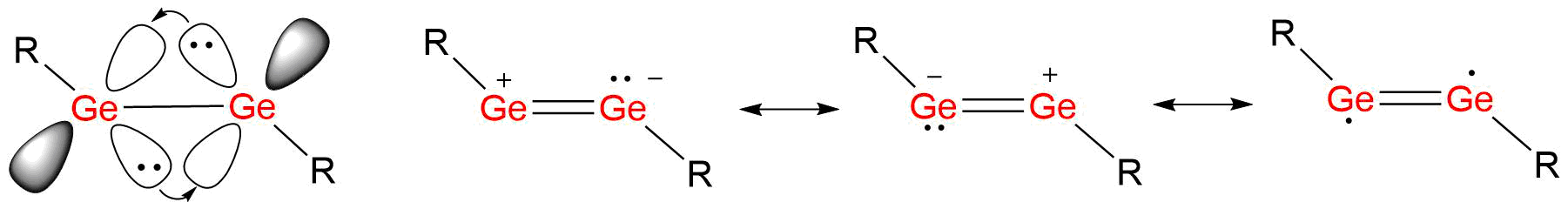
Donor-acceptor bonds and resonance structures of digermynes

The abnormal bond angles and the single-bond feature of LGeGeL can be rationalized by the electron donating character of N atom, which leads to the formation of N p(π)→Ge (empty p orbital) interaction. Therefore, the donor-acceptor bonds between two Ge atoms are weakened and are more like non-bonding electron lone pairs. It has been suggested that the bond order of Ge-Ge bond is to some degree affected by the electronic properties of bulky protecting groups.

=== Molecular orbital (MO) treatment ===
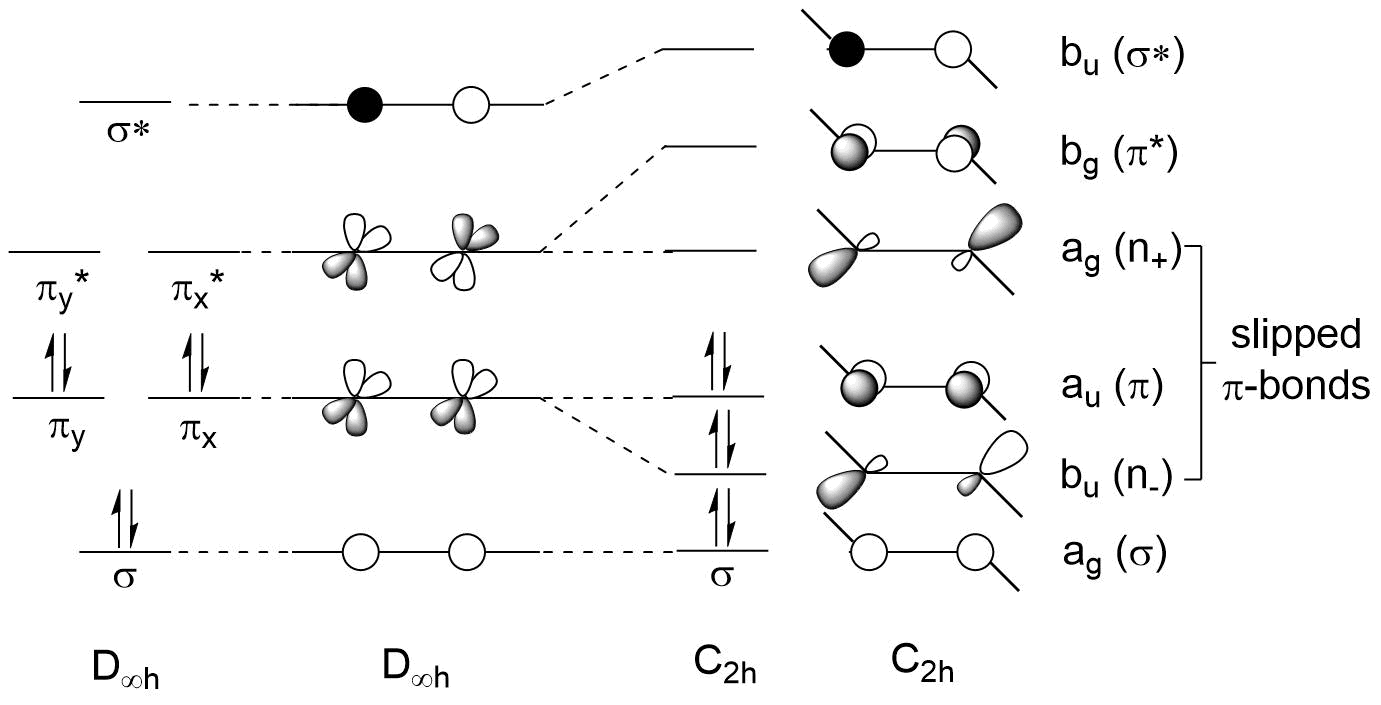
Second order Jahn-Teller effect of the bonding between two Ge atoms in digermynes leads to the geometrical distortion of digermynes.

In a molecular orbital (MO) description, the geometrical distortion (trans-bent structure) of digermynes is the consequence of the second order Jahn-Teller (SOJT) effect, which is the symmetry allowed interaction between filled bonding MO (generally the HOMO in digermynes) and empty nonbonding or antibonding MOs (usually the latter one) that are close in energy and can lead to large molecular distortion. If constraining the digermyne molecule in D_{∞h} point group, two Ge atoms will form one low-lying σ-bonding orbital, two degenerate π-bonding orbitals and π-antibonding orbitals, and one high-lying σ-antibonding orbital, which are the same as alkynes. SOJT mixing of in-plain π-bonding orbital (π_{x}, HOMO) and σ-antibonding orbital, which have the same b_{u} symmetry in the trans-bent C_{2h} point group, give rise to a slipped π-bond with significant non-bonded electron lone pair character which is lower in energy, as well as a σ-antibonding orbital with higher energy. This second order mixing of MOs leads to the molecular distortion in geometry from linear D_{∞h} to trans-bent C_{2h}. The mixing of σ-bonding orbital and in-plain π-antibonding orbital (π_{x}^{*}, LUMO) is also symmetrically (both are in b_{g} symmetry) and energetically allowed. Noticing that large SOJT effect occurs between two orbitals with energy difference of 2 eV or even larger, for example, 4 eV, the extent of mixing of orbitals is neglectable in alkynes, but is maximized in heavier elements, like Ge atoms in digermynes.

== Reactivity ==
=== Cycloaddition ===
Because of the multibonded feature of digermynes and the large interatomic repulsion of two Ge atoms, digermynes can undergo cycloaddition reactions with alkenes and alkynes, such as ethylene and acetylene.

==== [2+1] and [2+2] Cycloaddition ====
Digermynes are able to react with a variety of unsaturated small molecules, including alkynes, alkenes, PhN=NPh, isocyanides, and azides, due to their relatively weak Ge-Ge bonds. It has been proven that there are two types of reaction modes when BbtGeGeBbt is treated with ethylene, which both undergo a [1+2] cycloaddition reaction at first to afford a germirane-substituted germylene intermediate. Ge atom of the germirane substituent then easily inserts into one of the Ge-C bonds of germylene to generate 1,2-digermacyclobutene, which has been illustrated both experimentally and computationally. In the case that the pressure of ethylene is about 1 atm, the 1,2-digermacyclobutene further reacts with one equivalent of ethylene through the same cycloaddition reaction to afford a digermane with two four-membered Ge_{2}C_{2} rings, while the digermane with two three-membered GeC_{2} rings is obtained with higher pressure of ethylene. It has been suggested that the former one is thermodynamically stable product, whereas the latter one is only kinetically stable.

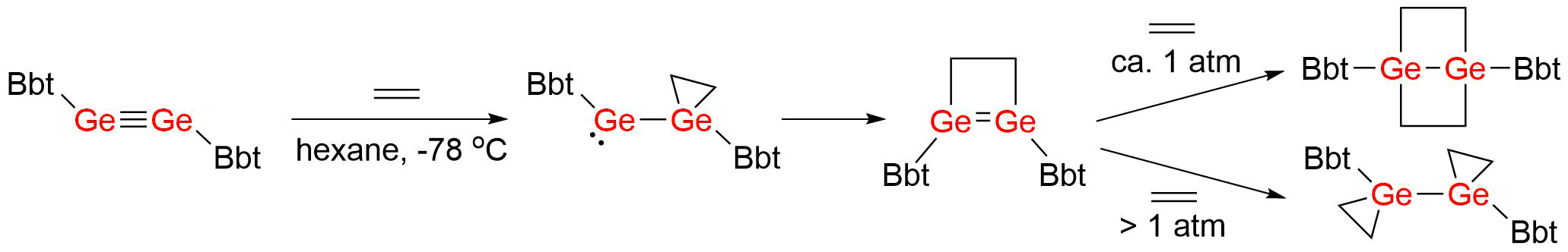
The reaction between BbtGeGeBbt and ethylene.

Similarly, [2+2] cycloaddition reactions take place between digermynes and alkynes, for example PhC≡CPh, leading to the formation of 1,2-digermacyclobutadiene.

==== [4+1] Cycloaddition: diradical character of digermynes ====
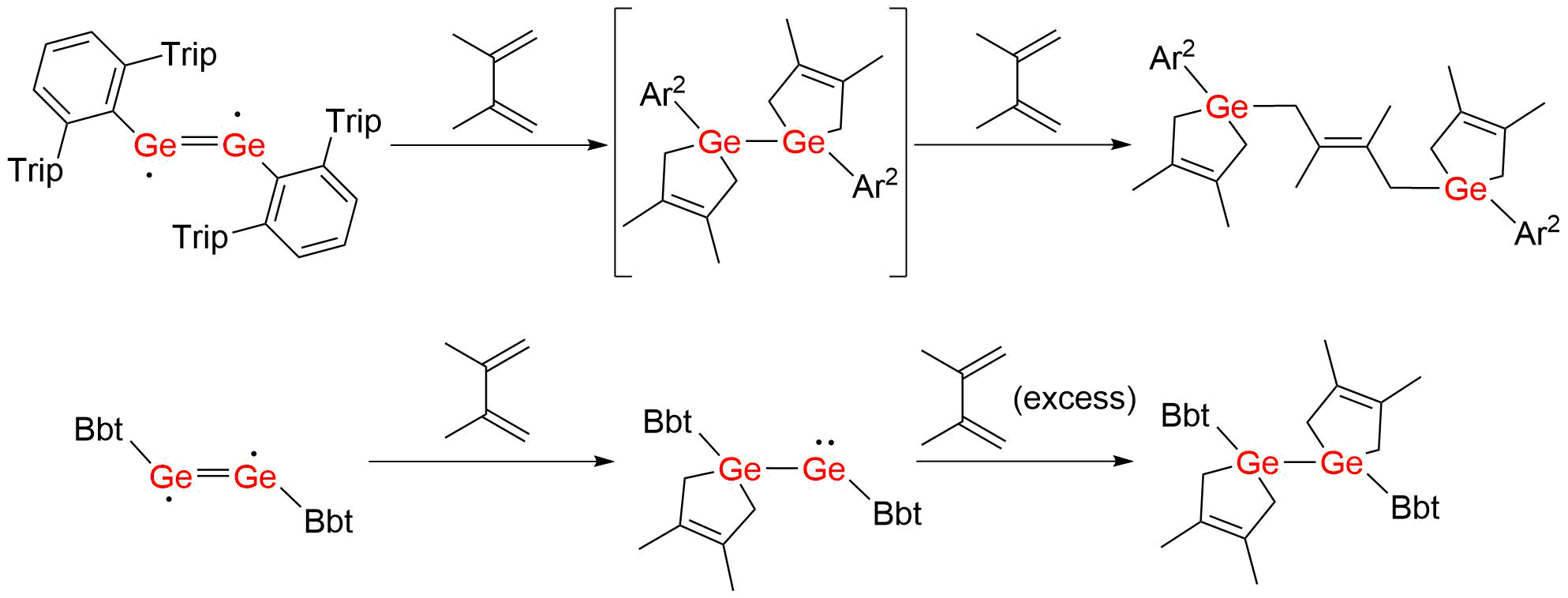
[4+1] cycloaddition reaction of Ar^{2}GeGeAr^{2} with 1,3-dimethyl-1,3-butadiene.

Different from alkynes which undergo [4+2] cycloaddition reaction with 2,3-dimethyl-1,3-butadiene to give 1,4-cyclohexadiene derivatives, digermynes undergo [4+1] cycloaddition reaction because of the presence of the exceedingly reactive diradical character, which can be seen in valence orbital models. In the case of Ar^{2}GeGeAr^{2}, it reacts with 2,3-dimethyl-1,3-butadiene to afford unusual germane derivative. The reaction begins between each of the radical center and 2,3-dimethyl-1,3-butadiene first, which give rise to the formation of digermane with two germacyclopent-3-ene rings through [4+1] cycloaddition. The increased steric repulsion of two GeC_{4} rings leads to the homolytic cleavage of the Ge-Ge single bond which then produces the final germane by 1,4-addition reaction with additional equivalent of the 2,3-dimethyl-1,3-butadiene. The breaking of the Ge-Ge bond is not seen when BbtGeGeBbt reacts with 2,3-dimethyl-1,3-butadiene, which only gives rise to digermane.

=== Addition reaction of alcohols and water: multiple-bond character of digermynes ===
BbtGeGeBbt has been proven to be able to undergo addition reaction with alcohols such as methanol and water to generate 1,1-dimethoxydigermane and 1,1-dihydroxydigermane, respectively, which demonstrate the multiple-bond character of digermynes.

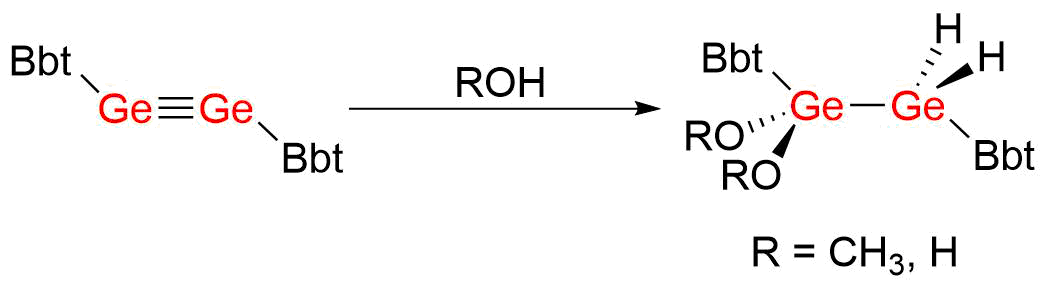
Addition reactions of BbtGeGeBbt with methanol and water

=== Coordination reaction ===
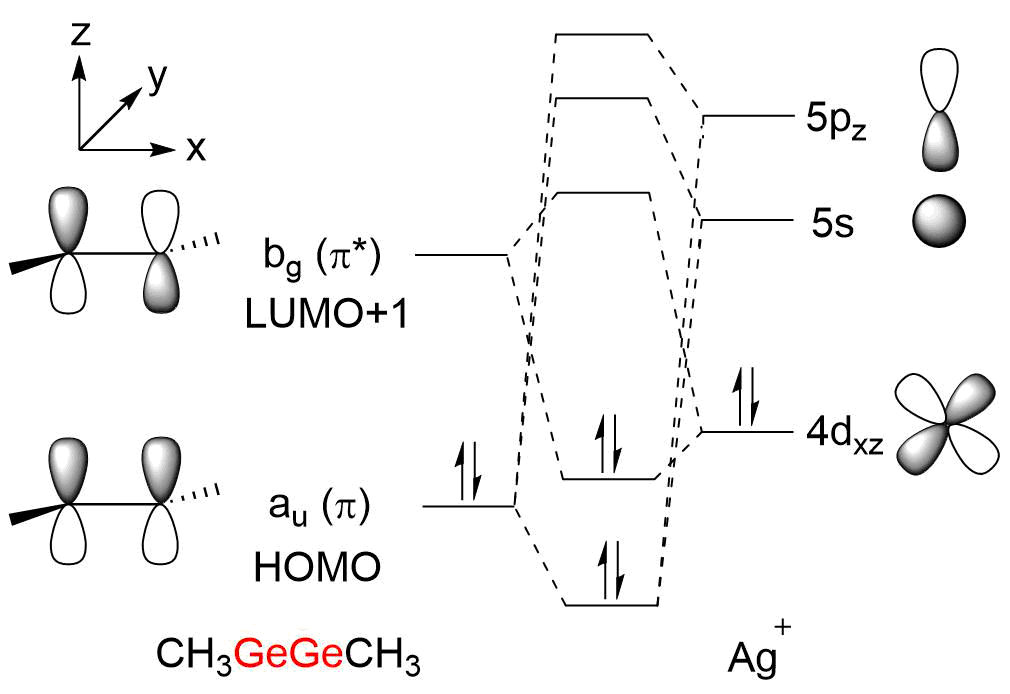
The quarlitative molecular orbital diagram of the interaction between Ar^{1}GeGeAr^{1} and Ag^{+}.

Noticing that the a_{u}(π) bonding orbital in digermynes has the ability to act as the π-electron donor, Ar^{1}GeGeAr^{1} can react with AgSbF_{6} to form [AgAr^{1}GeGeAr^{1}]^{+}SbF_{6}^{−} at -40 °C. [AgAr^{1}GeGeAr^{1}]^{+} has a C_{2} axis through the silver atom which is perpendicular to the CGeGeC plain and the midpoint of the Ge-Ge bond. The silver atom is coordinated by two Ge atoms and two arenes from Dipp groups of the bulky protecting groups. The bond between GeGe moiety and Ag^{+} is dominated by the interaction between the HOMO of Ar^{1}GeGeAr^{1} and 5s and 5p orbitals of Ag^{+}, which claims the σ-character of the interaction, while the π-character can be explained by the relative weak interaction of Ag 4d_{xz} orbital with π* orbital (LUMO+1). Therefore, it has been suggested that [AgAr^{1}GeGeAr^{1}]^{+} is a hybrid of π-complex and a metallacyclopropene-like σ-complex.

== See also ==
- Germanium(II) hydride
