= Germanium(II) hydrides =

Group 14 chemical compounds

Germanium(II) hydrides, also called germylene hydrides, are a class of Group 14 compounds consisting of low-valent germanium and a terminal hydride. They are also typically stabilized by an electron donor-acceptor interaction between the germanium atom and a large, bulky ligand.

== Synthesis ==
The first stable monomeric germylene hydride was reported by Roesky et al. in 2001. Initial attempts to synthesize the compound involved treating a β-diketiminato germylene chloride precursor, [{HC-(CMeNAr)_{2}}GeCl] (where Ar = 2,6-iPr_{2}C_{6}H), with LiAlH_{4}, though this proved unsuccessful, with the formation of an aluminum dihydride species instead. However, use of the weaker reducing agent NaBH_{4} resulted in the formation of a germylene hydride with a borane adduct. They found that the Ge-H bond was inert in this adduct, and so the borane adduct was able to be selectively removed at room temperature by a PMe_{3} scavenger, resulting in the desired terminal germylene hydride:

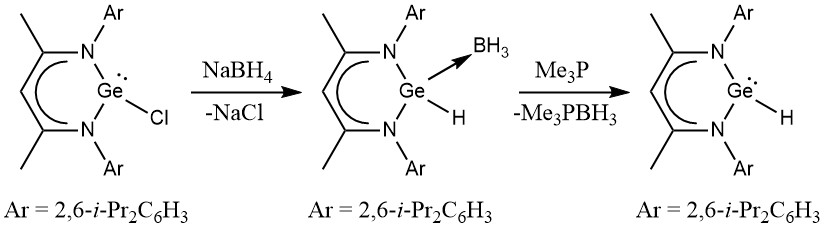
Synthesis of stable monomeric germylene hydride from a borane adduct

When the β-diketiminato germylene chloride was treated with the alane-amine adduct AlH_{3}•NMe_{3} in toluene at -4 °C, the solution underwent a color change from yellow to orange-red as the volatile trimethylamine was removed from the solution, and the resulting power was identified as the stable terminal germylene hydride with 60% yield, thus affording the first direct synthetic route:

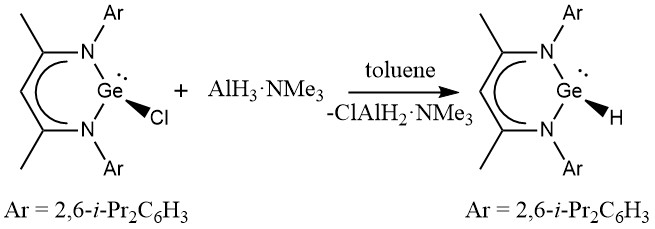
Direct synthesis of a stable, monomeric terminal germylene hydride

The synthesis and isolation of two digermanium germanium(II) hydrides have also been reported. One of these compounds was formed by the addition of L-selectride to a bulky germanium(II) chloride in ether, while the other was formed by the addition of L-selectride to the same germanium(II) chloride in toluene, followed by filtration and the dropwise addition of PMe_{3}.

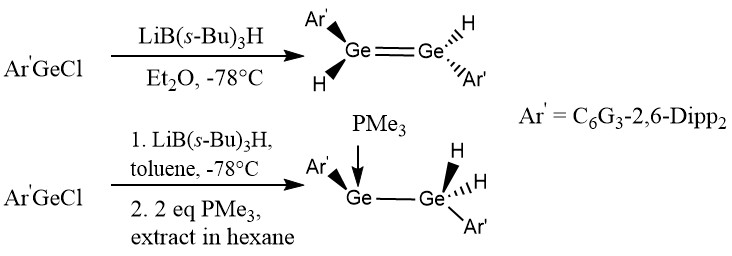

The first stable acyclic germylene hydride was formed from the dissociation of a hydrido-digermene. The initial monomeric germylene chloride was synthesized by the reaction of a bulky lithium amide ligand and GeCl_{2}•dioxane. Although synthesized from multiple synthetic pathways, reaction of the germylene chloride with L-selectride in toluene at -80 °C most directly gives the orange crystalline hydrido-digermene with 52% yield. This digermene is thought to be in equilibrium with a two-coordinate hydrido-germylene, which can be isolated upon addition of DMAP (dimethylaminopyridine) at 20 °C, giving pale yellow crystals of the three-coordinate germylene hydride in 27% yield.

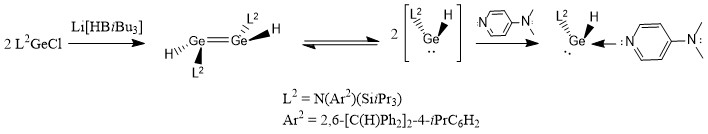
Synthesis of first stable acyclic germylene hydride

Similar to the germylene hydrides, the first known example of a germyliumylidene hydride (a germylene hydride cation) was isolated in 2014. This compound can be formed from a two step process, starting with the reaction of potassium bis(NHC)-borate with GeCl_{2}•dioxane to yield a zwitterionic germyliumylidene chloride. The Cl/H exchange can then be undergone via reaction with K[HB(s-Bu)_{3}] to give the germylene hydride cation in 91% yield.

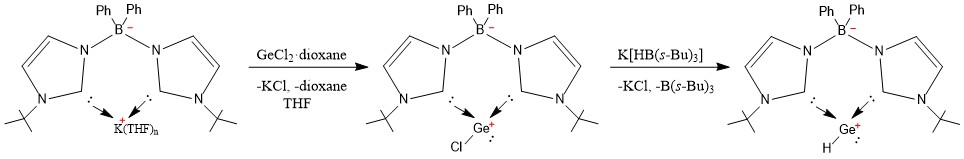
Synthesis of first stable monomeric germanium(II) hydride cation (a germyliumylidene hydride)

The germylene hydride cation was also further reacted with the trityl cation, [Ph_{3}C]^{+}[B(C_{6}F_{5})_{4}]^{−}, as a hydride scavenger, which resulted in the formation of an adduct with the three-coordinate germylene hydride cation acting a donor and a two-coordinate Ge(II) dication as an electron acceptor.

== Structure and bonding ==
The β-diketiminato germylene hydride reported Roesky et al. crystallizes in the P2_{1}/n space group as two isostructural molecules per unit. X-ray crystallographic analysis of the orange-red crystals showed that the germanium atom is tetrahedrally coordinated by the hydrogen atom, the β-diketiminato ligand, and the germanium lone pair. The Ge-N bond length is reported to be 1.989 Å and the Ge-H bond displays an absorption at 1733 cm^{−1}, corresponding to a stretching mode.

=== Atoms-in-molecules and electron localization function analysis ===
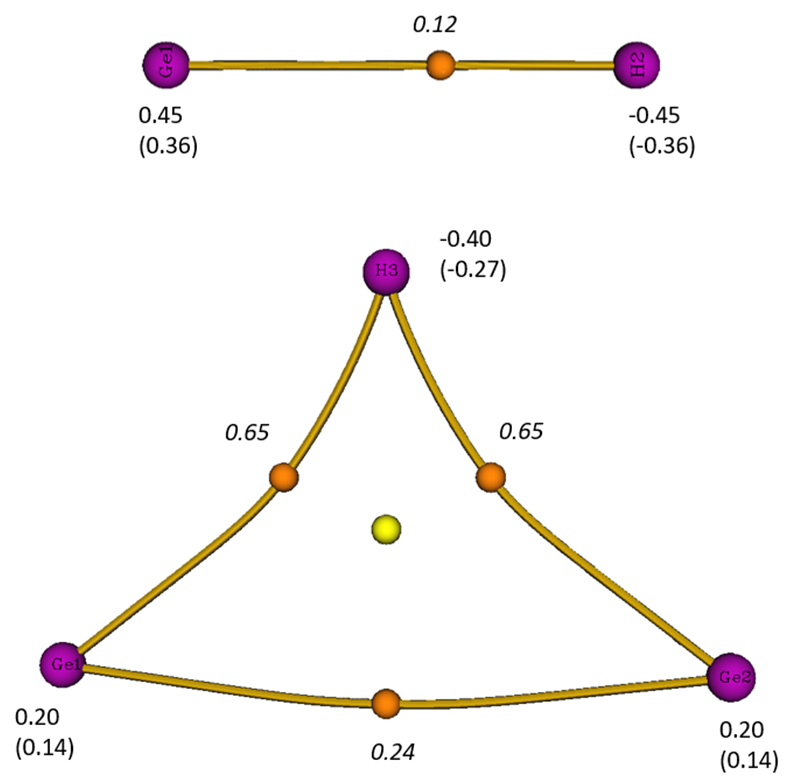
Molecular graphs of GeH and Ge_{2}H in the lowest lying electronic state. Bond critical points shownin orange with corresponding ellipticity values, ring critical points shown in yellow, and attractors shown in purple with atoms-in-molecules charges plus natural bond order charges shown in parentheses.

In an atoms-in-molecules analysis of GeH, 3 critical points (2 attractors and a bond critical point) were found. Computed natural bond order and atoms-in-molecules charges both showed a positive charge on germanium and a negative charge on the hydrogen, indicating a significant charge transfer to hydrogen and generating a Ge^{+}H^{−} polarization. Similar results were found for Ge_{2}H, with a positive charge on both germanium atoms and a negative charge on the hydrogen. However, there were 3 bond critical points found, as well as 1 ring critical point.

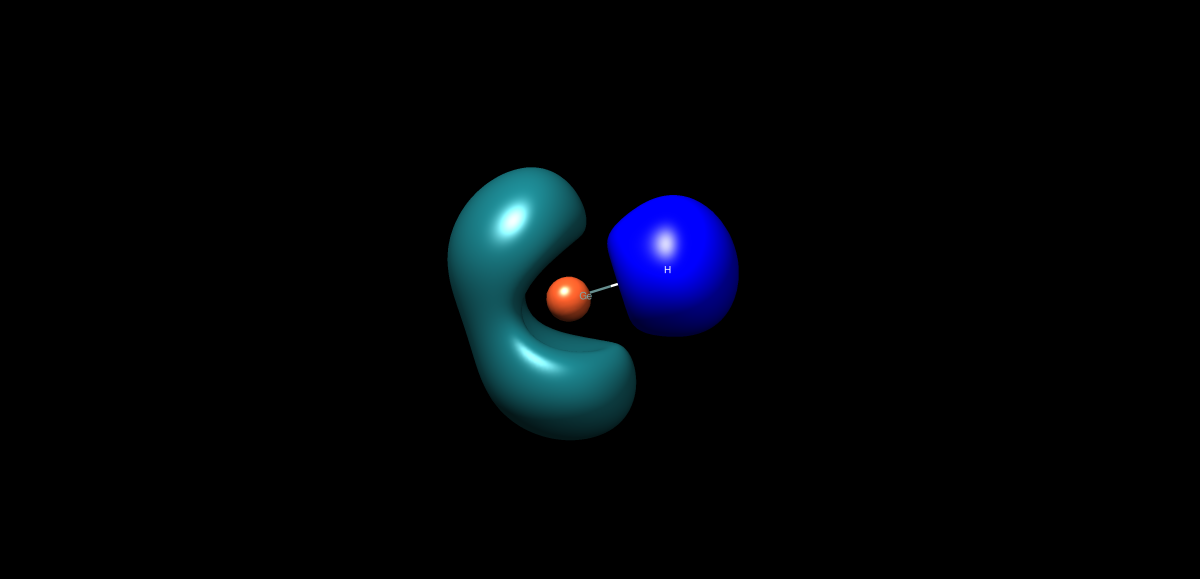
Electron localization function isosurface (η=0.7) of neutral GeH molecule in the ground electronic state. The C(Ge) basin is shown in orange, the V(Ge) basin is in turquoise, and the V(H,Ge).

== Reactions ==
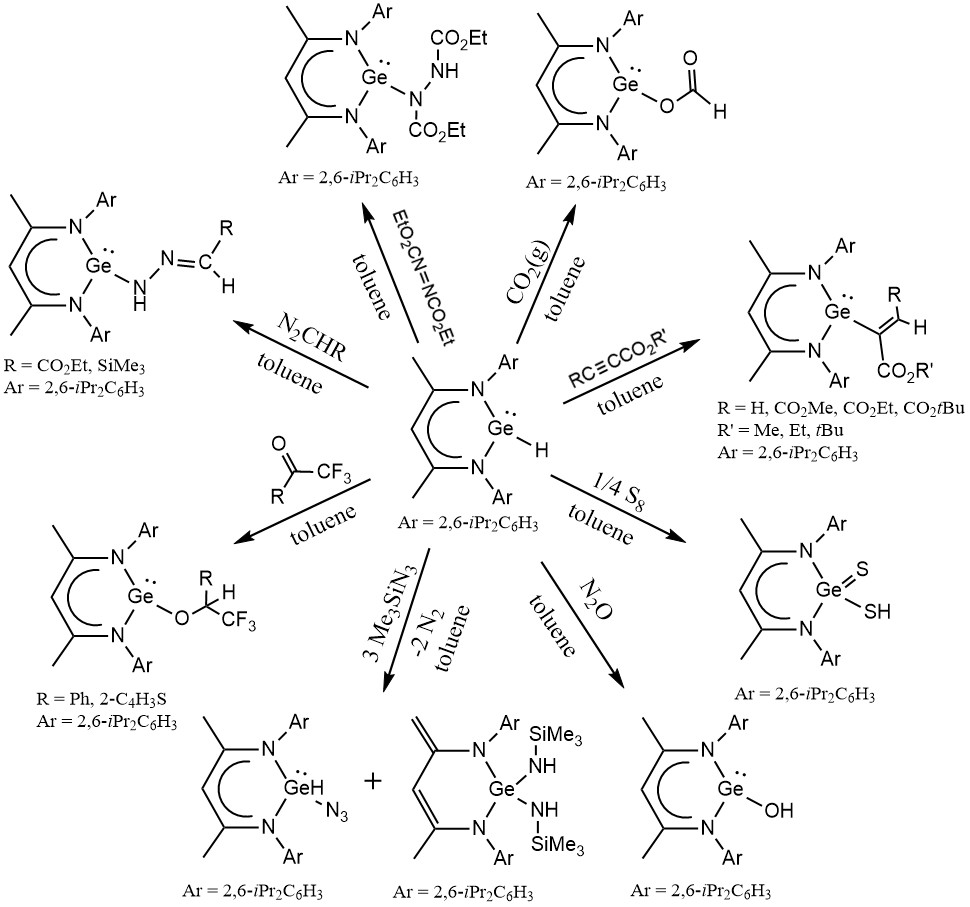
Reported reactions of β-diketiminato germylene hydride

=== Hydrogermylation ===
Germanium(II) hydrides have been reported to take part in a wide array of hydrogenation reactions. The first of these reactivities were reported by Jana et al. in 2009, but have been significantly expounded upon since then. The bulk of reported reactivities are for the β-diketiminato germylene hydride. For many of these reactions, including reactions with alkynes and carbon dioxide, germanium is found to retain its oxidation state during the transfer of hydrogen.

==== CO_{2} reduction ====
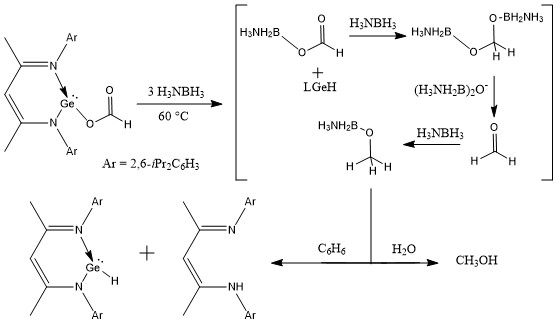
Proposed mechanism for conversion of carbon dioxide to methanol with a germylene hydride catalyst

The hydrogenation of carbon dioxide by the β-diketiminato germylene hydride proceeds at room temperature without a catalyst to form the germylene ester of formic acid in quantitative yield. This germylene ester is reported to further react at -78 °C with the nucleophile lithium amidoborane (LiH_{2}NBH_{3}), which can be formed by treatment of the commercially available ammonia borane with n-BuLi, to generate lithium formate in high yield (85%-95%). Lithium formate can be converted to formic acid with an acid workup and the original germylene hydride was found to reform in the generation of lithium formate, thus making a germylene hydride a potential catalyst for conversion of carbon dioxide to formic acid. Furthermore, it was found that the same germylene hydride reacts with 3 equivalents of ammonia borane at 60 °C in THF, producing methanol (after an aqueous workup) and again reforming the germylene hydride. The stability of the germylene hydride to water also allows it to be recovered from the other reaction products via an extraction in benzene, an important property for any catalyst to be used to generate chemical feedstocks.

In 2014 Tan et al. showed that the β-diketiminato germylene formate and a closely related germylene formate compound can both produce methanol in high yield with alane used as a hydride source, providing yet another route for germylene hydrides to be used as catalysts for carbon dioxide transformations.

==== Alkynes ====
The β-diketiminato germylene hydride is reported to react with several alkynes, including ethyl propiolate to form a vinyl germylene in good yield (>80%). This reaction occurs via the 1,2-addition of the germylene hydride across the alkyne triple bond, as opposed to an H_{2} elimination involving one of the C-H bonds of the alkyne. This reaction also requires no catalyst, in contrast to previously reported reactions of Ge(IV)-H and alkynes that have necessitated a variety of catalysts.

==== Ketones ====
Activated ketones, such as 2,2,2-trifluoroacetophenone, react with the β-diketiminato germylene hydride to form the corresponding germylene alkoxide in quantitative yield. This reaction proceeds through a nucleophilic hydride addition to the carbonyl carbon of the ketone. However, this reaction is unsuccessful with less electrophilic ketones, such as acetone and benzophenone.

==== Elemental sulfur ====
Two equivalents of elemental sulfur react with the β-diketiminato germylene hydride to give a germanium dithiocarboxylic acid analogue in moderate yield (60%). In formation of the product, the oxidation state of germanium changes from Ge(II) to Ge(IV), thus requiring both the insertion and oxidative addition of elemental sulfur into the Ge(II)-H bond. No intermediates have been isolated and the mechanistic order of these steps is currently unknown.

There was also no evidence found for any tautomeric equilibrium of the germanium dithiocarboxylic acid analogue, which is reflected in the two varying Ge-S bond lengths (2.064 Å and 2.242 Å).

=== Hydroboration ===
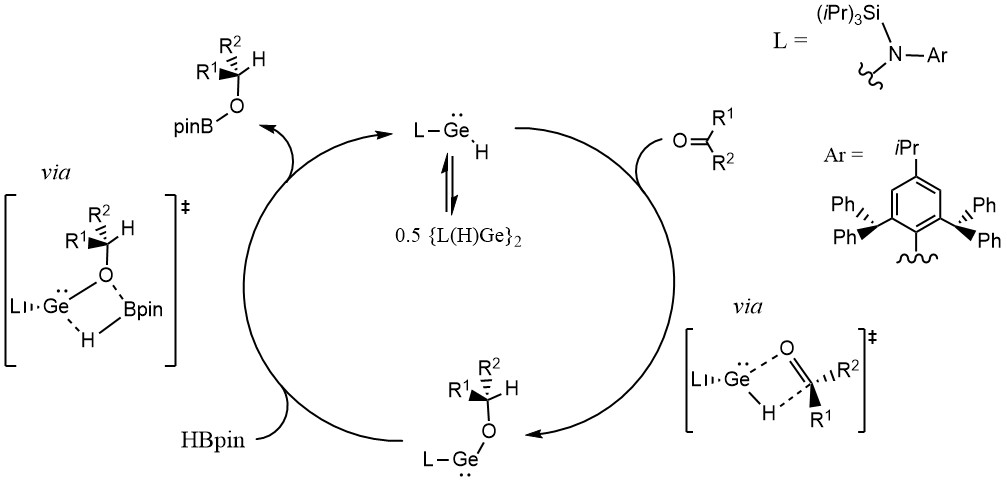
Proposed catalytic cycle for hydroboration of carbonyl compounds, (R^{1})(R^{2})CO (R^{1}/R^{2} = Alkyl, Aryl, or H), catalyzed by amido germylene hydride

The previously reported acyclic amido germylene hydride was found to catalyze the hydroboration of a variety of aldehydes and ketones with the mild borane reagent HBpin (pin = pinacolato). The catalytic efficiency of aldehyde conversions was markedly greater for aliphatic aldehydes, with turnover frequencies (TOFs) ranging from 2000-6000 h^{−1}, than for aromatic aldehydes, whose TOFs never exceeded 67. This efficiency discrepancy can be explained by the increased steric bulk of aromatic aldehydes that make it more difficult for the oxygen nucleophile to approach the Ge metal in the rate-determining step, as well as by the decreased Lewis basicity of the oxygen the aryl substituents impart.

The ketones were found to require a significantly higher catalyst loading than the aldehydes and, furthermore, reacted at a much slower rate than the aldehydes. Notably, however, the majority of reported catalytic efficiencies for both the aldehydes and ketones were greater for the germylene hydride than for previously reported transition metal catalyzed hydroborations using HBpin.

=== Other reactions ===
==== Nitrous oxide ====
Reaction of the β-diketiminato germylene hydride with nitrous oxide produces a germylene hydroxide, the first reported Group 14 metal hydride to react with N_{2}O in such a way. Nitrous oxide serves as an oxygen source to form this compound in almost quantitative yield.

==== Trimethylsilyl azide ====
Trimethylsilylazide (Me_{3}SiN_{3}) forms two products in a 1:1 ratio upon reaction with the β-diketiminato germylene hydride: a germanium(II) azide and a germanium(IV) diamide. The germanium(II) azide is thought to form from the metathesis of the germylene hydride and trimethylazide, with concomitant elimination of Me_{3}SiH. The mechanism for germanium(IV) diamide is less clear, though it is proposed that the pathway involves an oxidative addition-insertion of a nitrene (:NSiMe_{3}), formed in situ via dinitrogen elimination from the azide, along with intramolecular hydride shifts.

==== Azo and diazo compounds ====
The β-diketiminato germylene hydride has been reported to react with both ethyl diazoacetate and trimethylsilyldiazomethane, forming germanium(II)-substituted hydrazone derivatives. The reaction progresses by the end-on insertion of the diazoalkane into the Ge(II)-H bond, with subsequent hydrogen transfer to the nitrogen. Electronic structure analysis shows that the stability of the product stems from a shifting of electron density from the N-N bond onto the Ge-N bond. The analysis also shows that diazoalkane insertion destabilizes the ring structure and that the R-group likely plays little role in the stability of the compound.

The oxidative addition of the β-diketiminato germylene hydride with diethyl azodicarboxylate (DEAD) is also reported to proceed at room temperature in high yield.
