= Sijibomi Ogundele =

Nigerian entrepreneur (born 1981)

Sijibomi Ogundel
- Born: April 8, 1981 (age 45); Agege, Nigeria
- Education: Anglia Ruskin University
- Occupation: Real estate entrepreneur
- Known for: Real estate developments

Olasijibomi Ogundele (born April 8, 1981) is a Nigerian real estate entrepreneur. He is the ambassador to the Executive Governor of Lagos State.

== Early years and education ==
Sijibomi Ogundele was born in Agege, Nigeria. He attended Lagos State Model College, Merina and thereafter proceeded to the Anglia Ruskin University Cambridge Campus, United Kingdom to study law.

== Career ==
Sijibomi started his career as a real estate agent in France in 2011 then he founded Sujimoto Construction in 2013.

In 2020, Sijibomi was named in Nigeria's Top 10 list of Real Estate Disruptors then in August 2022, he was inducted as Lagos State Governor's ambassador, he was also listed among 60 leading real estate CEOs of 2022 in Nigeria by The Guardian (Nigeria).

Ogundele, who is the CEO of Sujimoto Luxury Construction Limited, was detained at the Force Criminal Investigations Department (FCID) in Abuja for alleged fraud and was released on bail in October 2024. Olasijibomi Ogundele was detained by the police after a human rights lawyer Pelumi Olajengbesi, petitioned the police and accused Ogundele of obtaining by false pretence the sum of $325,000 from one Kabiru Ibrahim on November 5, 2020.

On September 5, 2025, The Economic and Financial Crimes Commission (EFCC) has declared Olasijibomi Ogundele of Sujimoto Luxury Construction Limited, wanted for alleged diversion of funds and money laundering.

== Recognition ==
- Hospitality Honorarium Grand Award - South Africa Hotelier Conference 2017
- Vanguard Young Entrepreneur Of The Year 2021
- Business Day Next Bull Award - Business Day Awards 2021
