= Group 13/15 multiple bonds =

Heteroatomic multiple bonding between group 13 and group 15 elements are of great interest in synthetic chemistry due to their isoelectronicity with C-C multiple bonds. Nevertheless, the difference of electronegativity between group 13 and 15 leads to different character of bondings comparing to C-C multiple bonds. Because of the ineffective overlap between p𝝅 orbitals and the inherent lewis acidity/basicity of group 13/15 elements, the synthesis of compounds containing such multiple bonds is challenging and subject to oligomerization. The most common example of compounds with 13/15 group multiple bonds are those with B=N units. The boron-nitrogen-hydride compounds are candidates for hydrogen storage. In contrast, multiple bonding between aluminium and nitrogen Al=N, Gallium and nitrogen (Ga=N), boron and phosphorus (B=P), or boron and arsenic (B=As) are less common.

== Synthesis ==
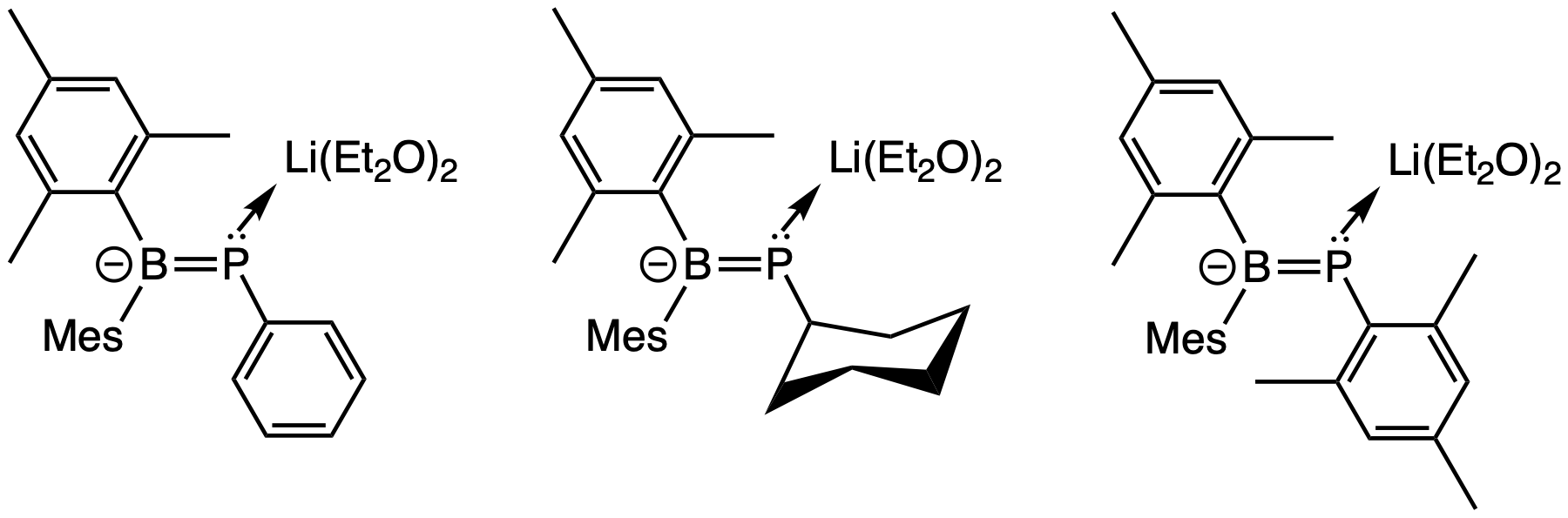
P(R)=BMes_{2}Li(Et_{2}O)_{2} (R = phenyl, cyclohexane, mesitylene)

Suitable precursors are crucial for the synthesis of group 13/15 multiple bond-containing species. In most successfully isolated structures, sterically demanding ligands are utilized to stabilize such bondings.

=== Boraphosphenes (P=B) ===
Boraphosphenes, also known as phosphoboranes, was first reported by Cowley and co-workers in the 1980s. [(tmp)B=P(Ar)] (tmp= 2,2,6,6,-tetramethylpiperidina, Ar= 2,4,6-t-Bu_{3}C_{6}H_{2}) was characterized by mass spectroscopy (EI MS), and the corresponding dimer, diphosphadiboretane, was characterized by X-ray crystallography. The Power and co-workers later reported the structure of [P(R)=BMes_{2}Li(Et_{2}O)_{2}] (R = phenyl, cyclohexane, and mesitylene), which is the first B=P double bond observed in solid state. The synthesis of [P(R)=BMes_{2}Li(Et_{2}O)_{2}] starts from treating in-situ generated Mes_{2}BPHR with 1 equivalent of t-BuLi in Et_{2}O, followed by crystallization at low temperature.

==== Cyclic system with P-B multiple bonds ====
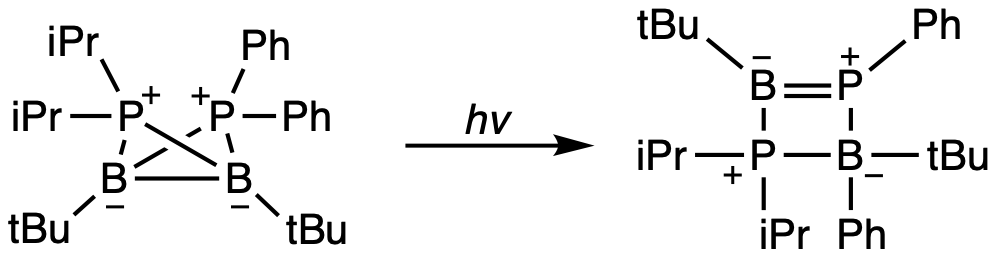
Photo-induced isomerization of cycle-[(iPr)_{2}PB(tBu)-B(tBu)-P(Ph)_{2}]

Isomerization of four-member P-B cycles was investigated by Bourissou and Bertrand. It was reported that cycle-[R_{2}PB(R')-B(R')-P(Ph)_{2}] (R = phenyl, isopropyl; R'= tert-butyl, 2,3,5,6-tetramethyl phenyl) isomerize to form cycle-[R_{2}P-B(R')=P(Ph)-B(R')(Ph)] upon irradiation. An example of five-membered ring was reported by Crossley suggesting that a reaction of 1,2-diphosphinobenzene with n-BuLi and Cl_{2}BPh yielded a benzodiphosphaborolediide. Several six-membered ring systems involving P=B double bonds have been reported. One of the example is an analogue of borazine synthesizing from MesBBr_{2} and CyP(H)Li.

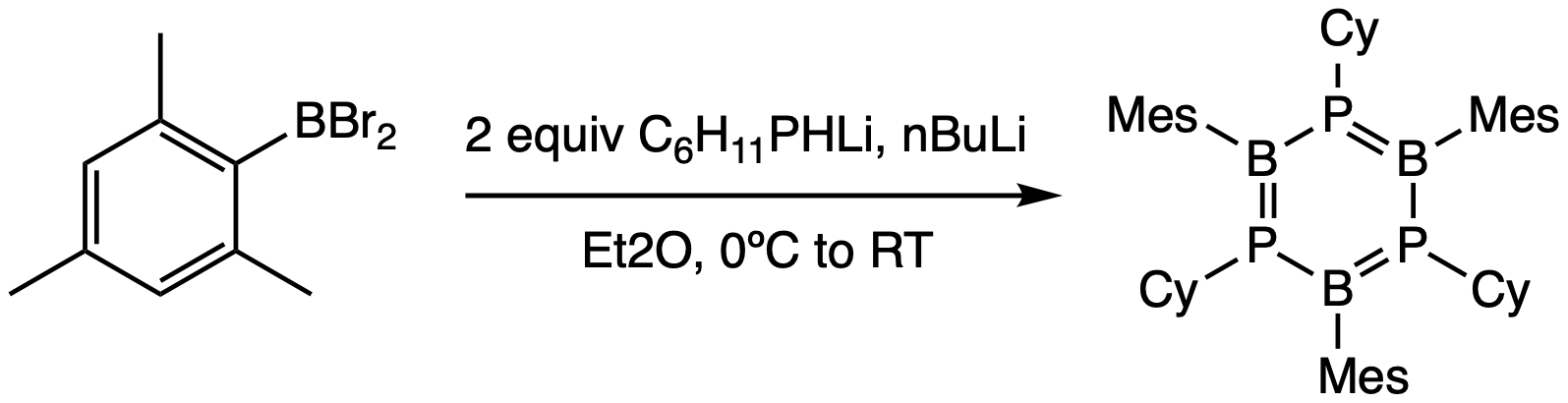
Synthesis of a borazine analogue containing P=B bonds

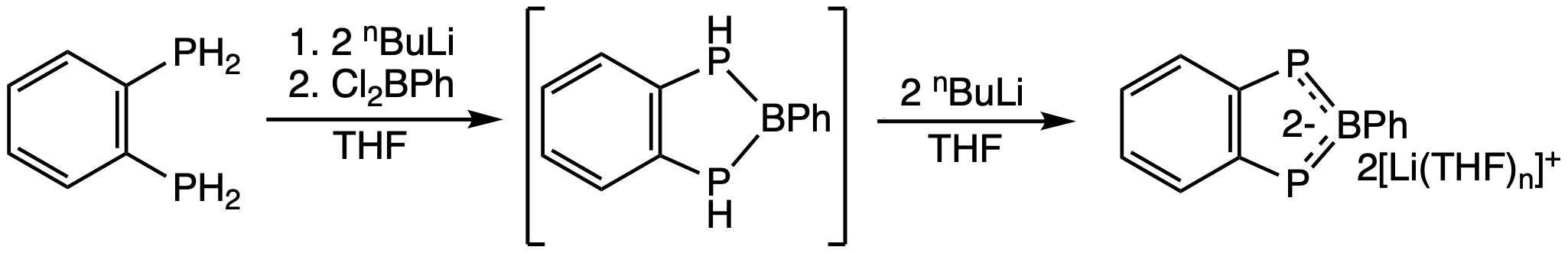
Synthesis of a benzodiphosphaborolediide

=== Arsinideneborates (As=B) ===
A similar strategy to access litigated arsinideneborate was reported by Power and co-workers after the establishment of synthesizing litigated phosphinideneborates. Crystallizing [As(Ph)=BMes_{2}Li(THF)_{3}] with two equivalence of TMEDA yielded [As(Ph)=BMes_{2}][Li(TMEDA)_{2}]. Ring-systems containing As-B multiple bonds haven't been reported yet.

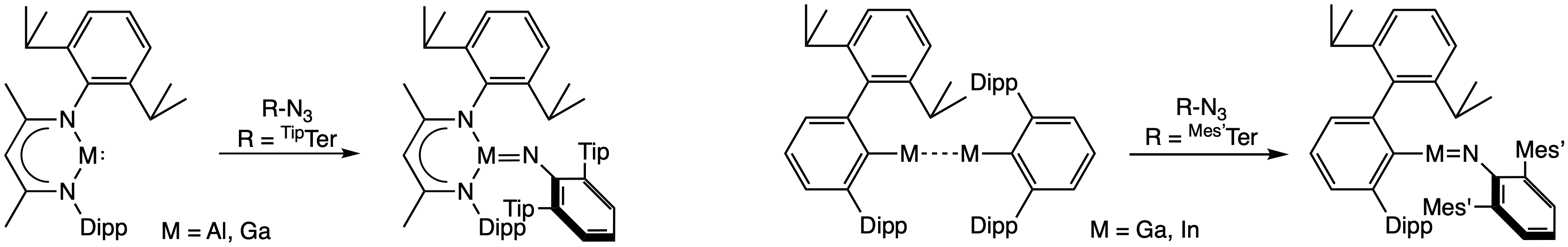
Synthesis of [{^{Dip}Nacnc}M=N-^{Tip}Ter] (M=Al, Ga) and [(^{Dip}Ter)M=N-^{Mes'}Ter] (M=Ga, In)

=== Group 13 imides (Al=N, Ga=N, In=N) ===
Synthesis of group 13 imides usually starts with low valent group 13 species stabilized by bulky ligands. A [2+3] cycloaddition of monomeric [^{Dip}Nacnc]Al or [^{Dip}Nacnc]Ga (^{Dip}Nacnc= HC{(CMe)(NDip)}_{2}) compound with sterically bulky azide, ^{Tip}TerN3 (^{Tip}Ter = -C_{6}H_{3}-2,6-(C_{6}H_{2}-2,4,6-iPr_{3})_{2}), gives the iminotrielenes [{^{Dip}Nacnc}M=N-^{Tip}Ter] (M=Al, Ga). Additionally, dimers of Ga(I) or In(I) were reported to form the iminotrielens [(^{Dip}Ter)M=N-^{Mes'}Ter] with ^{Mes'}TerN_{3} (M = Ga, In; ^{Mes'}Ter =C_{6}H_{3}-2,6(Xyl-4-tBu)_{2}).

==== Al-N triple bonds ====
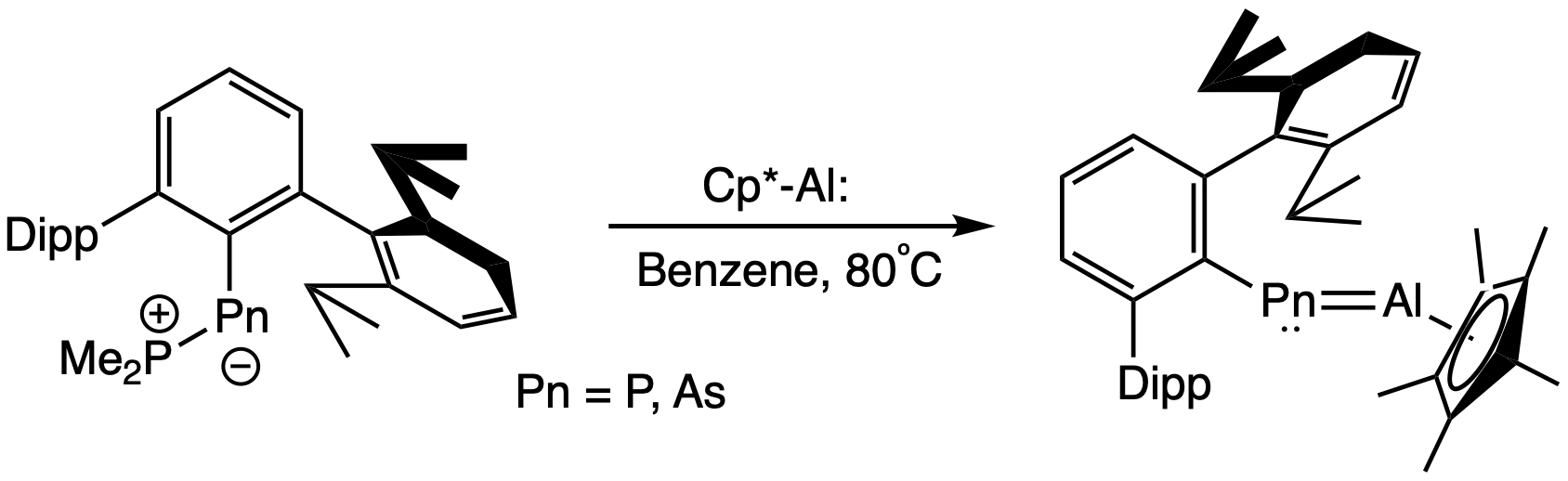
Synthesis of ^{Dip}TerPnAlCp* (Pn = P, As)

Transient Al≡N triple bond species were also investigated by reacting monomeric alanediyl precursor with organic azides. The unstable Al≡N triple bond species [iPr_{2}^{TIP}TerAl≡NR] (R = Ad, SiMe_{3}) was not capture but further rearrange to tetrazole and amino-azide alone, respectively.

=== Phosphaalumenes and Arsaalumenes (P=Al, As=Al) ===
The development of Al=P and Al=As species faced the difficulty due to the tendency of oligomerization of the lewis acidic Al and lewis basic P/As. In 2021, Hering-Junghans, Braunchweig, and co-workers reported the synthesis of phosphaalumens and arsaalumens with Al(I) precursors, [Al(I)Cp*]_{4} (Cp* = pentamethylcyclopentadiene). Reacting [Al(I)Cp*]_{4} with ^{Dip}Ter-AsPMe_{3} or ^{Dip}Ter-AsPMe_{3} at 1:4 ratio yielded the corresponding phosphaalumens/arsaalumens, which are stable and isolable.

=== Gallium-pnictogen double bonds (Ga=Pn) ===
[[File:Ga=As.png|thumb|834x834px|Synthesis of [^{Dip}NacncGa=AsCp*] and {{bracket|^{Dip}Nacnc(Cl)Ga}}_{2}Sb]] Synthesis and characterization of Ga=Sb species was reported by Schulz and Cutsail III with the reaction of [^{Dip}Nacnc]Ga (^{Dip}Nacnc= HC{(CMe)(NDip)}_{2}) with [Cp*SbCl_{2}]. The resulting Sb radical species, [^{Dip}Nacnc(Cl)Ga]_{2}Sb, was then reduced by KC_{8} to give [^{Dip}NacncGa=Sb-Ga(Cl)^{Dip}Nacnc]. Utilizing the similar reaction pathway, a Ga=As species, [^{Dip}NacncGa=AsCp*], was successfully synthesized and stabilized. Interestingly, no radical formation was observed comparing to the case of Ga=Sb species. With the rapid development of gallium pnictogen in the late 2010s, the first phosphagallene species was reported by Goicoechea and co-workers in 2020. The reaction of [(HC)_{2}(NDip)_{2}PPCO] with [^{Dip}NacncGa] gave the phosphagallene, [^{Dip}NacncGa=P-P(NDip)_{2}(CH)_{2}].

== Reactivities ==
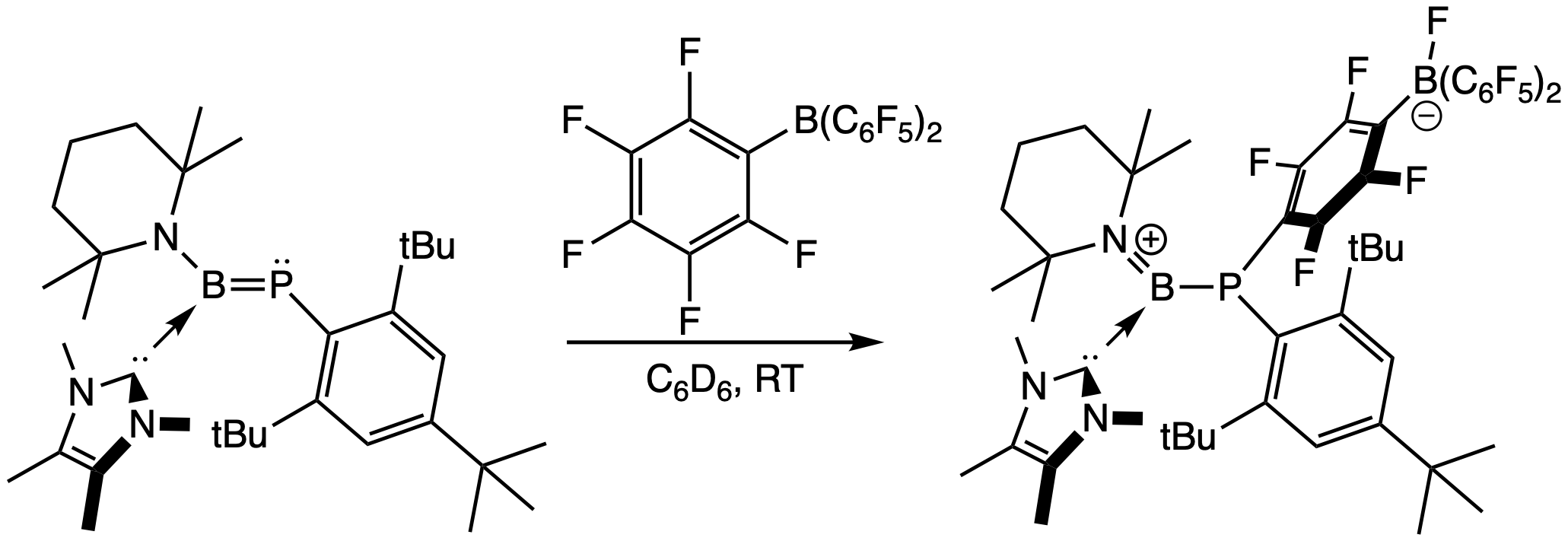
C-F activation of tris(pentafluorophenyl)borane by [(tmp)(L)B=PMes*] (L = IMe_{4})

=== Reactivities of boraphosphenes ===
B=P double bond species has been studied for bond activation. For example, C-F activation of tris(pentafluorophenyl)borane by NHC-stabilized phosphaboranes, [(tmp)(L)B=PMes*] (L = IMe_{4}), was reported by Cowley and co-workers. The C-F bond activation takes place at the para position, leading to the formation of C-P bond. Reactions of phenyl acetylene with the dimer of [Mes*P=B(tmp)] give an analogue of cycle-butene, [Mes*P=C(Ph)-C(H)=B(tmp)], where C-C triple bond undergoes a [2+2]-cycloaddition to P=B double bond.

==== Phospha-bora Wittig reaction ====
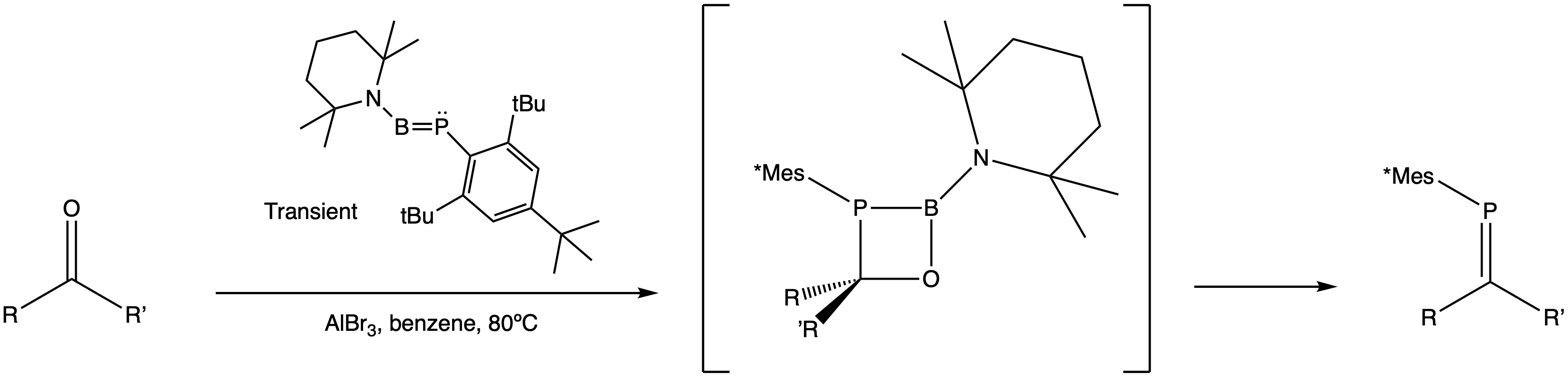
Phospha-bora Wittig reaction

Transient boraphosphene [(tmp)B=PMes*)] (tmp = 2,2,6,6-tetramethylpiperidine, Mes* = 2,4,6-tri-tert-butylphenyl) reacts with aldehyde, ketone, and esters to form phosphaboraoxetanes, which converts to phosphaalkenes [Mes*P=CRR'] and [(tmp)NBO]_{x} heterocycles. This method provides direct access of phosphaalkenes from carbonyl compounds.

=== Reactivities of group 13 imides ===
Compounds with group 13-N multiple bonds are capable of small molecule activation. Reactions of PhCCH or PhNH_{2} with NHC-stabilized iminoalane result in the addition of proton to N and -CCPh or -NHPh fragment to Al. The reaction with CO leads to the insertion of CO between the Al=N bond.

=== Reactivities of Ga=Pn species ===
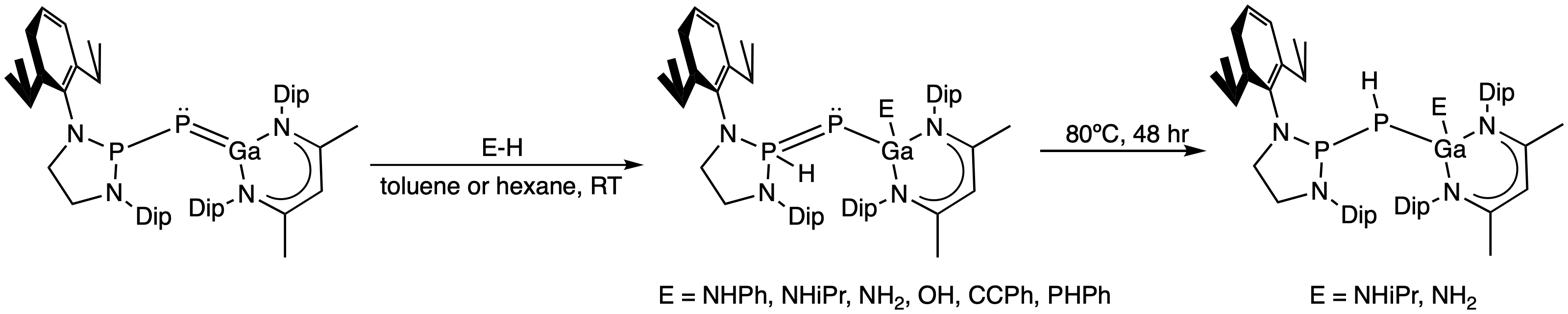
Polar bonds activation by [^{Dip}Nacnc(RN)Ga-P-P(H)(NDip)_{2}(CH_{2})_{2}]

Small molecule activation takes place across the P-P=Ga bonds in phosphanyl-phosphagallenes species, where the Ga=P species behave as frustrated Lewis pairs. For example, the reaction of CO_{2} with [^{Dip}NacncGa=P-P(NDip)_{2}(CH_{2})_{2}] results in the formation of a P=P-C-O-Ga five-membered ring species. In contrast, H_{2} addition to the P-P=Ga fragment in a 1,3-activation manner. E-H bond activation of protic and hydridic reagents was investigated as well. Reactions of [^{Dip}NacncGa=P-P(NDip)_{2}(CH_{2})_{2}] toward amines, phosphines, alkynes resulted in the formation of [^{Dip}Nacnc(E)Ga-P-P(H)(NDip)_{2}(CH_{2})_{2}]. Reversible ammonia activation was observed under 1 bar pressure in the presence of a Lewis acid.

== Bonding and structures ==
=== B=P double bond ===
Natural bond orbital analysis of a borophosphide anion, [(Mes*)P=BClCp*]^{−}, suggested that the B-P double bonds are polarized to the P atom. The B=P 𝝈-bond is mostly non-polar while the 𝝅-bond is polarized to the phosphorus (71%). DFT calculation at B3LYP/6-31G level revealed that the HOMO of [(Mes*)P=BClCp*]^{−} has great B-P 𝝅-bonding character. In most reported phosphinideneborates, the phosphorus chemical shifts are much more deshielded than the starting materials, phosphinoboranes. The down-field resonances of phosphorus in ^{31}P NMR suggest the delocalization of lone pairs into the empty p-orbital of boron.

Selected NMR chemical shifts (ppm) and bond length (pm) of anionic compounds with B=P bond
| Compound | ^{11}B NMR | ^{31}P NMR | d(B-P) |
|---|---|---|---|
| [P(Cy)=BMes_{2}Li(Et_{2}O)_{2}] | 65.6 | 70.1 | 183.2(6) |
| [P(Mes)=BMes_{2}Li(Et_{2}O)_{2}] | 63.7 | 55.5 | 182.3(7) |
| [P(Ad)=BMes_{2}Li(Et_{2}O)_{x}] | 85.7 | 90.4 | 182.3(8) |
| [P(tBu)=BTip_{2}Li(Et_{2}O)_{2}] | 58.9 | 113.2 | 183.6(2) |
| [P(SiMe_{3})=BMes_{2}Li(THF)_{3}] | 71.7 | -49.2 | 183.3(6) |

Selected NMR chemical shifts (ppm) and bond length (pm) of Lewis acid/base stabilized compounds with B=P bond
| Compound | ^{11}B NMR | ^{31}P NMR | d(B-P) |
|---|---|---|---|
| [Cr(CO)_{5}{(tmp)B=PC(Et)_{3}} | 62.9 | -45.3 | 174.3(5) |
| [AlBr_{3}{(tmp)B=P(tBu)}] | 68.4 | -59.8 | 178.7(4) |
| [(tmp)(DMAP)B=P^{Tip}Ter] | 41.2 | 57.3 | 180.92(17) |
| [Cp*(DMAP)B=PMes*] | 52.3 | 96.7 | 179.5(3) |
| [Cp*(IMe_{4})B=PMes*] | 48.5 | 192.9 | 180.67(15) |
| [Cp*B(Br)=PMes*][IiPrSiMe_{3}] | 54.9 | 75.2 | 180.39(16) |
| [(tmp)(DMAP)B=PMes*] | 44.5 | 64.0 | 182.11(16) |
| [(tmp)(IMe_{4})B=PMes*] | 43.9 | 151.5 | 183.09(16) |

=== Ga-Pn double bond ===
Natural bond orbital analysis was reported for Ga=Sb and Ga=Bi containing species, where electron populates more on Sb and Bi (62% and 59%, respectively). The Lewis acidic Ga results in the delocalization of electrons in Sb and Bi.
