= DIPP =

- Also known as: Dipp Amayzine, Half Man-Half Amazing
- Born: Nigeria
- Genres: RnB, Pop
- Occupations: Singer, dancer, songwriter
- Years active: 2000–present
- Label: Effyzzie Entertainment (former)
- Website: Reverbnation/Dipp

Oladipupo Ogundele, who is known by his stage name, DIPP, is a Nigerian singer, songwriter, and dancer; hailing from the Yoruba tribe. He has won several music awards including the awards for Best Choreography at the NMVA - Nigerian Music Video Awards 2010.

== Early life and education ==
DIPP was born into a family of five boys. Dipp has a BSc in Building from Ahmadu Bello University, Zaria.

His stage name came during his time at Ahmadu Bello University. He said "I had a lot of friends who called me different names. My full name is Oladipupo Ogundele so they called me Dipo and they eventually slapped it down to Dipp." and Ogundele meaning arriving home.

== Music career ==
DIPP started recording his debut solo album, The Future is Now, in 2005. The album aims for a combination of indigenous and international renditions of the R&B genre while describing the struggles of a man striving to achieve his destiny.

In 2009, he won the Best Special Effects and Editing award at the Sound City Music Awards for his music video "Dangerous" which was directed by special-effects wizard, MEX. Later in the year, he released his second single, 'Pop Off Selecta'. DIPP collaborated once again with MEX in order to produce the 'Pop Off Selecta' video which quickly gained popularity. In less than two months, 'Pop Off Selecta' had risen up the charts and peaked at the number one spot in Sound City Top Ten Videos chart where it remained for many weeks. He won two awards at the NMVA 2010 for Best Use of Special Effects and Best Choreography. After taking a break from the music industry, DIPP returned with his song 'Play Love'. His most recent song, 'Sunshine', was released August 6, 2022.

In an interview, DIPP said that he draws inspiration from Usher, Ginuwine, and Michael Jackson, crediting them for teaching him how to integrate dance into his performances.

== Discography ==
DIPP's debut album, Future Is Now (2011) has 13 tracks and 3 bonus tracks:

1. Fly Away
2. Let It Go ft. Sossick
3. I Do
4. Which Is the Way
5. Follow Me Go
6. Kosorombe ft. Da Grin
7. Snow in Africa
8. Good Girls ft. YQ
9. Jeje
10. Rock Your Body ft. Yemi Alade
11. Jezebel ft. Waje
12. Pop Off Selecta
13. Fire In the Club ft. Maytronomy

Bonus tracks

- Dangerous ft. MI
- Good Girls remix ft. YQ, Mode 9, Maytronomy, Beazy and Ill Bliss
- Good Girls remix ft. YQ, Blaise, Kel, and Muna

== Awards ==
Year	Institution	Nominated work	Award	Result
2009	SMVA	Dangerous ft. MI	Best Special Effect Editing	Won
2009	SMVA	Dangerous ft. MI	Best Choreography	Nominated
2009	SMVA	Dangerous ft. MI	Best R&B or Pop Video	Nominated
2010	NMVA	Pop Off Selecta	Best Use of Choreography	Won
2010	NMVA	Pop Off Selecta	Best Use of Effects	Won
2010	NMVA	Pop Off Selecta	Video of the Year	Nominated
2010	NMVA	Pop Off Selecta	Best Use of Costume	Nominated
2011	NMVA	Kosorombe ft. Da Grin	Best Choreography	Nominated
2011	NMVA	Kosorombe ft. Da Grin	Best R&B Video	Nominated

== Management ==
DIPP is one of the partners and the first artist to be produced by Effyzzie Entertainment which was nominated for the "Best Producer" NMVA 2010.
