= Boranes =

Class of chemical compounds

Triethylborane is a trialkylborane.

A borane is a compound with the formula B_{x}H_{y}R_{z} although examples include multi-boron derivatives. Most of the known group 13 hydrides belong to this class. A large family of boron hydride clusters is also known. In addition to some applications in organic chemistry, the boranes have attracted much attention as they exhibit structures and bonding that differs strongly from the patterns seen in hydrocarbons. Hybrids of boranes and hydrocarbons, the carboranes, are also a well developed class of compounds.

== History ==
The development of the chemistry of boranes led to innovations in synthetic methods as well as structure and bonding. First, new synthetic techniques were required to handle diborane and many of its derivatives, which are both pyrophoric and volatile. Alfred Stock invented the glass vacuum line for this purpose. The structure of diborane was correctly predicted in 1943 many years after its discovery. Interest in boranes increased during World War II due to the potential of uranium borohydride for enrichment of the uranium isotopes and as a source of hydrogen for inflating weather balloons. In the US, a team led by Schlesinger developed the basic chemistry of the anionic boron hydrides and the related aluminium hydrides. Schlesinger's work laid the foundation for a host of boron hydride reagents for organic synthesis, most of which were developed by his student Herbert C. Brown. Borane-based reagents are now widely used in organic synthesis. Brown was awarded the Nobel Prize in Chemistry in 1979 for this work.

== Synthesis ==
Most boranes are prepared directly or indirectly from diborane. Diborane reacts with alkenes to give alkylboranes, a process known as hydroboration:

B_{2}H_{6} + 2 CH_{2}=CHR → 2 BH_{2}(CH_{2}CH_{2}R)
B_{2}H_{6} + 4 CH_{2}=CHR → 2 BH(CH_{2}CH_{2}R)_{2}
B_{2}H_{6} + 6 CH_{2}=CHR → 2 B(CH_{2}CH_{2}R)_{3}

Alkyl and aryl boranes can also be produced by alkylation of chloroboranes and boronic esters.

== Classes of boranes ==
Some specialty boranes used in organic synthesis

Thexylborane

9-Borabicyclo[3.3.1]nonane ("9-BBN")

Disiamylborane ("Sia_{2}BH")

Alpine borane

Diisopinocampheylborane

=== Binary boron hydrides ===
The parent boranes are binary boron hydrides, starting with borane (BH_{3}) and its dimer diborane (B_{2}H_{6}). Pyrolysis of these species leads to higher boranes, such as tetraborane (B_{4}H_{10}) and pentaborane (B_{5}H_{9}). These two are early members of the boron hydride clusters.

=== Primary and secondary boranes ===
This family of boron hydrides includes mono- and dialkylboranes. The simplest members readily engage in redistribution reactions:

B_{2}H_{4}(CH_{3})_{2} → 0.5 B_{2}H_{2}(CH_{3})_{4} + 0.5 B_{2}H_{6}

With bulky substituents, primary and secondary boranes are more readily isolable and even useful. Examples include thexylborane and 9-BBN. Almost all primary and secondary boranes are dimeric with bridging hydrides.

=== Tertiary boranes ===
Most work focuses on trialkyl and triaryl boranes. These are all monomers (in contrast to the corresponding trialkyl and triarylaluminium compounds). Their BC_{3} cores are planar. Well known examples are trimethylboron, triethylboron, and triphenylboron. Many tertiary boranes are produced by hydroboration.

== Reactivity of boranes ==
The lowest borane, BH_{3} exists only transiently, dimerizing instantly to form diborane, B_{2}H_{6}. Its adduct borane–tetrahydrofuran and borane–dimethylsulfide are useful in hydroboration reactions.
