= Disiamylborane =

Names
- IUPAC name Bis(3-methylbutan-2-yl)borane
- Other names Bis(1,2-dimethylpropyl)borane

Identifiers
CAS Number	1069-54-1
3D model (JSmol)	Interactive image; Interactive image
ChemSpider	167251
PubChem CID	192733
UNII	2O6VD8483R
CompTox Dashboard (EPA)	DTXSID40910174
- InChI: InChI=1S/C10H23B/c1-7(2)9(5)11-10(6)8(3)4/h7-11H,1-6H3 Key: HXJFQNUWPUICNY-UHFFFAOYSA-N; InChI=1/C10H23B/c1-7(2)9(5)11-10(6)8(3)4/h7-11H,1-6H3 Key: HXJFQNUWPUICNY-UHFFFAOYAY
- SMILES: CC(C(C)C)BC(C)C(C)C; B(C(C(C)C)C)C(C)C(C)C

Properties
Chemical formula	C_{10}H_{23}B
Molar mass	154.09 g/mol
Melting point	35-40 °C
- Except where otherwise noted, data are given for materials in their standard state (at 25 °C [77 °F], 100 kPa). verify (what is ?) Infobox references

Disiamylborane (bis(1,2-dimethylpropyl)borane) is an organoborane with the formula [((CH_{3})_{2}CHCH(CH_{3}))_{2}BH]_{2} (abbreviation: Sia_{2}BH). It is a colorless waxy solid that is used in organic synthesis for hydroboration–oxidation reactions. Like most dialkyl boron hydrides, it has a dimeric structure with bridging hydrides.

== Reactions ==
Disiamylborane is prepared by hydroboration of trimethylethylene with diborane. The reaction stops at the secondary borane due to steric hindrance.

Disiamylborane is relatively selective for terminal alkynes and alkenes vs internal alkynes and alkenes. Like most hydroboration, the addition proceeds in an anti-Markovnikov manner. It can be used to convert terminal alkynes, into aldehydes.

The hydroboration process proceeds via an initial dissociation of the dimer.

== Related reagents ==
- 9-Borabicyclo[3.3.1]nonane (9-BBN).
- Thexylborane ((1,1,2-trimethylpropyl)borane, ThxBH_{2}), a primary borane obtained by hydroboration of tetramethylethylene.

== Naming ==
The prefix disiamyl is an abbreviation for "di-sec-isoamyl", where sec-isoamyl ("secondary isoamyl") is an archaic name for the 1,2-dimethylpropyl group (amyl being an obsolescent synonym of pentyl).
