= Dehydrogenation =

Chemical reaction involving the removal of hydrogen

In chemistry, dehydrogenation is a chemical reaction that involves the removal of hydrogen, usually from an organic molecule. It is the reverse of hydrogenation. Dehydrogenation is important, both as a useful reaction and a serious problem. At its simplest, it is a useful way of converting alkanes, which are relatively inert and thus low-valued, to alkenes, which are reactive and thus more valuable. Alkenes are precursors to aldehydes (R−CH=O), alcohols (R−OH), polymers, and aromatics. As a problematic reaction, the fouling and inactivation of many catalysts arises via coking, which is the dehydrogenative polymerization of organic substrates.

Enzymes that catalyze dehydrogenation are called dehydrogenases.

== Heterogeneous catalytic routes ==
=== Styrene ===
Dehydrogenation processes are used extensively to produce aromatics in the petrochemical industry. Such processes are highly endothermic and require temperatures of 500 °C and above. Dehydrogenation also converts saturated fats to unsaturated fats. One of the largest scale dehydrogenation reactions is the production of styrene by dehydrogenation of ethylbenzene. Typical dehydrogenation catalysts are based on iron(III) oxide, promoted by several percent potassium oxide or potassium carbonate.

C_{6}H_{5}CH_{2}CH_{3} → C_{6}H_{5}CH=CH_{2} + H_{2}

=== Other alkenes ===
The cracking processes, especially fluid catalytic cracking and steam cracking, produce high-purity mono-olefins from paraffins. Typical operating conditions use chromium (III) oxide catalyst at 500 °C. Target products are propylene, butenes, and isopentane, etc. These simple compounds are important raw materials for the synthesis of polymers and gasoline additives.

=== Alcohols to aldehydes ===
Alcohols can be selectively dehydrogenated to give aldehydes. This in employed in the industrial production of butanone and is important in the production of certain aroma compounds.

== Oxidative dehydrogenation ==
Relative to thermal cracking of alkanes, oxidative dehydrogenation (ODH) is of interest for two reasons: (1) undesired reactions take place at high temperature leading to coking and catalyst deactivation, making frequent regeneration of the catalyst unavoidable, (2) thermal dehydrogenation is expensive as it requires a large amount of heat. Oxidative dehydrogenation (ODH) of n-butane is an alternative to classical dehydrogenation, steam cracking and fluid catalytic cracking processes.

Formaldehyde is produced industrially by oxidative dehydrogenation of methanol. This reaction can also be viewed as a dehydrogenation using O_{2} as the acceptor. The most common catalysts are silver metal, iron(III) oxide, iron molybdenum oxides [e.g. iron(III) molybdate] with a molybdenum-enriched surface, or vanadium oxides. In the commonly used formox process, methanol and oxygen react at ca. 250–400 °C (480–750 °F) in the presence of iron oxide in combination with molybdenum and/or vanadium to produce formaldehyde according to the chemical equation:

2 CH_{3}OH + O_{2} → 2 CH_{2}O + 2 H_{2}O

== Homogeneous catalytic routes ==
A variety of dehydrogenation processes have been described for organic compounds. These dehydrogenation is of interest in the synthesis of fine organic chemicals. Such reactions often rely on transition metal catalysts. Dehydrogenation of unfunctionalized alkanes can be effected by homogeneous catalysis. Especially active for this reaction are pincer complexes.

== Stoichiometric processes ==
Dehydrogenation of amines to nitriles can be accomplished using a variety of reagents, such as iodine pentafluoride (IF_{5}).

In typical aromatization, six-membered alicyclic rings, e.g. cyclohexene, can be aromatized in the presence of hydrogenation acceptors. The elements sulfur and selenium promote this process. On the laboratory scale, quinones, especially 2,3-dichloro-5,6-dicyano-1,4-benzoquinone (DDQ) are effective.

== Main group hydrides ==
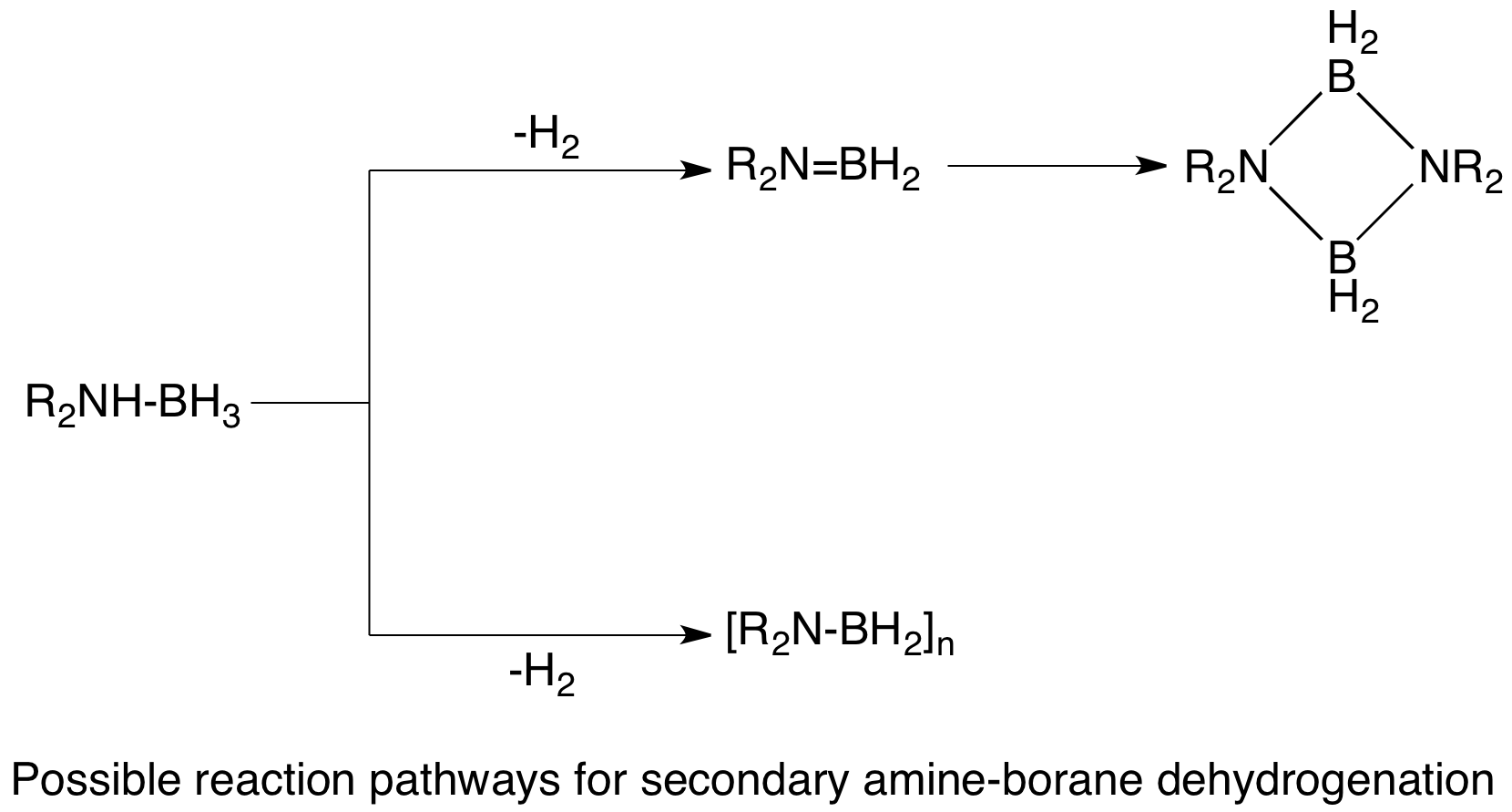
Dehydrogenation of ammonia borane.

The dehydrogenative coupling of silanes has also been developed.

n PhSiH_{3} → [PhSiH]_{n} + n H_{2}

The dehydrogenation of amine-boranes is related reaction. This process once gained interests for its potential for hydrogen storage.
