= Ammonia borane =

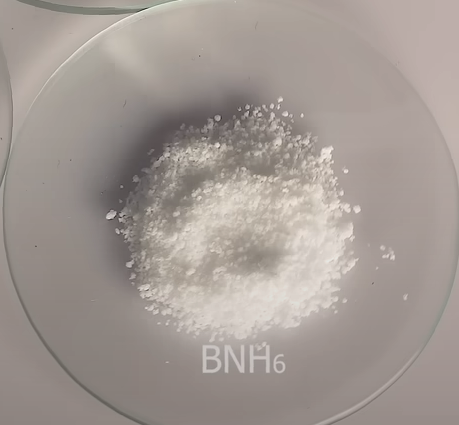

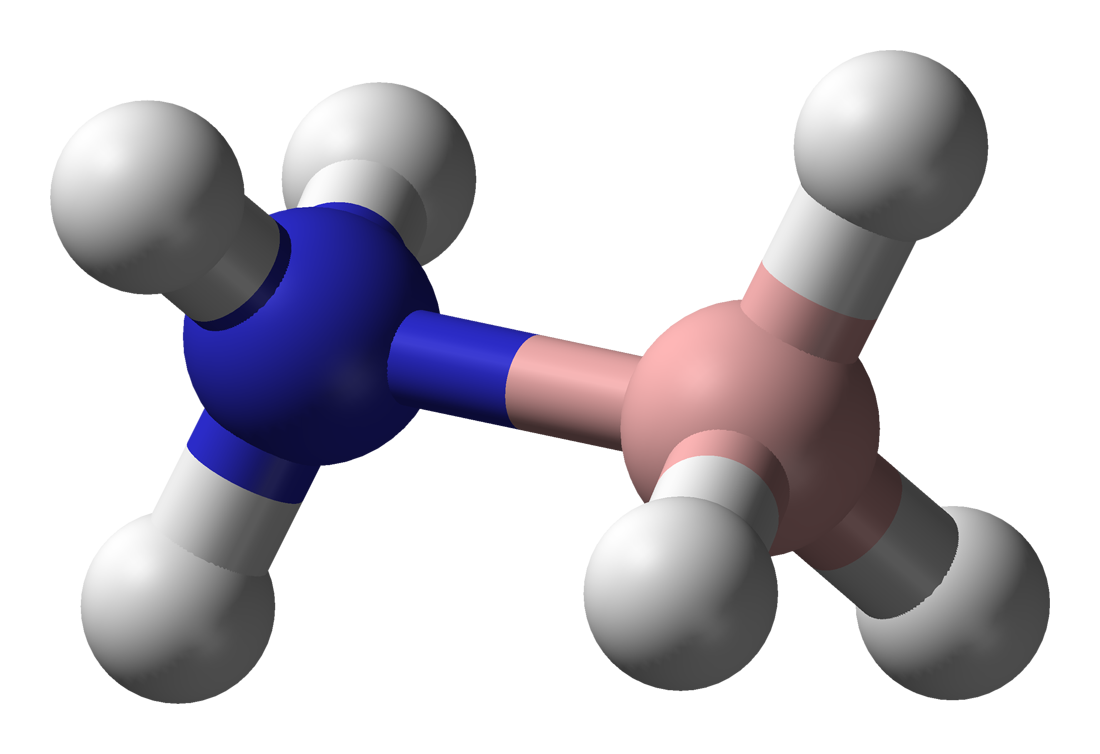
Ball-and-stick model of ammonia borane
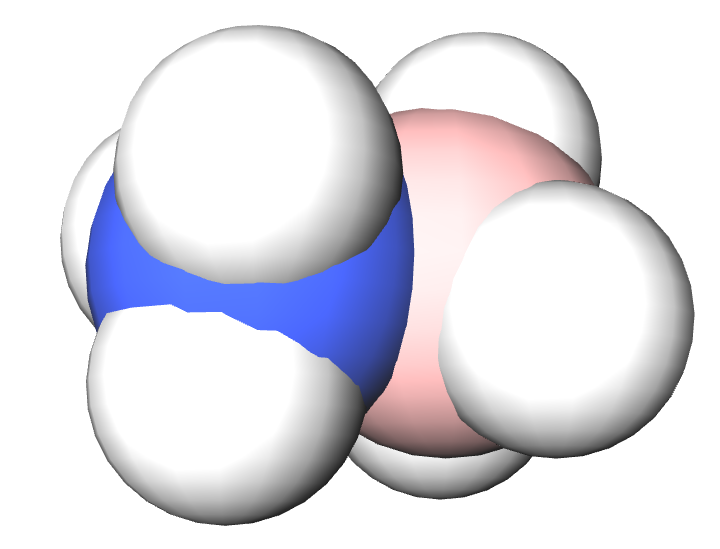

Names
- IUPAC name Ammonio(trihydrido)borate
- Other names Borazane

Identifiers
CAS Number	13774-81-7
3D model (JSmol)	Interactive image
ChemSpider	371215
ECHA InfoCard	100.170.890
EC Number	642-983-4
PubChem CID	132598553
UNII	XR7O5A5MH6
CompTox Dashboard (EPA)	DTXSID40422702
- InChI: InChI=1S/BH6N/c1-2/h1-2H3 Key: PJYXJGDRFASJSB-UHFFFAOYSA-N
- SMILES: [BH3-][NH3+]

Properties
Chemical formula	H_{3}NBH_{3}
Molar mass	30.87 g·mol^{−1}
Appearance	Colorless crystals
Density	0.78 g/cm^{3}
Melting point	104 °C (219 °F; 377 K)

Structure
Crystal structure	I4mm, tetragonal
Coordination geometry	Tetragonal at B and N
Molecular shape	Tetrahedral at B and N
Dipole moment	5.2 D

Hazards
- GHS labelling
Pictograms	(GHS02: Flammable) (GHS07: Exclamation mark)
Signal word	Danger
Hazard statements	H228, H302, H315, H319, H332, H335
Precautionary statements	P210, P240, P241, P261, P264, P264+P265, P270, P271, P280, P301+P317, P302+P352, P304+P340, P305+P351+P338, P317, P319, P321, P330, P332+P317, P337+P317, P362+P364, P370+P378, P403+P233, P405, P501

Related compounds
Related compounds	Sodium borohydride; Borazine; Borane; Diborane; Ethane
- Except where otherwise noted, data are given for materials in their standard state (at 25 °C [77 °F], 100 kPa). verify (what is ?) Infobox references

Ammonia borane (also systematically named ammonio(trihydrido)borate), also called borazane, is the chemical compound with the formula H_{3}NBH_{3}. The colourless or white solid is the simplest molecular boron-nitrogen-hydride compound. It has been investigated as a storage medium for hydrogen fuel, but is otherwise primarily of academic interest.

== Synthesis ==
Reaction of diborane with ammonia mainly gives the diammoniate salt [H_{2}B(NH_{3})_{2}]^{+}[BH_{4}]^{−} (diammoniodihydroboronium tetrahydroborate). Ammonia borane is the main product when an adduct of borane is employed in place of diborane:

BH_{3}·THF + NH_{3} → BH_{3}·NH_{3} + THF

Ammonia borane can also be synthesized from the salt metathesis reaction between sodium borohydride and an ammonium salt:

(NH_{4})_{2}SO_{4} + 2 NaBH_{4} → BH_{3}·NH_{3} + Na_{2}SO_{4} + 2 H_{2}

The initially formed ammonium borohydride [NH_{4}]^{+}[BH_{4}]^{−} is unstable and dehydrogenates under ambient conditions to form ammonia borane. These processes are generally higher yielding and produce less boron-containing byproducts than those performed with borane or its adducts. The most common solvents used for this process are polar aprotic solvents such as tetrahydrofuran or 1,4-dioxane, in which both sodium borohydride and most ammonium salts are only weakly soluble. The presence of water or methanol can improve the solubility of the reagents and accelerate the process but competing hydrolysis or methanolysis of the intermediate leads to the undesirable formation of boric acid or trimethyl borate.

== Properties and structure ==
The molecule adopts a structure similar to that of ethane, with which it is isoelectronic. The B−N distance is 1.58(2) Å. The B−H and N−H distances are 1.15 and 0.96 Å, respectively. Its similarity to ethane is tenuous since ammonia borane is a solid and ethane is a gas: their melting points differing by 284 °C. This difference is consistent with the highly polar nature of ammonia borane with its coordinate covalent bond. The H atoms attached to boron are hydridic (negatively charged) and those attached to nitrogen are acidic (positively charged).

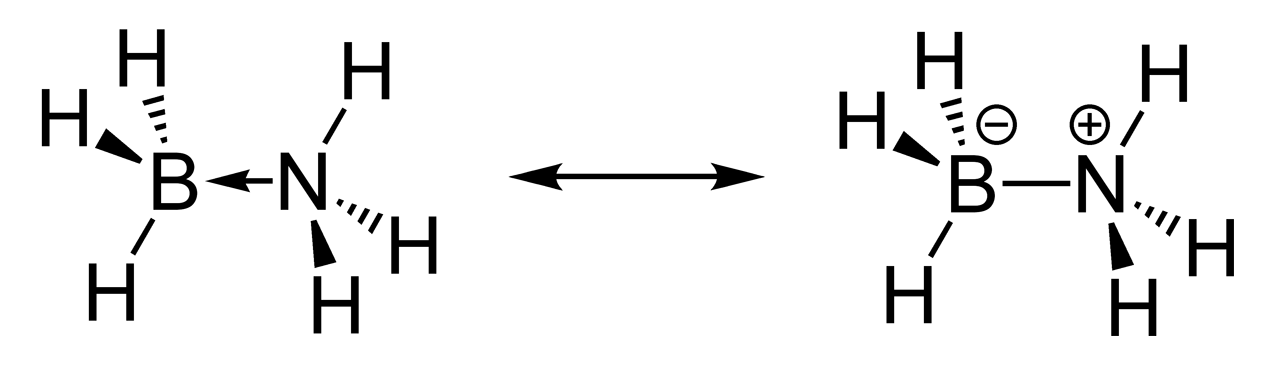
Resonance structures of ammonia-borane

The structure of the solid indicates a close association of the NH and the BH centers. The closest H−H distance is 1.990 Å, which can be compared with the H−H bonding distance of 0.74 Å. This interaction is called a dihydrogen bond. The original crystallographic analysis of this compound reversed the assignments of B and N. The updated structure was arrived at with improved data using the technique of neutron diffraction that allowed the hydrogen atoms to be located with greater precision.

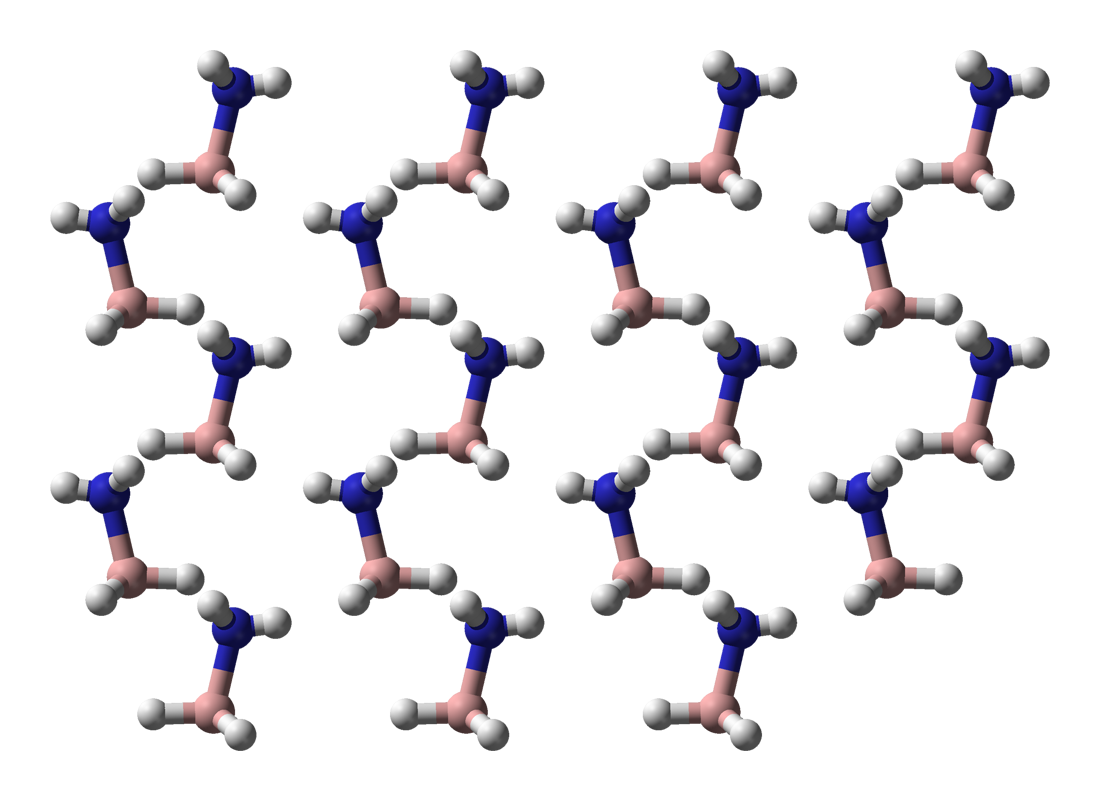
Part of the crystal structure of ammonia borane

Comparison of bond lengths in simple boron-nitrogen hydrides
Molecule	Ammonia borane	Aminoborane	Iminoborane
Formula	BNH_{6}	BNH_{4}	BNH_{2}
Class	amine-borane	aminoborane	iminoborane
Analogous hydrocarbon	ethane	ethylene	acetylene
Analogous hydrocarbon class	alkane	alkene	alkyne
Structure			
Ball-and-stick model			
Hybridisation of boron and nitrogen	sp^{3}	sp^{2}	sp
B-N bond length	1.658 Å	1.391 Å	1.238 Å
Proportion of B-N single bond	100%	84%	75%
Structure determination method	microwave spectroscopy	microwave spectroscopy	infrared spectroscopy

== Uses ==
Ammonia borane has been suggested as a storage medium for hydrogen, e.g. for when the gas is used to fuel motor vehicles. It can be made to release hydrogen on heating, being polymerized first to (NH_{2}BH_{2})_{n}, then to (NHBH)_{n}, which ultimately decomposes to boron nitride (BN) at temperatures above 1000 °C. It is more hydrogen-dense than liquid hydrogen and can exist at normal temperatures and pressures.

Ammonia borane finds some use in organic synthesis as an air-stable derivative of diborane. It can be used as a reducing agent in transfer hydrogenation reactions, often in the presence of a transition metal catalyst.

== Analogous amine-boranes ==
Many analogues have been prepared from primary, secondary, and even tertiary amines:

- Borane tert-butylamine ((CH_{3})_{3}C−NH_{2}→BH_{3})
- Borane trimethylamine ((CH_{3})_{3}N→BH_{3})
- Borane isopropylamine ((CH_{3})_{2}CH−NH_{2}→BH_{3})

The first amine adduct of borane was derived from trimethylamine. Borane tert-butylamine complex is prepared by the reaction of sodium borohydride with t-butylammonium chloride. Generally adducts are more robust with more basic amines. Variations are also possible for the boron component, although primary and secondary boranes are less common.

== See also ==
- Tert-butylamine borane (tBuNH_{2}→BH_{3})
- Phosphine-borane (R_{3}P→BH_{3})
- Borane dimethylsulfide ((CH_{3})_{2}S→BH_{3})
- Borane–tetrahydrofuran (THF→BH_{3})
