= Iminoborane =

Class of chemical compounds

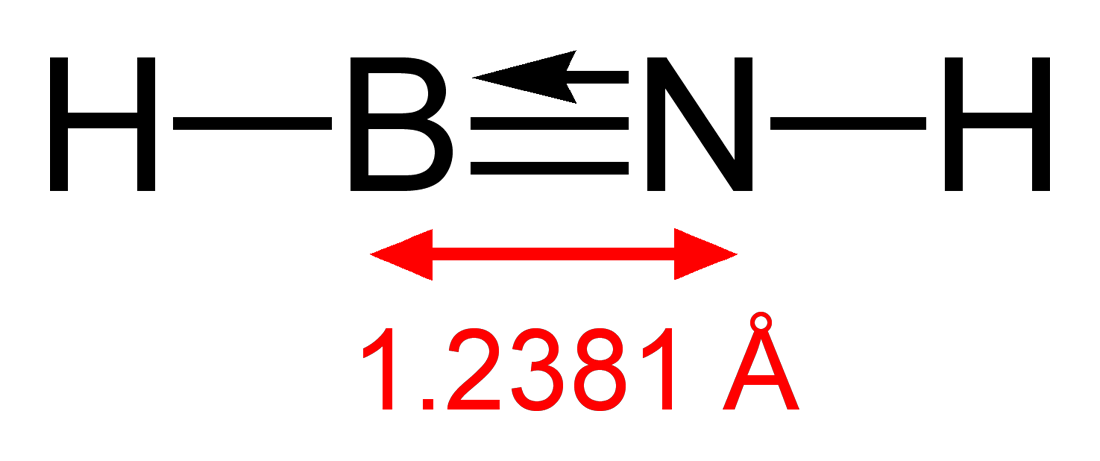
- Iminoborane (parent compound)

Names
- Other names Boraneimine

Identifiers
CAS Number	R,R'=H: 15119-97-8 (HB=NH)
3D model (JSmol)	R,R'=H: Interactive image
PubChem CID	R,R'=H: 102382766
- InChI: R,R'=H: InChI=1S/BH2N/c1-2/h1-2H Key: LNLSXDSWJBUPHM-UHFFFAOYSA-N
- SMILES: R,R'=H: B=N

Properties
Chemical formula	BH_{2}N
Molar mass	26.83 g·mol^{−1}

Related compounds
Related compounds	Acetylene; Ammonia borane; Aminoborane
- Except where otherwise noted, data are given for materials in their standard state (at 25 °C [77 °F], 100 kPa). Infobox references

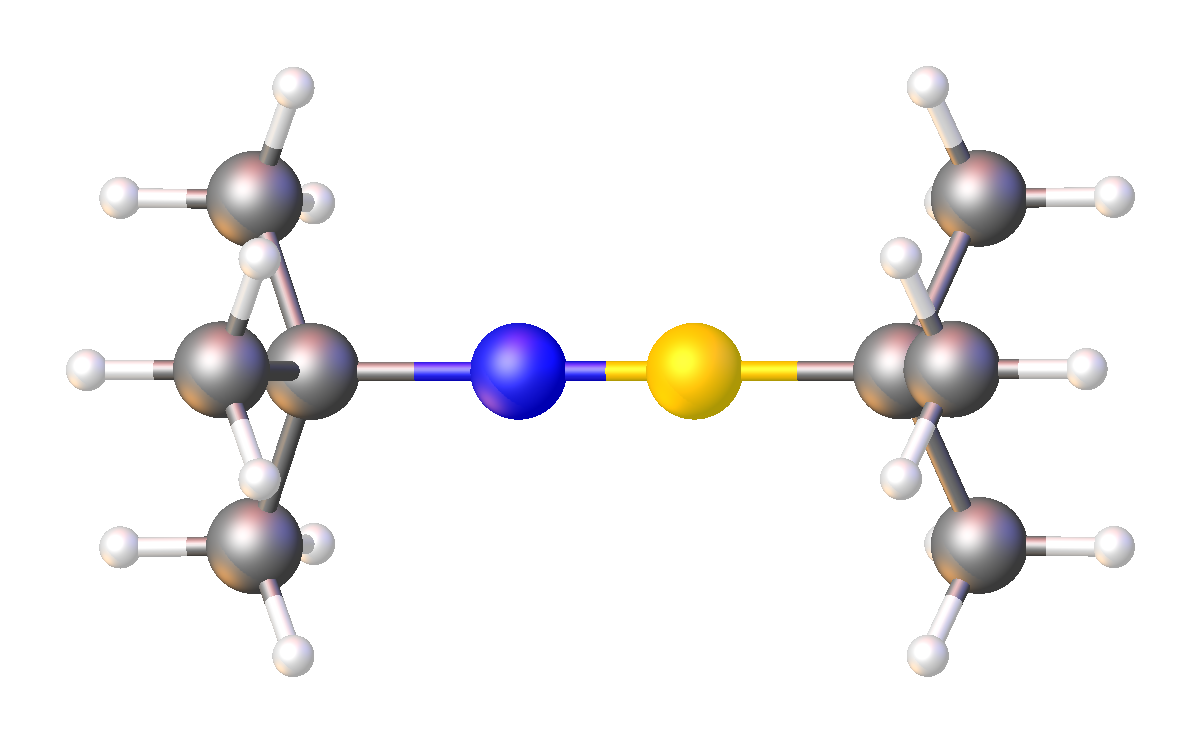
Structure of tBuN=B-tBu (tBu = tert-butyl). The B-N bond distance is 126 pm.

Iminoboranes comprise a group of organoboron compounds with the formula RB=NR'. They are electronically related to acetylenes, but are usually more reactive due to the polarity.

== Structure and bonding ==
The parent iminoborane, HB=NH, is produced by the photolysis of H_{3}BNH_{3}. Bonding in iminoboranes can be described by two resonance structures:

$$\ce{R-\overset{\ominus}{B}{\equiv}\overset{\oplus}{N}-R <-> R-B=\ddot{N}-R}$$

Bulky substituents, such as tert-butyl, can dramatically enhance stability. One isolable iminoborane is (CH_{3})_{3}C−B^{−}≡N^{+}−C(CH_{3})_{3}.

Comparison of bond lengths in simple boron-nitrogen hydrides
Molecule	Ammonia borane	Aminoborane	Iminoborane
Formula	BNH_{6}	BNH_{4}	BNH_{2}
Class	amine-borane	aminoborane	iminoborane
Analogous hydrocarbon	ethane	ethylene	acetylene
Analogous hydrocarbon class	alkane	alkene	alkyne
Structure			
Ball-and-stick model			
Hybridisation of boron and nitrogen	sp^{3}	sp^{2}	sp
B-N bond length	1.658 Å	1.391 Å	1.238 Å
Proportion of B-N single bond	100%	84%	75%
B-H bond length	1.216 Å	1.195 Å	
N-H bond length	1.014 Å	1.004 Å	
Structure determination method	microwave spectroscopy	microwave spectroscopy	infrared spectroscopy

== Synthesis ==
Elimination of fluoro- or chlorosilanes provides a well-tested route. Bulky substituents such as (Me_{3}Si)_{3}Si stabilize the iminoborane with respect to oligomerization:

(Me_{3}Si)_{3}SiB(F)−N(SiMe_{3})_{2} → (Me_{3}Si)_{3}Si−B=N−SiMe_{3} + F−SiMe_{3}

Thermal decomposition of azidoboranes induces migration of R from boron to the nascent nitrene gives iminoboranes:

R_{2}B−N_{3} → RB=NR + N_{2}

== Reactivity ==
=== Oligomerization ===
Iminoboranes tend to oligomerize, often forming cyclic derivatives. Bulky substituents can prevent this reaction. Five types of oligomerization product are produced: cyclodimers (1,3-diaza-2,4-diboretidines, Di), cyclotrimers (borazines, Tr), bicyclotrimers (Dewar borazines, Tr′), cyclotetramers (octahydro-1,3,5,7-tetraza-2,4,6,8-tetraborocines, Te), and polymers (polyiminoboranes, Po); which are shown below. Which product is dominant depends on the structures of reactants and the reaction conditions. Some of the products can be interconverted.

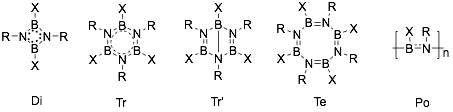

=== Addition reactions ===
The addition of protic agents is fast and quantitive. Boration reaction of iminoboranes is the addition of B-X single bond to B≡N, where -X can be -Cl (chloro-boration), -N_{3} (azido-boration), -SR (thio-boration), -NR2 (amino-boration) and R (alkyl-boration). One of these reactions are illustrated here.

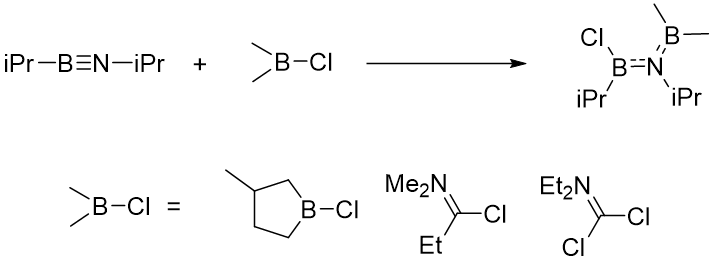

Some electron-rich iminoboranes form adducts with Lewis acids.

=== Cycloaddition ===
The typical [2+3]-cycloaddition is the addition of B≡N and RN_{3} to give a BN_{4} ring. One of the widely investigated [2+2]-cycloadditions is the reaction of aldehydes and ketones.

=== Coordination to transition metals ===
Like alkynes, iminoboranes bind transition metals.

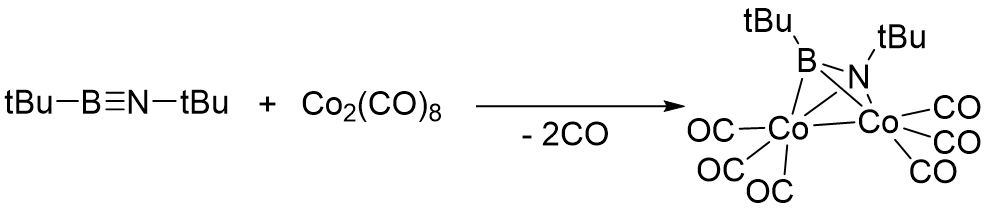
