= Borane–tetrahydrofuran =

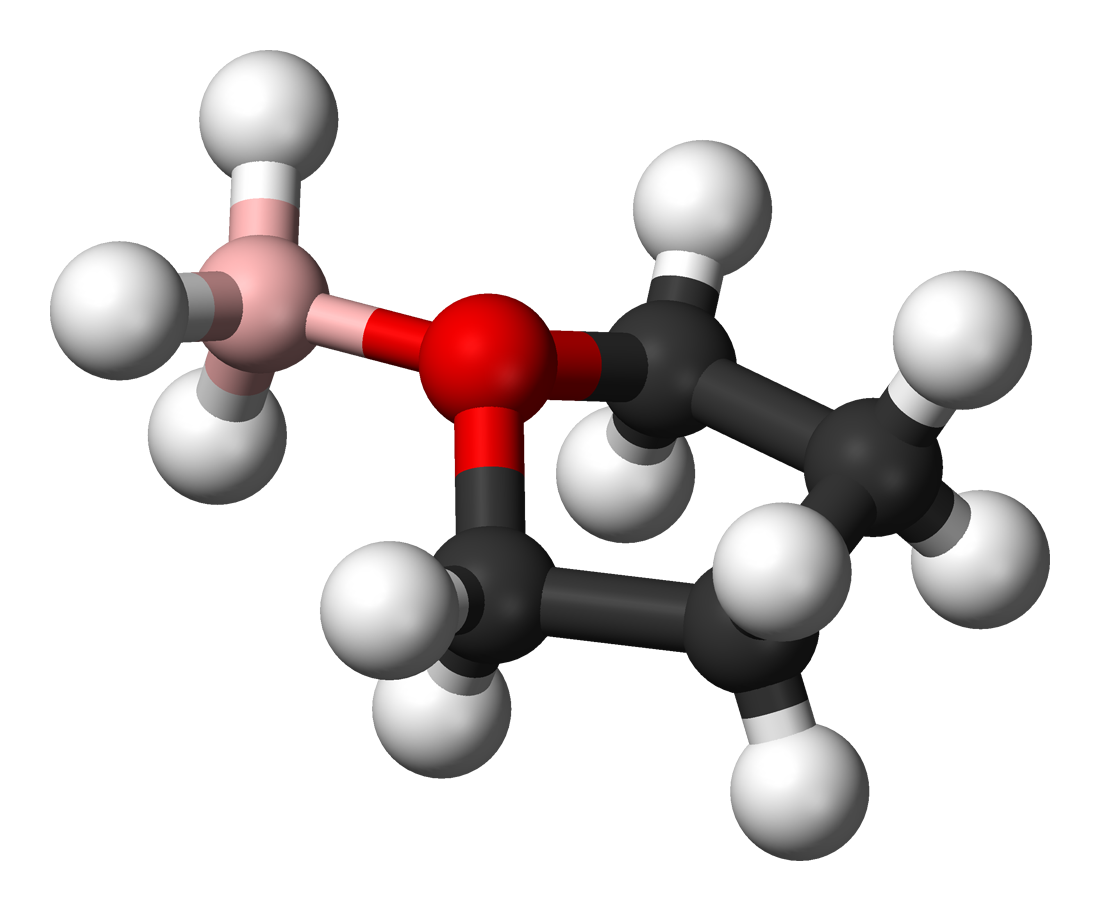

Identifiers
CAS Number	14044-65-6
3D model (JSmol)	Interactive image
ChemSpider	28533981
ECHA InfoCard	100.034.424
EC Number	237-881-8
PubChem CID	11062302
UNII	5EAR4ERR1L
CompTox Dashboard (EPA)	DTXSID50930823
- InChI: InChI=1S/C4H8O.B/c1-2-4-5-3-1;/h1-4H2; Key: UWTDFICHZKXYAC-UHFFFAOYSA-N
- SMILES: [BH3-][O+]1CCCC1

Properties
Chemical formula	C_{4}H_{11}BO
Molar mass	85.94 g·mol^{−1}
Appearance	White solid
Melting point	66 °C (151 °F; 339 K)

Hazards
- GHS labelling
Pictograms	(GHS02: Flammable) (GHS05: Corrosive) (GHS07: Exclamation mark)
Signal word	Danger
Hazard statements	H225, H260, H302, H315, H318, H319, H335
Precautionary statements	P210, P223, P231+P232, P233, P240, P241, P242, P243, P261, P264, P270, P271, P280, P301+P312, P302+P352, P303+P361+P353, P304+P340, P305+P351+P338, P310, P312, P321, P330, P332+P313, P335+P334, P337+P313, P362, P370+P378, P402+P404, P403+P233, P403+P235, P405, P501
Flash point	−17 °C (1 °F; 256 K)
- Except where otherwise noted, data are given for materials in their standard state (at 25 °C [77 °F], 100 kPa). Infobox references

Borane–tetrahydrofuran is an adduct derived from borane and tetrahydrofuran (THF). These solutions, which are colorless, are used for reductions and hydroboration, reactions that are useful in synthesis of organic compounds. A common alternative to BH_{3}•THF is borane–dimethylsulfide, which has a longer shelf life and effects similar transformations.

== Preparation and uses ==
The complex is commercially available but can also be generated by the dissolution of diborane in THF. Alternatively, it can be prepared by the oxidation of sodium borohydride with iodine in THF.

The complex can reduce carboxylic acids to alcohols and is a common route for the reduction of amino acids to amino alcohols (e.g. valinol). It adds across alkenes to give organoboron compounds that are useful intermediates. The following organoboron reagents are prepared from borane-THF: 9-borabicyclo[3.3.1]nonane, Alpine borane, diisopinocampheylborane. It is also used as a source of borane (BH_{3}) for the formation of adducts.

== Safety ==
The solution is highly sensitive to air, requiring the use of air-free techniques.

== See also ==
- Ammonia borane
- Borane dimethylsulfide
- Borane tert-butylamine
