= Hydroboration =

Addition of a hydrogen-boron bond to C=C, C=N, C=O, or C≡C bonds

In organic chemistry, hydroboration refers to the addition of a hydrogen-boron bond to certain double and triple bonds involving carbon (C=C, C=N, C=O, and C≡C). This chemical reaction is useful in the organic synthesis of organic compounds.

Hydroboration produces organoborane compounds that react with a variety of reagents to produce useful compounds, such as alcohols, amines, or alkyl halides. The most widely known reaction of the organoboranes is oxidation to produce alcohols from alkenes.

The development of this technology and the underlying concepts were recognized by the Nobel Prize in Chemistry to Herbert C. Brown.

== Borane adducts ==
Borane dimethylsulfide (BMS) is a complexed borane reagent that is widely used for hydroborations.

Much of the original work on hydroboration employed diborane as a source of BH_{3}. Usually however, borane dimethylsulfide complex BH_{3}S(CH_{3})_{2} (BMS) is used instead. It can be obtained in highly concentrated forms.

The adduct BH_{3}(THF) is also commercially available as THF solutions. Its shelf life is less than BMS.

In terms of synthetic results, diborane or the more convenient BMS and borane-THF are equivalent.

== Of alkenes ==
The stoichiometry and idealized regiochemistry of hydroboration of terminal alkenes follows:

BH_{3} + 3 RCH=CH_{2} → B(CH_{2}−CH_{2}R)_{3}

Hydroboration is typically anti-Markovnikov, meaning the hydrogen adds to the most substituted carbon of the double bond. About 4% of each addition is Markovnikov (affording the B(CH(CH3)R isomer). The orientation opposite a typical HX addition reflects the B^{δ+}-H^{δ−} bond polarity. Correspondingly, substituted styrenes react placing boron at the benzyl.

Steric hindrance has almost no effect on regiochemistry: alkenes with differently-sized 1,2-substituents still produce roughly 50-50 mixtures of both possible products. It does, however, affect whether the reaction goes to completion, replacing all three hydrides in BH_{3}. With tri- or tetra-substituted alkenes, hydroboration only proceeds twice, affording HB(CR_{2}−CHR'R")_{2}. This significant rate difference is useful for the production of bulky borane chiral auxiliaries for asymmetric reduction.

Hydroboration proceeds through a four-membered transition state: the hydrogen and the boron atoms added on the same face of the double bond. Granted that the mechanism is concerted, the formation of the C-B bond proceeds slightly faster than the formation of the C-H bond. As a result, in the transition state, boron develops a partially negative charge while the more substituted carbon bears a partially positive charge. This partial positive charge is better supported by the more substituted carbon. Formally, the reaction is an example of a group transfer reaction. However, an analysis of the orbitals involved reveals that the reaction is 'pseudopericyclic' and not subject to the Woodward–Hoffmann rules for pericyclic reactivity.

Hydroboration of a terminal alkene to a trialkylborane, showing idealized image of the cyclic transition state.

== Of alkynes ==
Hydroboration of alkynes gives alkenylboranes. The stereochemistry is cis. With terminal alkynes, both H_{2}BCH=HR and HB(CH=CHR)_{2} are formed. Often the hydroboration of alkynes use bulky boranes such as 9-BBN to give monoalkenylborane products. The alkenylboranes are susceptible to many reactions such as protonolysis to give the alkene and oxidation to give the aldehyde or ketone.

== Specialty boranes ==
Thexylborane [Me_{2}CHCMe_{2}BH_{2}]_{2} (Me = methyl) is a rare, easily accessed monoalkylborane.

One example of a monoalkylborane is thexylborane (ThxBH_{2}), produced by the hydroboration of tetramethylethylene:

B_{2}H_{6} + 2 Me_{2}C=CMe_{2} → [Me_{2}CHCMe_{2}BH_{2}]_{2}

A chiral example is monoisopinocampheylborane. Although often written as IpcBH_{2}, it is a dimer [IpcBH_{2}]_{2}. It is obtained by hydroboration of (−)‐α‐pinene with borane dimethyl sulfide.

Monobromo- and monochloro-borane can be prepared from BMS and the corresponding boron trihalides. The stable complex of monochloroborane and 1,4-dioxane effects hydroboration of terminal alkenes.

Prominent among hindered dialkylboranes is disiamylborane, abbreviated Sia_{2}BH. It also is a dimer. Owing to its steric bulk, it selectively hydroborates less hindered, usually terminal alkenes in the presence of more substituted alkenes. Disiamylborane must be freshly prepared as its solutions can only be stored at 0 °C for a few hours. Dicyclohexylborane Chx_{2}BH exhibits improved thermal stability than Sia_{2}BH.

A versatile dialkylborane is 9-BBN. Also called "banana borane", it exists as a dimer. Reactions with 9-BBN typically occur at 60–80 °C, with most alkenes reacting within one hour. Tetrasubstituted alkenes add 9-BBN at elevated temperature. Hydroboration of alkenes with 9-BBN proceeds with excellent regioselectivity. It is more sensitive to steric differences than Sia_{2}BH, perhaps because of it rigid C_{8} backbone. 9-BBN is more reactive towards alkenes than alkynes.

For catalytic hydroboration, pinacolborane and catecholborane are widely used. They also exhibit higher reactivity toward alkynes. Pinacolborane is also widely used in a catalyst-free hydroborations.

== See also ==
- Hydroboration-oxidation
- Carboboration
- metal-catalysed hydroboration
