= Borane carbonyl =

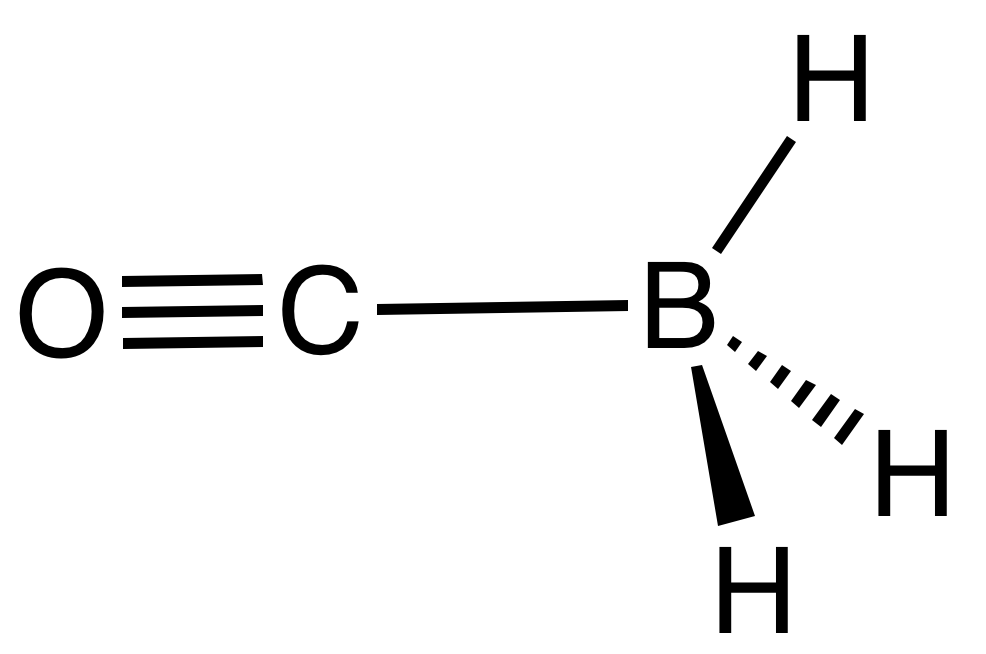

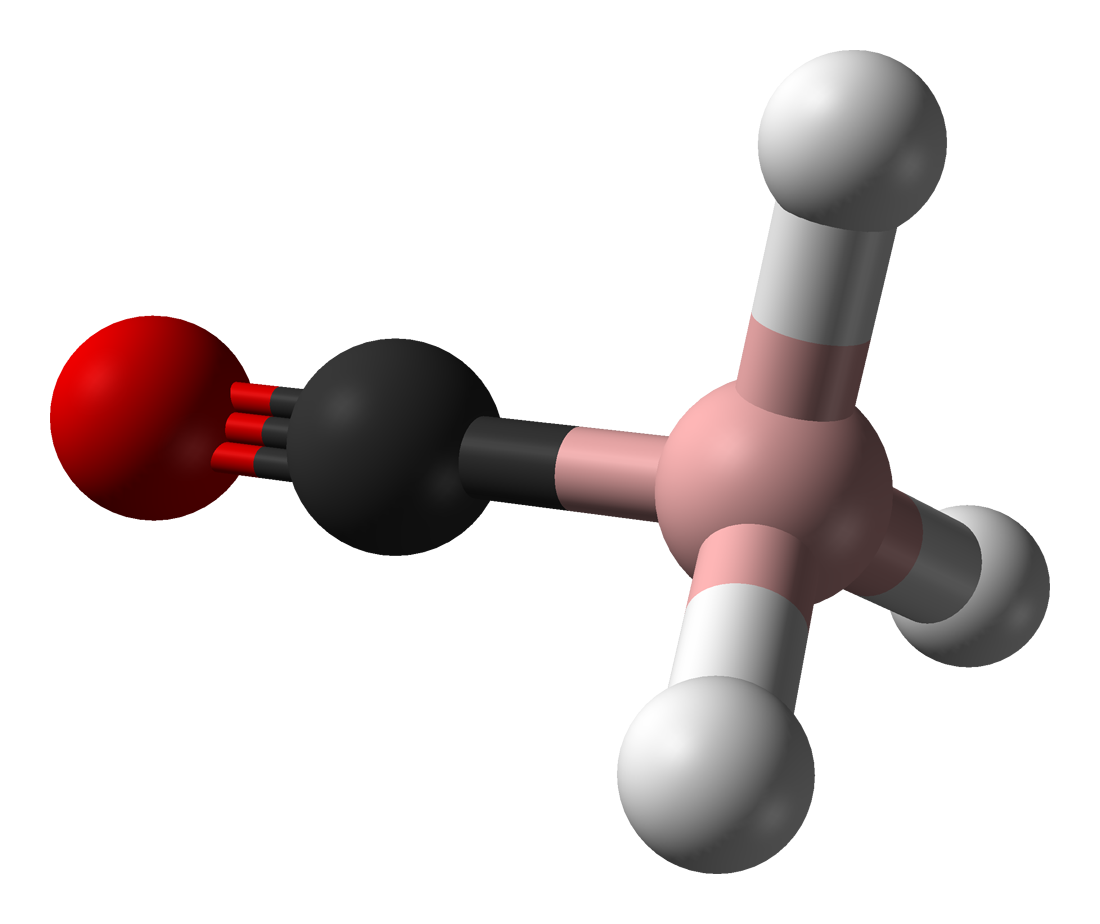

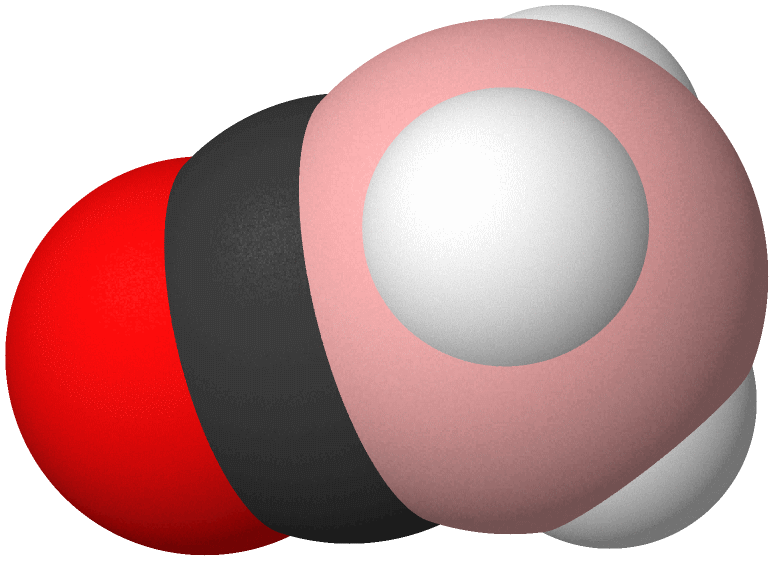

Names
- IUPAC name Borane carbonyl
- Systematic IUPAC name Carbonyl(trihydrido)borate
- Other names: BH3CO; Borane-carbon monoxide (1:1); Borane, compd. with carbon monoxide (1:1); Borine carbonyl; Boron, carbonyltrihydro; Boron, carbonyltrihydro-, (T-4)-; Carbon monoxide-borane; Carbonyltrihydroboron

Identifiers
CAS Number	13205-44-2
3D model (JSmol)	Interactive image
ChemSpider	10225684
PubChem CID	13212226
CompTox Dashboard (EPA)	DTXSID201337204
- InChI: InChI=1S/CO.BH3/c1-2;/h;1H3 Key: SJGVUIMZYFHURU-UHFFFAOYSA-N
- SMILES: [BH3-]C#[O+]

Properties
Chemical formula	H_{3}BCO
Molar mass	41.84 g·mol^{−1}
Appearance	colorless gas
Density	1.71 g/L
Melting point	−137 °C (−215 °F; 136 K)
Boiling point	−64 °C (−83 °F; 209 K)
- Except where otherwise noted, data are given for materials in their standard state (at 25 °C [77 °F], 100 kPa). Infobox references

Borane carbonyl is the inorganic compound with the formula H_{3}BCO. This colorless gas is the adduct of borane and carbon monoxide. It is usually prepared by combining borane-ether complexes and CO. The compound is mainly of theoretical and pedagogical interest.

== Structure and properties ==
The structure of the molecule of borane carbonyl is H_{3}B^{−}−C≡O^{+}. The B−C≡O linkage is linear. The coordination geometry around the boron atom is tetrahedral. The bond distances are 114.0 pm for the C≡O bond, 152.9 pm for the C−B bond, and 119.4 pm for the B−H bonds. The H−B−H bond angle is 113.7°. The C≡O vibrational band is at 2164.7 cm^{−1}, around 22 cm^{−1} higher than that of free CO.

Borane carbonyl has an enthalpy of vaporization of 19.7 kJ/mol (4750 cal/mol). It has electronic state ^{1}A_{1} and point group symmetry C_{3v}.

== Synthesis and reactions ==
Borane carbonyl was discovered in 1937 by reacting diborane with excess carbon monoxide, with the equation:

B_{2}H_{6} + 2 CO ⇌ 2 BH_{3}CO.

The reaction quickly reaches equilibrium at 100°C, but at room temperature, the reverse reaction is slow enough to isolate borane carbonyl. This reaction is performed at high pressures, typically with a maximum pressure observed of 1000 to 1600 psi (68.95 to 110.32 bar). It can also be performed at atmospheric pressure, with ethers as a catalyst.

A more recent synthesis of borane carbonyl involves slowly bubbling carbon monoxide through a 1 M H_{3}B−THF solution. The resulting gas stream can be condensed and subsequently bubbled through ethanolic potassium hydroxide to produce the boranocarbonate anion ([H_{3}BCO_{2}]^{2−} or H_{3}B^{−}−CO^{−}_{2}).
