= Borane tert-butylamine =

Names
- IUPAC name Trihydrido(2-methylpropan-2-aminio)borate
- Other names tert-Butylamine borane; Trihydro(2-methyl-2-propanamine) boron

Identifiers
CAS Number	7337-45-3
3D model (JSmol)	Interactive image
ChemSpider	451414
EC Number	230-851-5
PubChem CID	6364547
- InChI: InChI=1S/C4H11N.BH3/c1-4(2,3)5;/h5H2,1-3H3;1H3 Key: GKFJEDWZQZKYHV-UHFFFAOYSA-N
- SMILES: NC(C)(C)C.B

Properties
Chemical formula	C_{4}H_{14}BN
Molar mass	86.97 g·mol^{−1}
Appearance	White solid
Melting point	96 °C (205 °F; 369 K)
- Except where otherwise noted, data are given for materials in their standard state (at 25 °C [77 °F], 100 kPa). Infobox references

Borane tert-butylamine is an amine borane complex derived from tert-butylamine and borane. It is a colorless solid.

The compound is prepared by the reaction of tert-butylammonium chloride and sodium borohydride:

t-BuNH_{3}Cl + NaBH_{4} → t-BuNH_{2}BH_{3} + H_{2} + NaCl

In organic synthesis, borane tert-butylamine can be used for selective reduction of certain functional groups including aldehydes, ketones, oximes, and imines.

In photographic processing, it is used in the E-4 process, as "chemical enlighting" step in the processing of the film.

== See also ==
- Ammonia borane
