= Tetramethylethylene =

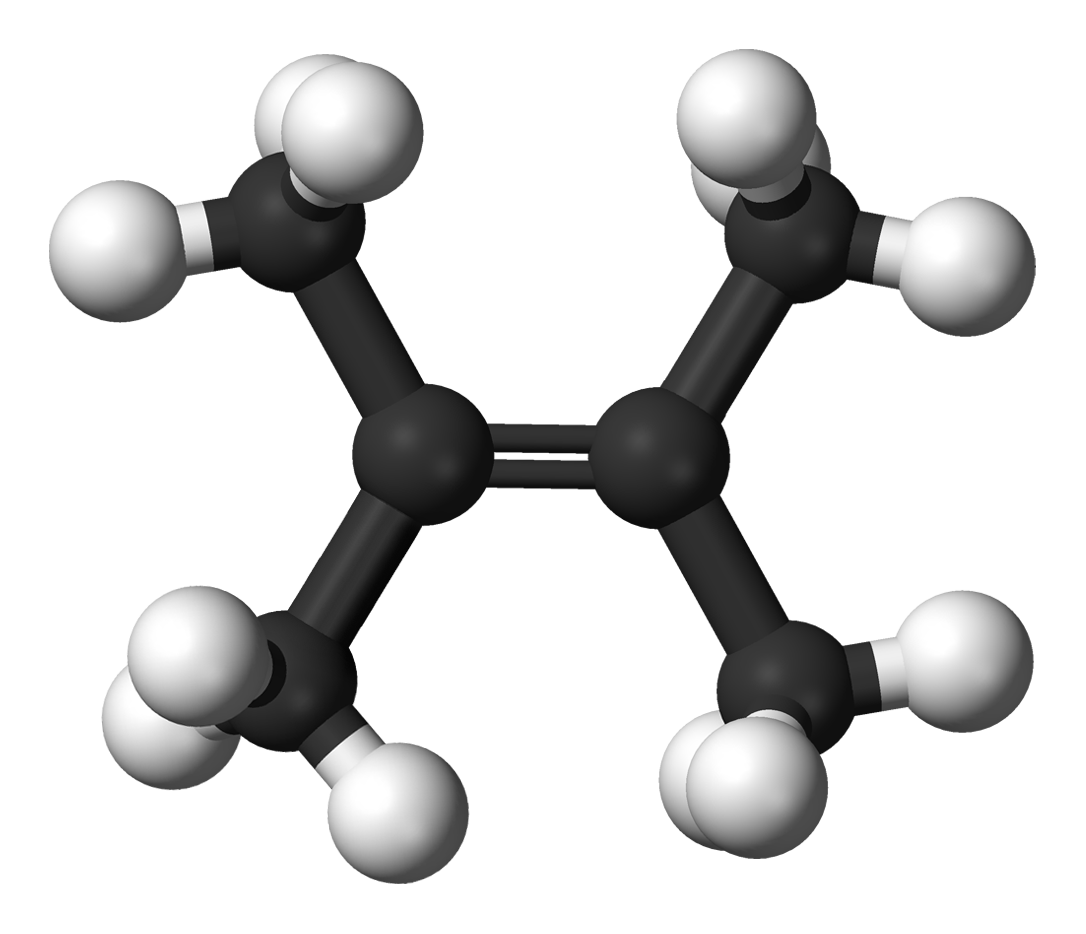

Names
- Preferred IUPAC name 2,3-Dimethylbut-2-ene

Identifiers
CAS Number	563-79-1
3D model (JSmol)	Interactive image
ChemSpider	10776
ECHA InfoCard	100.008.422
EC Number	209-263-8
PubChem CID	11250
UNII	7UQ4B3F5JC
CompTox Dashboard (EPA)	DTXSID2060339
- InChI: InChI=1S/C6H12/c1-5(2)6(3)4/h1-4H3 Key: WGLLSSPDPJPLOR-UHFFFAOYSA-N
- SMILES: CC(=C(C)C)C

Properties
Chemical formula	C_{6}H_{12}
Molar mass	84.162 g·mol^{−1}
Appearance	Colorless liquid
Density	0.7075 g/cm^{3} (20 °C)
Melting point	−74.6 °C (−102.3 °F; 198.6 K)
Boiling point	73.3 °C (163.9 °F; 346.4 K)
Critical point (T, P)	521.0(9) K, 3.4(1) MPa
Solubility in water	Insoluble
Solubility	Soluble in ethanol, ether, acetone, chloroform
Magnetic susceptibility (χ)	−65.9×10^{−6} cm^{3}·mol^{−1}
Refractive index (n_{D})	1.4122 (20 °C)

Thermochemistry
Heat capacity (C)	174.7 J·mol^{−1}·K^{−1}
Std molar entropy (S^{⦵}_{298})	270.2 J·mol^{−1}·K^{−1}
Std enthalpy of formation (Δ_{f}H^{⦵}_{298})	−101.4 kJ·mol^{−1} (liquid) −68.1 kJ·mol^{−1} (gas)
Enthalpy of fusion (Δ_{f}H^{⦵}_{fus})	6.45 kJ·mol^{−1} (at melting point)
Enthalpy of vaporization (Δ_{f}H_{vap})	32.51 kJ·mol^{−1} (25 °C); 29.64 kJ·mol^{−1} (at boiling point)

Hazards
- GHS labelling
Pictograms	(GHS02: Flammable) (GHS08: Health hazard)
Signal word	Danger
Hazard statements	H225, H304
Precautionary statements	P210, P233, P240, P241, P242, P243, P280, P301+P310, P303+P361+P353, P331, P370+P378, P403+P235, P405, P501
Flash point	−8 °C
Autoignition temperature	401 °C
- Except where otherwise noted, data are given for materials in their standard state (at 25 °C [77 °F], 100 kPa). Infobox references

Tetramethylethylene (2,3-dimethylbut-2-ene) is a hydrocarbon with the formula Me_{2}C=CMe_{2} (Me = methyl). A colorless liquid, it is the simplest tetrasubstituted alkene.

== Synthesis ==
Tetramethylethylene can be prepared by base-catalyzed isomerization of 2,3-dimethyl-1-butene. Another route involves direct dimerization of propylene. It can also be produced by photolysis of tetramethylcyclobutane-1,3-dione.

== Reactions ==
Tetramethylethylene forms metal-alkene complexes with low-valent metals and reacts with diborane to give the monoalkyborane known as thexylborane.

Oxidation gives pinacol.

It is a precursor to the herbicide fenpropathrin.
