= Alpine borane =

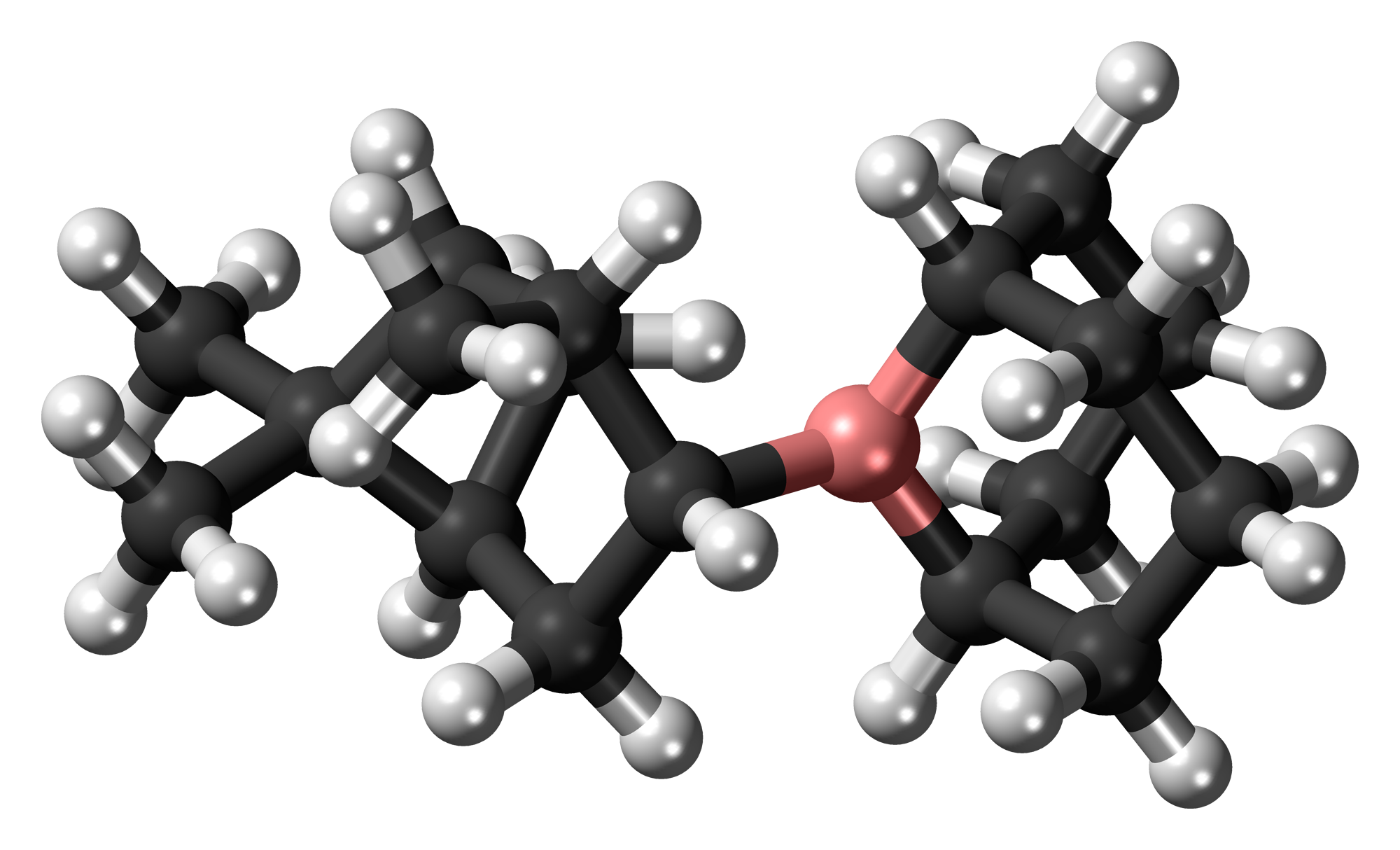

Names
- IUPAC name 9-(2,6,6-Trimethylbicyclo[3.1.1]hept-3-yl)-9-bora-bicyclo[3.3.1]nonane
- Other names Alpine-Borane; B-Isopinocampheyl-9-borabicyclo[3.3.1]nonane; B-3-Pinanyl-9-borabicyclo[3.3.1]nonane

Identifiers
| CAS Number | 73624-47-2 (R isomer); 42371-63-1 (S isomer) |
| 3D model (JSmol) | Interactive image |
| ChemSpider | 17206399 |
| ECHA InfoCard | 100.157.575 |
| PubChem CID | 9921373 R; 10890567 S |
| CompTox Dashboard (EPA) | DTXSID50432857 |
- InChI: InChI=1S/C18H31B/c1-12-16-10-13(18(16,2)3)11-17(12)19-14-6-4-7-15(19)9-5-8-14/h12-17H,4-11H2,1-3H3/t12-,13-,14?,15?,16+,17-/m1/s1 Key: VCDGSBJCRYTLNU-AZWGFFAPSA-N; InChI=1/C18H31B/c1-12-16-10-13(18(16,2)3)11-17(12)19-14-6-4-7-15(19)9-5-8-14/h12-17H,4-11H2,1-3H3/t12-,13-,14?,15?,16+,17-/m1/s1 Key: VCDGSBJCRYTLNU-AZWGFFAPBY
- SMILES: CC4(C)[C@@H]1C[C@H]4[C@@H](C)[C@@H](C1)B3C2CCCC3CCC2

Properties
| Chemical formula | C_{18}H_{31}B |
| Molar mass | 258.26 g·mol^{−1} |
| Appearance | Colorless liquid |
| Density | 0.947 g/mL |
| Boiling point | > 55 °C (131 °F; 328 K) |

Hazards
- GHS labelling
| Pictograms | (GHS02: Flammable) |
| Signal word | Danger |
| Hazard statements | H250 |
| Precautionary statements | P210, P222, P280, P302+P334, P370+P378, P422 |
- Except where otherwise noted, data are given for materials in their standard state (at 25 °C [77 °F], 100 kPa). verify (what is ?) Infobox references

Alpine borane is the commercial name for an organoboron compound used in organic synthesis. It is a colorless liquid, which is usually encountered as a solution. A range of alkyl-substituted boranes are specialty reagents in organic synthesis. Two such reagents closely related to Alpine borane are 9-BBN and diisopinocampheylborane.

== Preparation and reactions ==
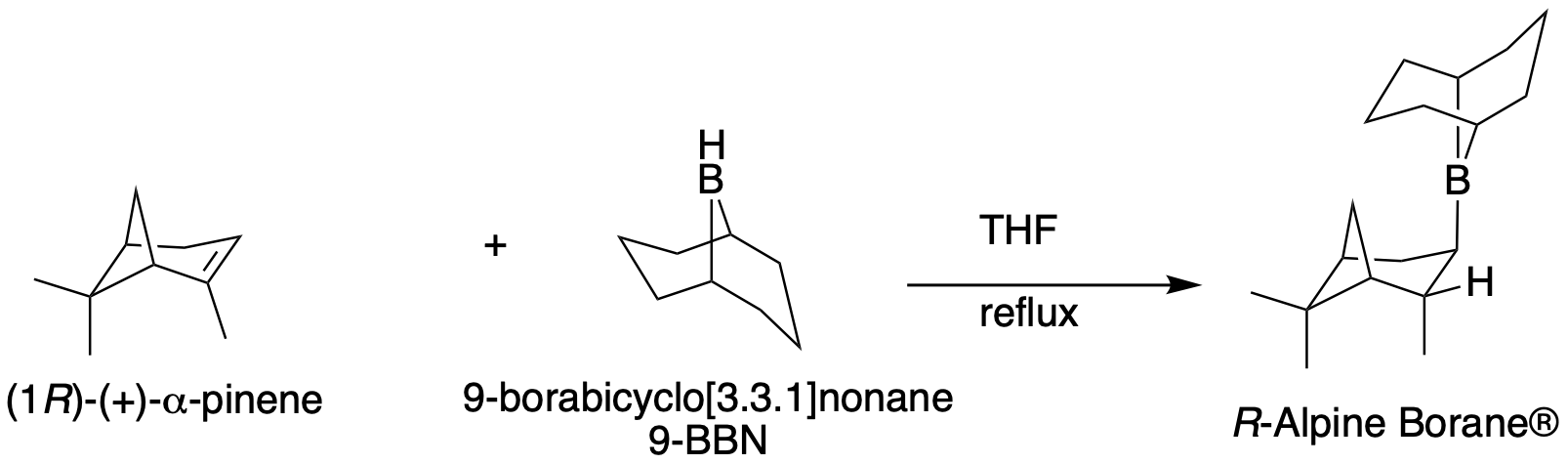

This reagent is generated by treating 9-BBN with α-pinene.

This sterically crowded chiral trialkylborane can stereoselectively reduce aldehydes in what is known as the Midland Alpine borane reduction, or simply the Midland reduction.

C_{8}H_{12}B-pinanyl + RCDO → C_{8}H_{12}BOCHDR + (+)-d-pinene

Hydrolysis of the resulting borinic ester affords the alcohol:

C_{8}H_{12}BOCHDR + H_{2}O → C_{8}H_{12}BOH + HOCHDR

It is also effective for the stereoselective reduction of certain acetylenic ketones. The reaction proposed involves forming an adduct by coordinating the carbonyl oxygen to boron. Intramolecular hydride transfer from the pinane substituent to the carbonyl carbon ensues. Many substrates for the Midland reduction have a low steric group, such as an alkyne or a nitrile, to increase selectivity. Stereochemical control comes from the coordination of the carbonyl bulky borane, followed by hydride transfer opposite the largest group.

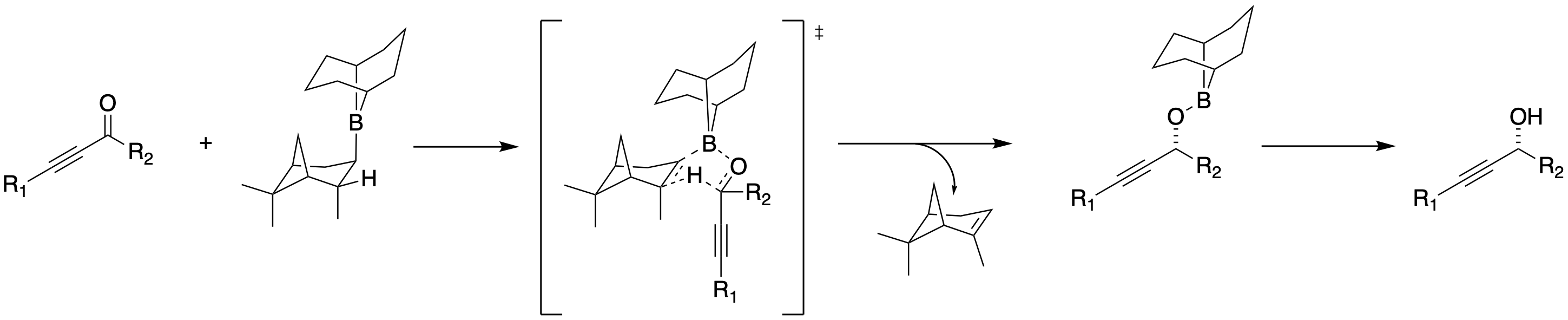

== See also ==
- Corey-Itsuno reduction
- Asymmetric hydrogenation
