= Amine-boranes =

Amine-boranes are a class of covalent compounds based on the ammonia borane parent structure. These compounds were once of some interest for hydrogen storage, as they can undergo dehydrogenation (dehydrocoupling) to release dihydrogen.

== Substrates ==
Ammonia-borane, the parent amine-borane, is a molecule with the formula H_{3}B−NH_{3}. The hydrogen content for double dehydrogenation of ammonia-borane is 13% ((4/30.9)x100):

H_{3}B−NH_{3} → 2 H_{2} + (HBNH)

The amine boranes have the formula H_{3}B−NH_{2}R where R = alkyl. Their hydrogen content is necessarily lower, but the dehydrogenated product is more processable.

== Catalysis ==
Many metal complexes catalyze the dehydrogenation of amine-borane (AB). Catalysis in the absence of metals has also been observed.

=== Pathways ===
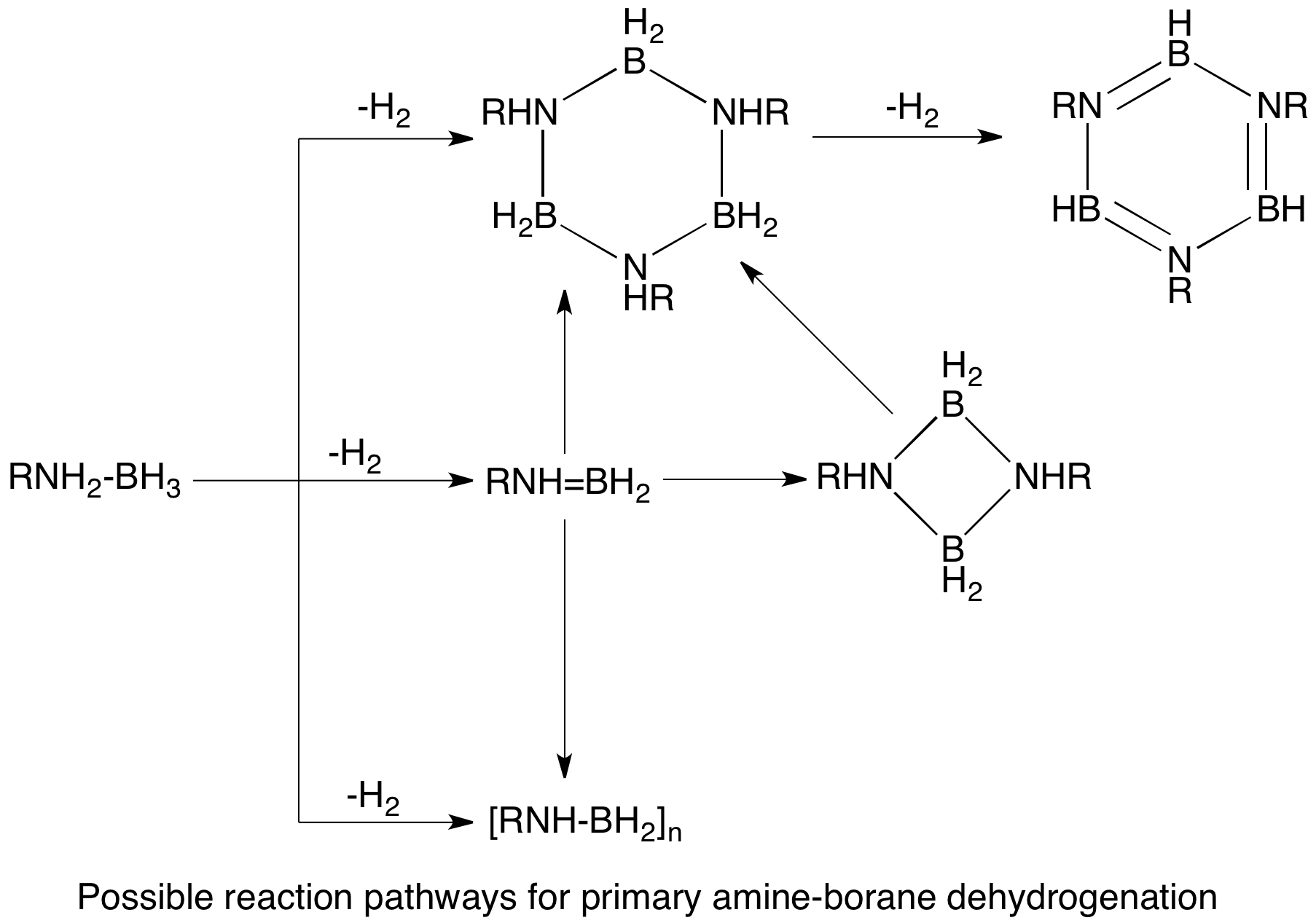
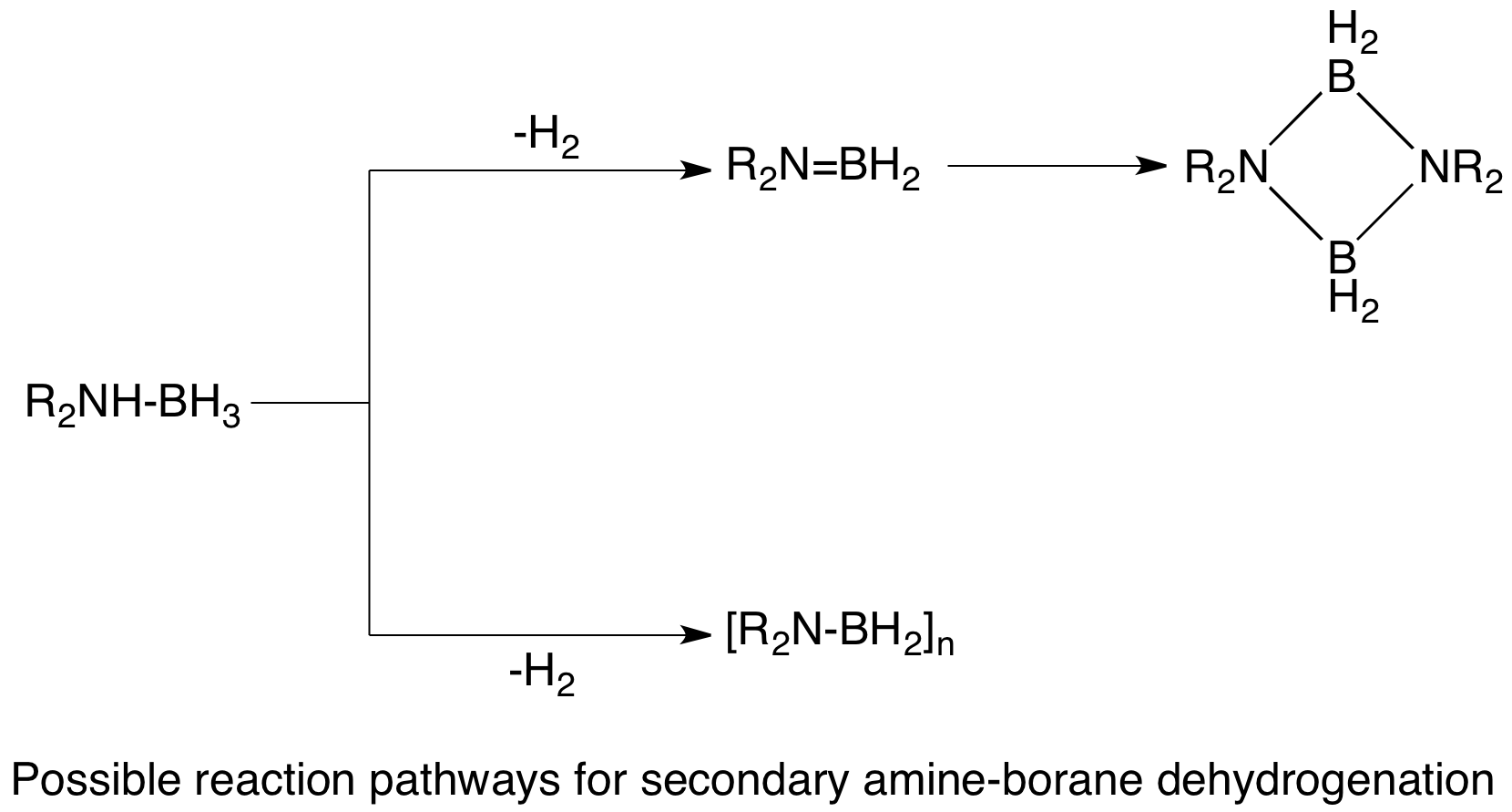
The dehydrogenation of AB would in principle afford (H_{2}BNH_{2})_{n} and (HBNH)_{n}. The monomers (n = 1) are highly unstable with respect to oligomerization.

=== Metal carbonyl catalysts ===
Group 6 metal carbonyls upon photolytic activation catalyze dehydrogenation of AB. Secondary amine-boranes dehydrogenate to form cyclic dimers, or monomeric aminoboranes in the case of more bulky groups on the amine. Similarly, primary amine-boranes dehydrogenate through a two step intramolecular process to give aminoborane polymers, which further dehydrogenate to form borazines. [CpFe(CO)_{2}]_{2} is also an effective precatalyst, requiring photolytic activation. The two step process is proposed to occur first by dehydrogenation of the amine-borane coordinated to the metal, followed by cyclodimerization in an off-metal step.

=== Rhodium and iridium catalysts ===
The first catalysts for the dehydrogenation of ABs were derived from reduction of Rh(I) complexes to form the active colloidal heterogeneous catalyst. Homogeneous catalysts are of the type RhL_{2}, RhClL3, and Rh(H)_{2}L_{2} where L = P(^{i}Pr)_{3}, P(^{i}Bu)_{3}, and PH(cyclohexyl)_{2}.

Related iridium-based catalysts are less active for dehydrogenation of non sterically hindered amine-boranes but more active for sterically hindered substrates. Dehydrocoupling of primary diborazanes NH_{2}R—BH_{2}—NHR—BH_{3} is catalyzed by Brookhart's catalyst via conversion to the metal-bound species MeNH—BH_{2} and subsequent polymerization/oligomerization. This same reaction occurs in the absence of the iridium metal, upon heating of the reaction mixture. Dehydrogenation of ammonia-borane with Brookhart's catalyst results in quantitative formation of the cyclic pentamer [NH_{2}BH_{2}]_{5} rather than the typically seen cyclic dimers from other amine-borane dehydrogenations. When catalyzing ammonia-borane dehydrogenation, the catalyst acts homogeneously at a 0.5 mol% catalyst loading. Rather than the typical high temperatures needed for this dehydrogenation, the reaction proceeds at room temperature, with high conversion.

=== Metallocenes ===
Group 4 metallocenes also catalyze dehydrogenation of ABs. Activity is affected by metal (Ti > Zr > Hf) and inhibited by bulk. Unlike other catalytic processes, the reaction proceeds via a linear aminoborane [NR_{2}BH_{2}]_{2}, which then cyclodimerizes through a dehydrocoupling process on the metal. Most of the zirconocene complexes contain the zirconium in the +4 oxidation state, and the systems are not very active catalysts for amine-borane dehydrogenation. In contrast to these systems, the cationic zirconocene complex [Cp_{2}ZrOC_{6}H_{4}P(^{t}Bu)_{2}]^{+} effectively catalyzes the reaction, with the most notable example being the dehydrogenation of dimethylamineborane in 10min at room temperature.

== Potential applications ==
=== Hydrogen storage ===
Dehydrogenation of amine-boranes is thermodynamically favourable, making the process attractive for hydrogen storage systems. Ammonia borane has attracted particular interest due to its high weight percent of hydrogen (19.6%). Dehydrogenation occurs in three steps, creating polyamino-boranes and borazines as insoluble side products. The dehydrogenation reactions are irreversible, which limits the utility of this process for hydrogen storage.

=== Hydrogen transfer ===
Amine-borane dehydrogenation can be coupled with hydride transfer to unsaturated functional groups, usually olefins in an anti-Markovnikov fashion. Hydroboration of the olefin and release of H_{2} from the amine-borane occur in parallel reactions, reducing the percent of olefin reduced.
