= Triisopropylphosphine =

Chemical compound

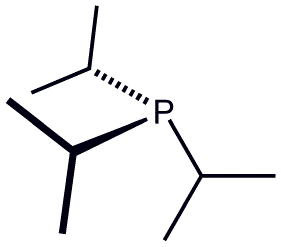

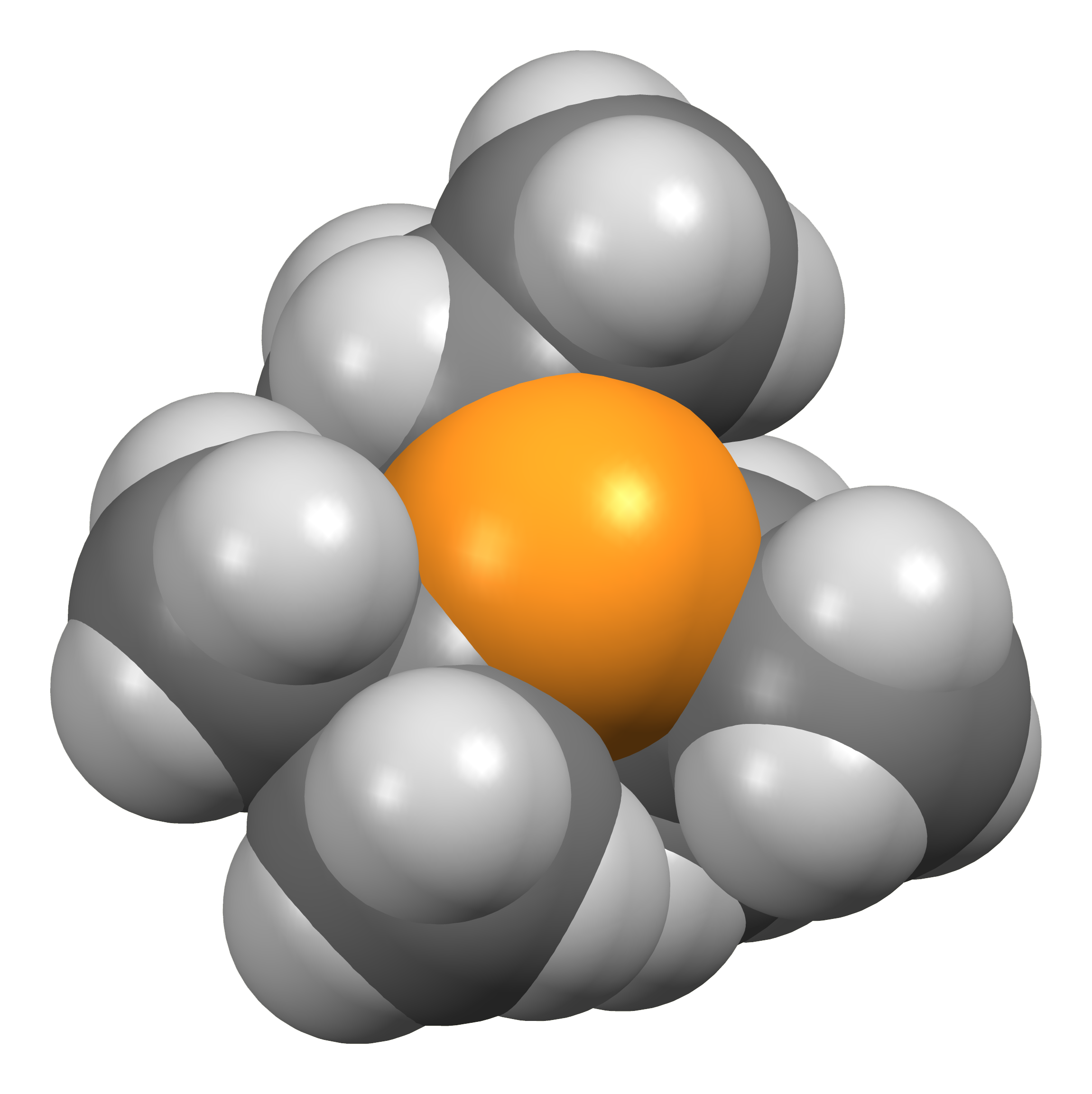

Names
- Preferred IUPAC name Tri(propan-2-yl)phosphane
- Other names Triisopropylphosphine; P^{i}Pr_{3} Pi-Pr_{3}

Identifiers
CAS Number	6476-36-4
3D model (JSmol)	Interactive image
ChemSpider	73055
ECHA InfoCard	100.026.667
PubChem CID	24863218
UNII	MDE86CLL2B
CompTox Dashboard (EPA)	DTXSID80215074
- InChI: InChI=1S/C9H21P/c1-7(2)10(8(3)4)9(5)6/h7-9H,1-6H3 Key: IGNTWNVBGLNYDV-UHFFFAOYSA-N; InChI=1/C9H21P/c1-7(2)10(8(3)4)9(5)6/h7-9H,1-6H3 Key: IGNTWNVBGLNYDV-UHFFFAOYAM
- SMILES: CC(C)P(C(C)C)C(C)C

Properties
Chemical formula	C_{9}H_{21}P
Molar mass	160.24 g mol^{−1}
Appearance	colourless liquid
Density	0.839 g/mL
Boiling point	81 °C (178 °F; 354 K) (22 mm Hg)
Solubility in water	good in alkanes

Hazards
- Occupational safety and health (OHS/OSH)
Main hazards	spontaneously flammable
- Except where otherwise noted, data are given for materials in their standard state (at 25 °C [77 °F], 100 kPa). verify (what is ?) Infobox references

Triisopropylphosphine is the tertiary phosphine with the formula P(CH(CH_{3})_{2})_{3}. Commonly used as a ligand in organometallic chemistry, it is often abbreviated to Pi-Pr_{3} or P^{i}Pr_{3}. This ligand is one of the most basic alkyl phosphines with a large ligand cone angle of 160.

Pi-Pr_{3} is similar to the more frequently used tricyclohexylphosphine. The triisopropyl derivative however, is a liquid at room temperature and more soluble in hydrocarbons.
