= Borane dimethylsulfide =

Names
- IUPAC name (Dimethylsulfonio)trihydridoborate
- Other names BMS, Borane-dimethyl sulfide

Identifiers
CAS Number	13292-87-0
3D model (JSmol)	Interactive image
ChemSpider	28533982
ECHA InfoCard	100.032.998
EC Number	236-313-6
PubChem CID	12423031
UNII	6AVE9SRR08
CompTox Dashboard (EPA)	DTXSID3051672
- InChI: InChI=1S/C2H6S.BH3/c1-3-2;/h1-2H3;1H3 Key: RMHDLBZYPISZOI-UHFFFAOYSA-N
- SMILES: [BH3-][S+](C)C

Properties
Chemical formula	BH_{3}·S(CH_{3})_{2}
Molar mass	75.96 g/mol
Appearance	colorless liquid
Density	0.801 g/mL
- Except where otherwise noted, data are given for materials in their standard state (at 25 °C [77 °F], 100 kPa). Infobox references

Borane dimethylsulfide (BMS) is a chemical compound with the chemical formula BH_{3}·S(CH_{3})_{2}. It is an adduct between borane molecule (BH_{3}) and dimethyl sulfide molecule (S(CH_{3})_{2}). It is a complexed borane reagent that is used for hydroborations and reductions. The advantages of BMS over other borane reagents, such as borane-tetrahydrofuran, are its increased stability and higher solubility. BMS is commercially available at much higher concentrations than its tetrahydrofuran counterpart (10 M) and does not require sodium borohydride as a stabilizer, which could result in undesired side reactions. In contrast, BH_{3}·THF requires sodium borohydride to inhibit reduction of THF to tributyl borate (B(OCH_{2}CH_{2}CH_{2}CH_{3})_{3}). BMS is soluble in most aprotic solvents.

== Preparation and structure ==
Although usually purchased, BMS can be prepared by absorbing diborane into dimethyl sulfide:

B_{2}H_{6} + 2 S(CH_{3})_{2} → 2 BH_{3}·S(CH_{3})_{2}

It can be purified by bulb to bulb vacuum transfer. Although a structure of BMS has not been determined crystallographically, (pentafluorophenyl)-borane dimethylsulfide (C_{6}F_{5}BH_{2}·S(CH_{3})_{2}), has been examined by X-ray crystallography. The boron atom adopts a tetrahedral molecular geometry.

== Reactions ==
=== Hydroborations ===
Due to the experimental ease of its use, BMS has become common in hydroboration reactions. In hydroborations with BMS, the dimethylsulfide dissociates in situ, liberating diborane, which rapidly adds to the unsaturated bonds. The resulting organoborane compounds are useful intermediates in organic synthesis. Boranes add to alkenes in an anti-Markovnikov fashion and allow conversion of alkynes to the corresponding cis-alkenes.

=== Reductions ===
BMS has been employed for the reduction of many functional groups. Reductions of aldehydes, ketones, epoxides, esters, and carboxylic acids give the corresponding alcohols. Lactones are reduced to diols, and nitriles are reduced to amines. Acid chlorides are not reduced by BMS.

Borane dimethylsulfide is one of the most common bulk reducing agents used in the Corey–Itsuno reduction. The dimethylsulfide ligand attenuates the reactivity of the borane. Activation by the nitrogen of the chiral oxazaborolidine catalyst of the stoichiometric reducing agent allows for asymmetric control of the reagent. In general BMS does not lead to significantly greater enantiomeric selectivities than borane-THF, however its increased stability in the presence of moisture and oxygen makes it the reagent of choice for the reduction.

== Safety ==
Borane dimethylsulfide is flammable and reacts readily with water to produce a flammable gas. It also has an unpleasant smell.
