= Thexylborane =

- Dimeric form of thexylborane

Identifiers
CAS Number	monomer: 3688-24-2; dimer: 37099-64-2
3D model (JSmol)	monomer: Interactive image; dimer: Interactive image
ChemSpider	monomer: 4483657
PubChem CID	monomer: 10877414
- InChI: Key: AAYWIXGLVAEPTP-UHFFFAOYSA-N; monomer: InChI=1S/C6H13B/c1-5(2)6(3,4)7/h5H,1-4H3
- SMILES: monomer: [B]C(C)(C)C(C)C; dimer: [H]1[BH]([H][BH]1C(C)(C)C(C)C)C(C)(C)C(C)C

Properties
Chemical formula	C_{12}H_{30}B_{2}
Molar mass	195.99 g·mol^{−1}
Appearance	colorless liquid
- Except where otherwise noted, data are given for materials in their standard state (at 25 °C [77 °F], 100 kPa). Infobox references

Thexylborane is a borane with the formula [Me_{2}CHCMe_{2}BH_{2}]_{2} (Me = methyl). The name derives from "t-hexylborane" (although the group is not the standard tert-hexyl group), and the formula is often abbreviated ThxBH_{2}. A colorless liquid, it is a monoalkylborane. It is produced by the hydroboration of tetramethylethylene:

B_{2}H_{6} + 2 Me_{2}C=CMe_{2} → [Me_{2}CHCMe_{2}BH_{2}]_{2}

== Reactions ==
Thexylborane is generated in situ. In solution, it isomerizes over the course several days to the 2,3-dimethyl-1-butyl derivative, shown as the monomer here:

Me_{2}CHCMe_{2}BH_{2} → Me_{2}CHCH(Me)CH_{2}BH_{2}

Thexylborane allows the synthesis of ketones by coupling a pair of alkenes with carbon monoxide, which serves as a carbonyl linchpin:

Me_{2}CHCMe_{2}BH_{2} + 2 RCH=CH_{2} → Me_{2}CHCH(Me)CH_{2}B(CH_{2}CH_{2}R)_{2}
Me_{2}CHCH(Me)CH_{2}B(CH_{2}CH_{2}R)_{2} + CO + H_{2}O → O=C(CH_{2}CH_{2}R)_{2} + ...

An important feature of this reagent is that the thexyl group almost never undergoes anionotropic 1,2-migration from boron to a neighboring atom.
