= Borane =

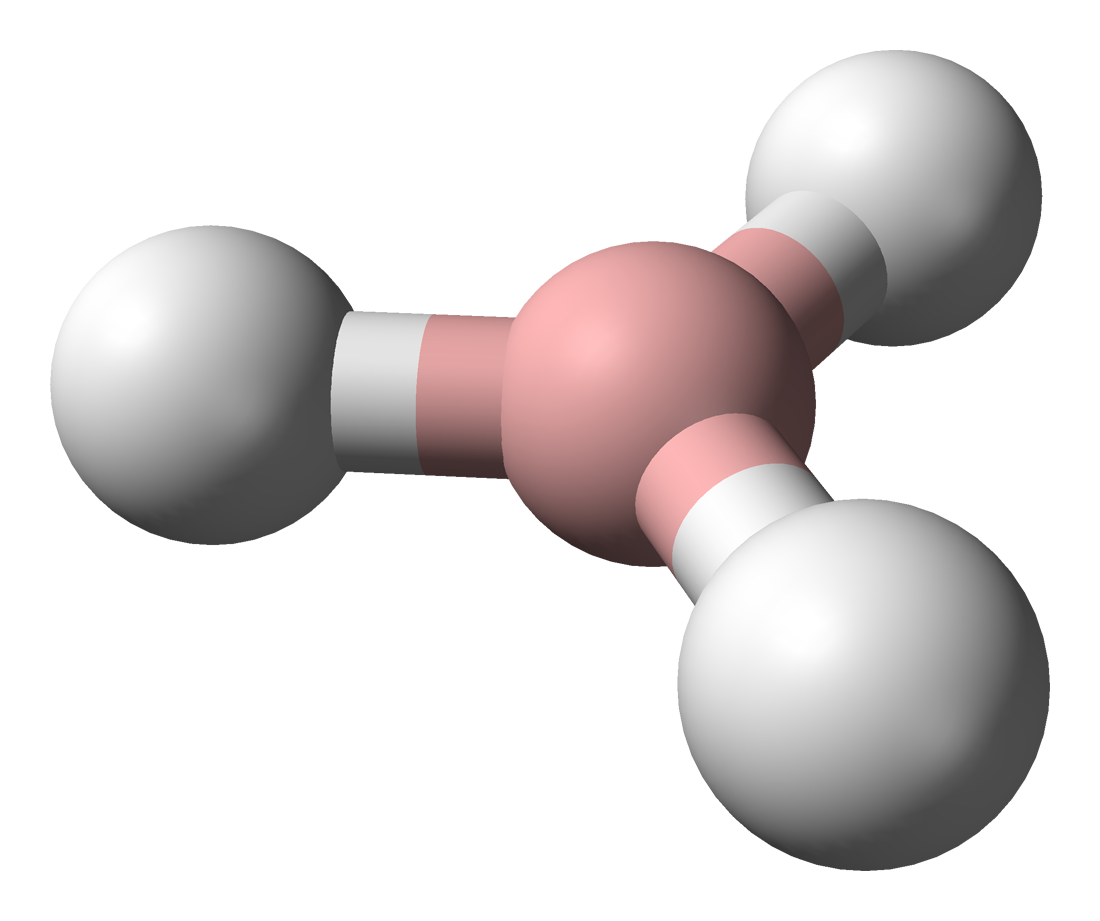

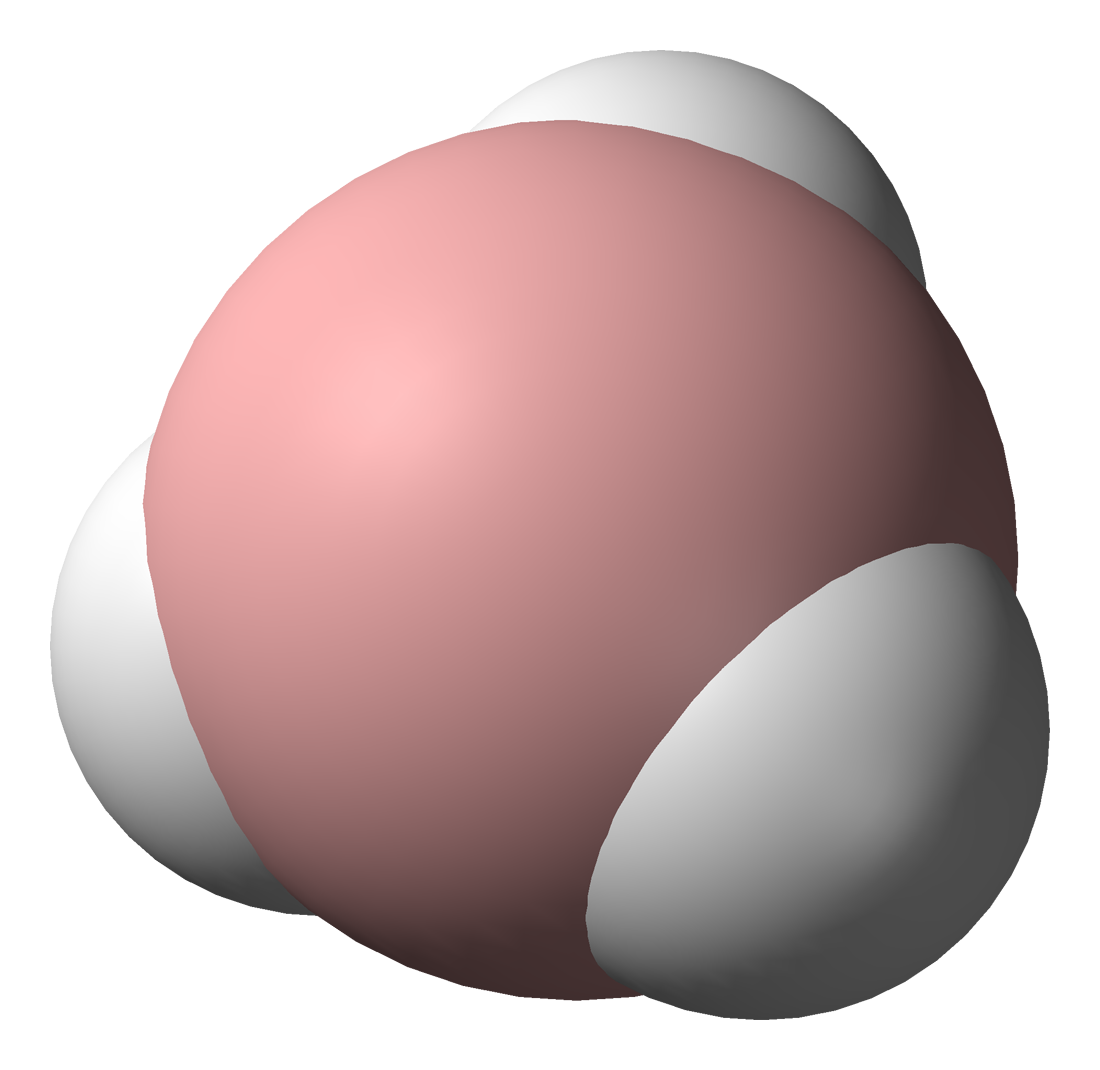

Names
- IUPAC names Borane
- Systematic IUPAC name Borane (substitutive); Trihydridoboron (additive)
- Other names: borine; boron trihydride; hydrogen boride

Identifiers
CAS Number	13283-31-3
3D model (JSmol)	Interactive image
ChEBI	CHEBI:30149
ChemSpider	6091
Gmelin Reference	44
PubChem CID	6331
- InChI: InChI=1S/BH3/h1H3 Key: UORVGPXVDQYIDP-UHFFFAOYSA-N
- SMILES: B

Properties
Chemical formula	BH_{3}
Molar mass	13.83 g·mol^{−1}
Appearance	colourless gas
Conjugate acid	Boronium

Thermochemistry
Std molar entropy (S^{⦵}_{298})	187.88 J mol^{−1} K^{−1}
Std enthalpy of formation (Δ_{f}H^{⦵}_{298})	106.69 kJ mol^{−1}

Structure
Point group	D_{3h}
Molecular shape	trigonal planar
Dipole moment	0 D

Related compounds
Other cations	Alumane; Gallane; Indigane; Thallane
Related compounds	Diborane
- Except where otherwise noted, data are given for materials in their standard state (at 25 °C [77 °F], 100 kPa). Infobox references

Borane is an inorganic compound with the chemical formula BH_{3}. Because it tends to dimerize or form adducts, borane is very rarely observed. It normally dimerizes to diborane in the absence of other chemicals. It can be observed directly as a continuously produced, transitory, product in a flow system or from the reaction of laser ablated atomic boron with hydrogen. Borane is the simplest group 13 hydride.

== Structure and properties ==
BH_{3} is a trigonal planar molecule with D_{3h} symmetry. The experimentally determined B–H bond length is 119 pm.

In the absence of other bases, it dimerizes to form diborane. Thus, it is an intermediate in the preparation of diborane according to the reaction:

BX_{3} +BH_{4}^{−} → HBX_{3}^{−} + (BH_{3}) (X=F, Cl, Br, I)
2 BH_{3} → B_{2}H_{6}

The standard enthalpy of dimerization of BH_{3} is estimated to be −170 kJ mol^{−1}. The boron atom in BH_{3} has 6 valence electrons. Consequently, it is a strong Lewis acid and reacts with any Lewis base ('L' in equation below) to form an adduct:

BH_{3} + L → L—BH_{3}

in which the base donates its lone pair, forming a dative covalent bond. Such compounds are thermodynamically stable, but may be easily oxidised in air. Solutions containing borane dimethylsulfide and borane–tetrahydrofuran are commercially available; in tetrahydrofuran a stabilising agent is added to prevent the THF from oxidising the borane. A stability sequence for several common adducts of borane, estimated from spectroscopic and thermochemical data, is as follows:

PF_{3} < CO< Et_{2}O< Me_{2}O< C_{4}H_{8}O < C_{4}H_{8}S < Et_{2}S< Me_{2}S< Py < Me_{3}N< H^{−}

BH_{3} has some soft acid characteristics as sulfur donors form more stable complexes than do oxygen donors. In water, it readily hydrolyzes into boric acid:

BH_{3} + 3H_{2}O → B(OH)_{3} + 3 H_{2}

== Reactions ==
Molecular species BH_{3} is a very strong Lewis acid. It can be isolated in the form of various adducts, such as borane carbonyl, BH_{3}(CO).

Molecular BH_{3} is believed to be a reaction intermediate in the pyrolysis of diborane to produce higher boranes:

B_{2}H_{6} ⇌ 2 BH_{3}
BH_{3} +B_{2}H_{6} → B_{3}H_{7} +H_{2} (rate determining step)
BH_{3} + B_{3}H_{7} ⇌ B_{4}H_{10}
B_{2}H_{6} + B_{3}H_{7} → BH_{3} + B_{4}H_{10}

⇌ B_{5}H_{11} + H_{2}

Further steps give rise to successively higher boranes, with B_{10}H_{14} as the most stable end product contaminated with polymeric materials, and a little B_{20}H_{26}.

Borane ammoniate, which is produced by a displacement reaction of other borane adducts, eliminates elemental hydrogen on heating to give borazine (HBNH)_{3}.

Borane adducts are widely used in organic synthesis for hydroboration, where BH_{3} adds across the C=C bond in alkenes to give trialkylboranes:

(THF)BH_{3} + 3 CH_{2}=CHR → B(CH_{2}CH_{2}R)_{3} + THF

This reaction is regioselective. Other borane derivatives can be used to give even higher regioselectivity. The product trialkylboranes can be converted to useful organic derivatives. With bulky alkenes one can prepare species such as [HBR_{2}]_{2}, which are also useful reagents in more specialised applications. Borane dimethylsulfide which is more stable than borane–tetrahydrofuran may also be used.

Hydroboration can be coupled with oxidation to give the hydroboration-oxidation reaction. In this reaction, the boryl group in the generated organoborane is substituted with a hydroxyl group.

=== As a Lewis acid ===
Phosphine-boranes, with the formula R_{3−n}H_{n}PBH_{3}, are adducts of organophosphines and borane. Borane adducts with amines are more widely used. Borane makes a strong adduct with triethylamine; using this adduct requires harsher conditions in hydroboration. This can be advantageous for cases such as hydroborating trienes to avoid polymerization. More sterically hindered tertiary and silyl amines can deliver borane to alkenes at room temperature.

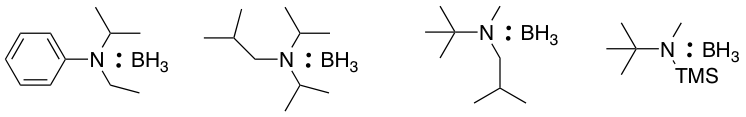

Borane(5) is the dihydrogen complex of borane. Its molecular formula is BH_{5} or possibly BH_{3}(η^{2}-H_{2}). It is only stable at very low temperatures and its existence is confirmed in very low temperature. Borane(5) and methanium (CH^{+}_{5}) are isoelectronic. Its conjugate base is the borohydride anion.

== See also ==
- Butterfly cluster compound
