= 9-Borabicyclo(3.3.1)nonane =

9-Borabicyclo[3.3.1]nonane

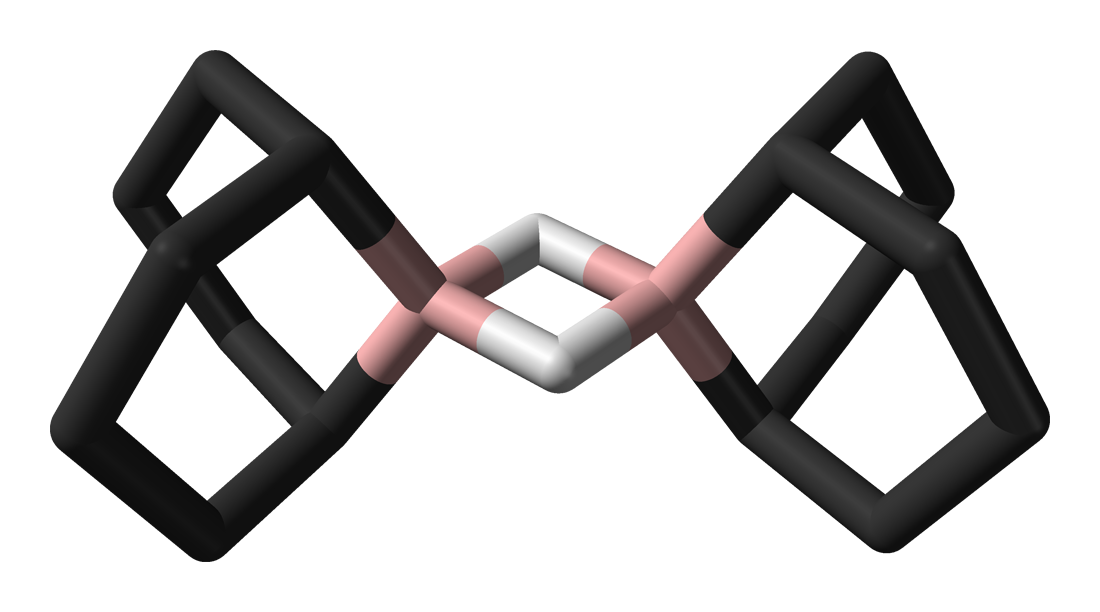

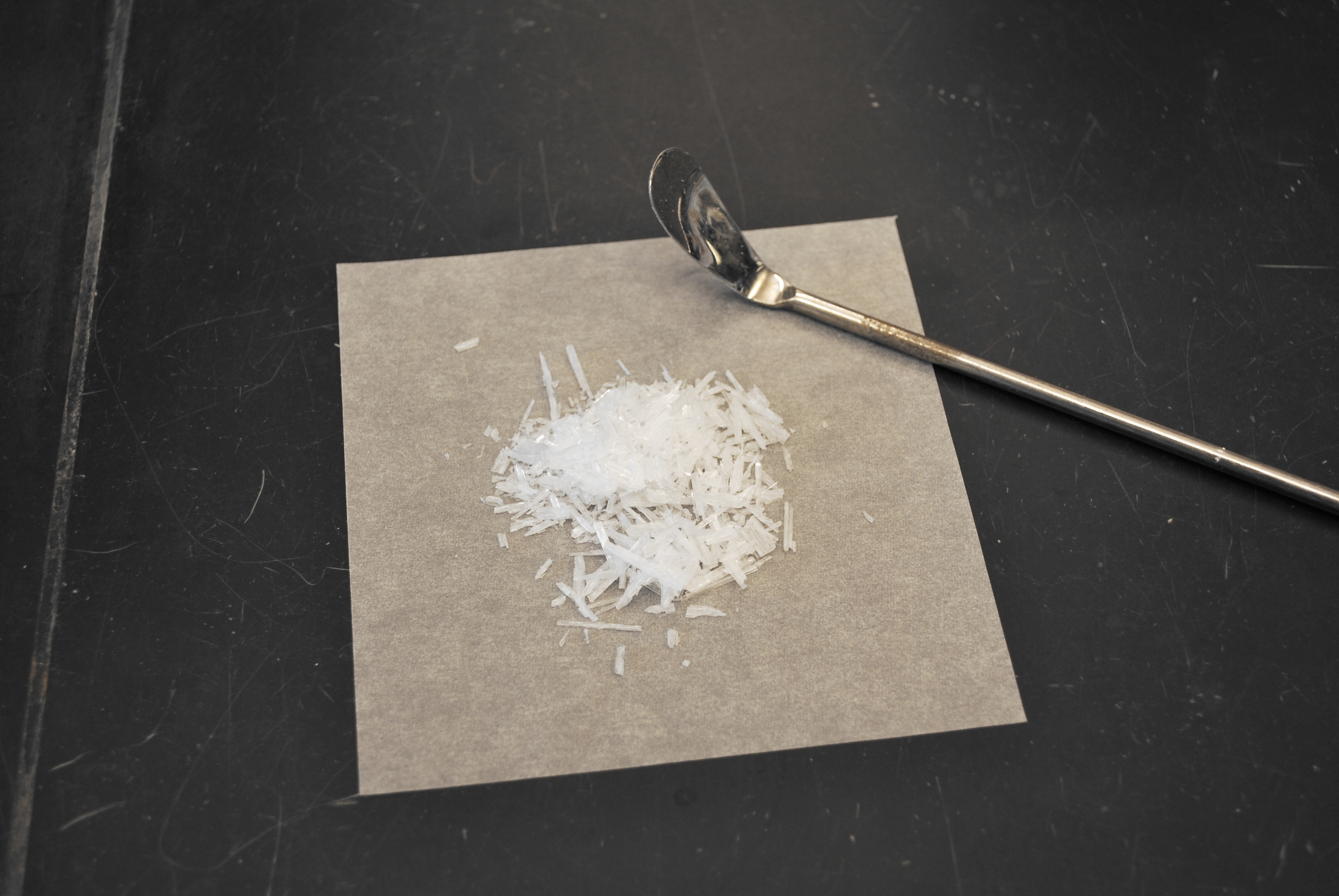

Names
- IUPAC name 9-Borabicyclo[3.3.1]nonane
- Other names Borabicyclononane; Banana borane

Identifiers
CAS Number	280-64-8
3D model (JSmol)	Interactive image
Abbreviations	9-BBN
ChemSpider	71299
ECHA InfoCard	100.005.456
EC Number	206-000-9
PubChem CID	6327450
UNII	4K4J8L1OG9
CompTox Dashboard (EPA)	DTXSID3074781
- InChI: InChI=1S/C8H15B/c1-3-7-5-2-6-8(4-1)9-7/h7-9H,1-6H2 Key: FEJUGLKDZJDVFY-UHFFFAOYSA-N; InChI=1/C8H15B/c1-3-7-5-2-6-8(4-1)9-7/h7-9H,1-6H2 Key: FEJUGLKDZJDVFY-UHFFFAOYAE
- SMILES: B1([H]3)(C2CCCC1CCC2)[H]B34C2CCCC4CCC2

Properties
Chemical formula	C_{16}H_{30}B_{2}
Molar mass	244.04 g·mol^{−1}
Density	0.894 g/cm^{3}
Melting point	153 to 155 °C (307 to 311 °F; 426 to 428 K)
Solubility in water	Reacts

Hazards
- GHS labelling
Pictograms	(GHS02: Flammable) (GHS05: Corrosive)
Signal word	Warning
Hazard statements	H250, H260, H314
Precautionary statements	P210, P222, P223, P231+P232, P260, P264, P280, P301+P330+P331, P302+P334, P303+P361+P353, P304+P340, P305+P351+P338, P310, P321, P335+P334, P363, P370+P378, P402+P404, P405, P422, P501
- Except where otherwise noted, data are given for materials in their standard state (at 25 °C [77 °F], 100 kPa). verify (what is ?) Infobox references

9-Borabicyclo[3.3.1]nonane or 9-BBN is an organoborane compound. This colourless solid is used in organic chemistry as a hydroboration reagent. The compound exists as a hydride-bridged dimer, which easily cleaves in the presence of reducible substrates. 9-BBN is also known by its nickname 'banana borane'. This is because rather than drawing out the full structure, chemists often simply draw a banana shape with the bridging boron.

== Preparation ==
9-BBN is prepared by the reaction of 1,5-cyclooctadiene and borane usually in ethereal solvents, for example:

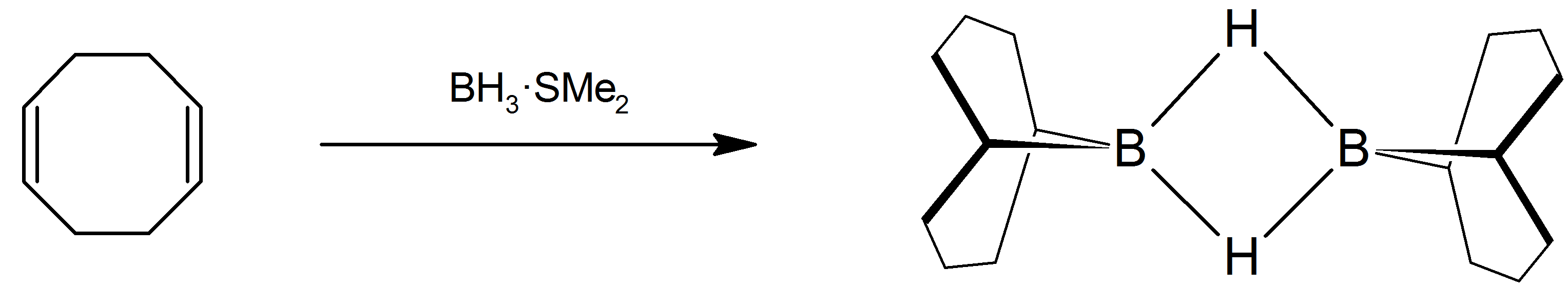

The compound is commercially available as a solution in tetrahydrofuran and as a solid. 9-BBN is especially useful in Suzuki reactions.

Its highly regioselective addition on alkenes allows the preparation of terminal alcohols by subsequent oxidative cleavage with H_{2}O_{2} in aqueous KOH. The steric demand of 9-BBN greatly suppresses the formation of the 2-substituted isomer compared to the use of borane.

== See also ==
- Organoboron chemistry
- Boron
