= Diborane =

- Stereo skeletal formula of diborane with all explicit hydrogens added and assorted measurements

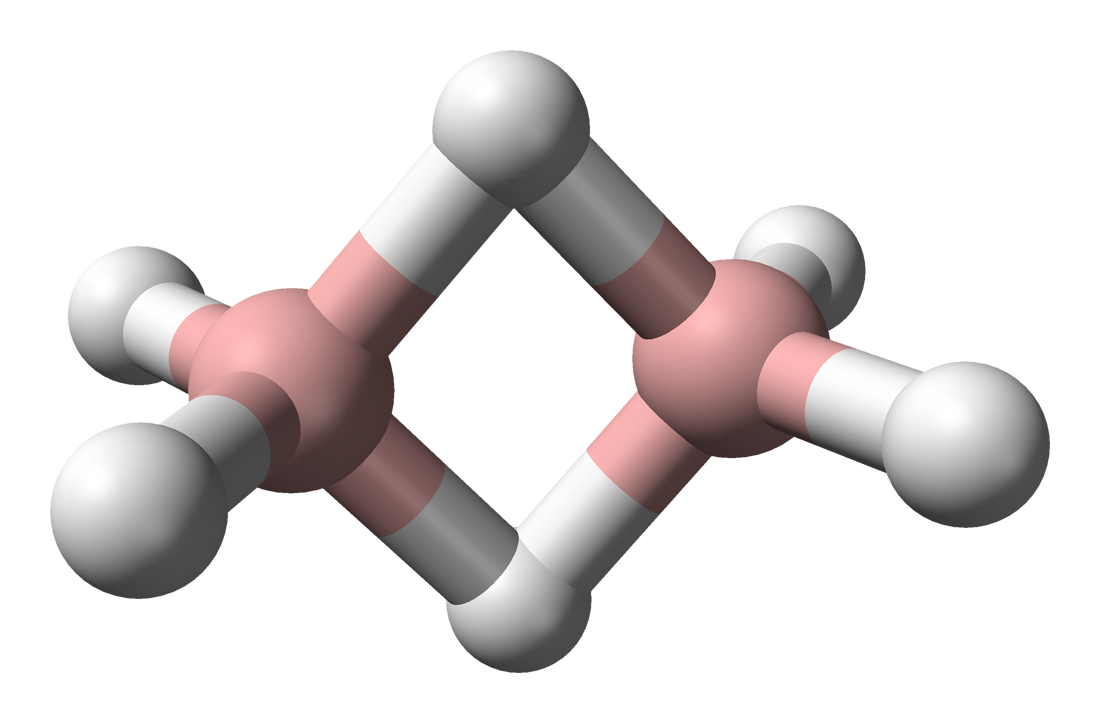
- Ball and stick model of diborane

Names
- IUPAC name Diborane(6)

Identifiers
CAS Number	19287-45-7
3D model (JSmol)	Interactive image
ChEBI	CHEBI:33590
ChemSpider	17215804
ECHA InfoCard	100.039.021
EC Number	242-940-6
PubChem CID	12544638
RTECS number	HQ9275000
UNII	BS9K982N24
UN number	1911
CompTox Dashboard (EPA)	DTXSID9024938
- InChI: InChI=1S/B2H6/c1-3-2-4-1/h1-2H2 Key: KLDBIFITUCWVCC-UHFFFAOYSA-N; InChI=1/B2H6/c1-3-2-4-1/h1-2H2 Key: KLDBIFITUCWVCC-UHFFFAOYAF
- SMILES: [BH2]1[H][BH2][H]1

Properties
Chemical formula	B_{2}H_{6}
Molar mass	27.67 g·mol^{−1}
Appearance	Colorless gas
Odor	repulsive and sweet
Density	1.131 g/L
Melting point	−164.85 °C (−264.73 °F; 108.30 K)
Boiling point	−92.49 °C (−134.48 °F; 180.66 K)
Solubility in water	Reacts
Solubility in other solvents	Diglyme and Diethyl Ether,
Vapor pressure	39.5 atm (16.6 °C)

Structure
Coordination geometry	Tetrahedral (for boron)
Molecular shape	see text
Dipole moment	0 D

Thermochemistry
Heat capacity (C)	56.7 J/(mol·K)
Std molar entropy (S^{⦵}_{298})	232.1 J/(mol·K)
Std enthalpy of formation (Δ_{f}H^{⦵}_{298})	36.4 kJ/mol

Hazards
- Occupational safety and health (OHS/OSH)
Main hazards	toxic, highly flammable, reacts with water
- GHS labelling
Pictograms	(GHS02: Flammable) (GHS06: Toxic) (GHS08: Health hazard)
Signal word	Danger
Hazard statements	H220, H314, H330, H370, H372
Precautionary statements	P210, P260, P264, P270, P271, P280, P284, P301+P330+P331, P303+P361+P353, P304+P340, P305+P351+P338, P307+P311, P310, P314, P320, P321, P363, P377, P381, P403, P403+P233, P405, P410+P403, P501
NFPA 704 (fire diamond)	4 4 3 W
Flash point	−90 °C (−130 °F; 183 K)
Autoignition temperature	38 °C (100 °F; 311 K)
Explosive limits	0.8–88%
- Lethal dose or concentration (LD, LC)
LC_{50} (median concentration)	40 ppm (rat, 4 h); 29 ppm (mouse, 4 h); 40–80 ppm (rat, 4 h); 159–181 ppm (rat, 15 min)
LC_{Lo} (lowest published)	125 ppm (dog, 2 h); 50 ppm (hamster, 8 h)
- NIOSH (US health exposure limits)
PEL (Permissible)	TWA 0.1 ppm (0.1 mg/m^{3})
REL (Recommended)	TWA 0.1 ppm (0.1 mg/m^{3})
IDLH (Immediate danger)	15 ppm
Safety data sheet (SDS)	ICSC 0432

Related compounds
Related boron compounds	Decaborane; BF_{3}
- Except where otherwise noted, data are given for materials in their standard state (at 25 °C [77 °F], 100 kPa). verify (what is ?) Infobox references

Diborane(6), commonly known as diborane, is the inorganic compound with the formula B_{2}H_{6}. It is a highly toxic, colorless, and pyrophoric gas with a repulsively sweet odor. Given its simple formula, diborane is a fundamental boron compound. It has attracted wide attention for its unique electronic structure. Several of its derivatives are useful reagents.

== Structure and bonding ==
Bonding diagram of diborane (B_{2}H_{6}) showing with curved lines a pair of three-center two-electron bonds, each of which consists of a pair of electrons bonding three atoms; two boron atoms and a hydrogen atom in the middle

The structure of diborane has D_{2h} symmetry. Four hydrides are terminal, while two bridge between the boron centers. The lengths of the B–H_{bridge} bonds and the B–H_{terminal} bonds are 1.33 and 1.19 Å respectively. This difference in bond lengths reflects the difference in their strengths, the B–H_{bridge} bonds being relatively weaker. The weakness of the B–H_{bridge} compared to B–H_{terminal} bonds is indicated by their vibrational signatures in the infrared spectrum, being ≈2100 and 2500 cm^{−1} respectively.

The model determined by molecular orbital theory describes the bonds between boron and the terminal hydrogen atoms as conventional 2-center 2-electron covalent bonds. The bonding between the boron atoms and the bridging hydrogen atoms is, however, different from that in molecules such as hydrocarbons. Each boron uses two electrons in bonding to the terminal hydrogen atoms and has one valence electron remaining for additional bonding. The bridging hydrogen atoms provide one electron each. The B_{2}H_{2} ring is held together by four electrons forming two 3-center 2-electron bonds. This type of bond is sometimes called a "banana bond".

B_{2}H_{6} is isoelectronic with C_{2}H^{2+}_{6}, which would arise from the diprotonation of the planar molecule ethylene. Diborane is one of many compounds with such unusual bonding.

Of the other elements in the boron group, gallium is known to form a similar compound digallane, Ga_{2}H_{6}. Aluminium forms a polymeric hydride, ((AlH_{3})_{n}; although unstable, Al_{2}H_{6} has been isolated in solid hydrogen and is isostructural with diborane.

== Production and synthesis ==
Extensive studies of diborane have led to the development of multiple synthesis routes. Most preparations entail reactions of hydride donors with boron halides or alkoxides. The industrial synthesis of diborane involves the reduction of BF_{3} by sodium hydride (NaH), lithium hydride (LiH) or lithium aluminium hydride (LiAlH_{4}):

8 BF_{3} + 6 LiH → B_{2}H_{6} + 6 LiBF_{4}

Lithium hydride used for this purpose must be very finely powdered to avoid the formation of a passivating lithium tetrafluoroborate layer on the reactant. Alternatively, a small amount of diborane product can be added to form lithium borohydride, which will react with the BF_{3} to produce more diborane, making the reaction autocatalytic.

Two laboratory methods start from boron trichloride with lithium aluminium hydride or from boron trifluoride ether solution with sodium borohydride. Both methods result in as much as 30% yield:

4 BCl_{3} + 3 LiAlH_{4} → 2 B_{2}H_{6} + 3 LiAlCl_{4}
4 BF_{3} + 3 NaBH_{4} → 2 B_{2}H_{6} + 3 NaBF_{4}

When heated with NaBH_{4}, tin(II) chloride is reduced to elemental tin, forming diborane in the process:

SnCl_{2} + 2NaBH_{4} → 2NaCl + Sn + B_{2}H_{6} + H_{2}

Older methods entail the direct reaction of borohydride salts with a non-oxidizing acid, such as phosphoric acid or dilute sulfuric acid:

2 BH^{−}_{4} + 2 H^{+} → 2 H_{2} + B_{2}H_{6}

Similarly, oxidation of borohydride salts has been demonstrated and remains convenient for small-scale preparations. For example, using iodine as an oxidizer:

2 NaBH_{4} + I_{2} → 2 NaI + B_{2}H_{6} + H_{2}

Another small-scale synthesis uses potassium borohydride and phosphoric acid as starting materials.

== Reactions ==
Borane dimethylsulfide generally functions equivalently to diborane and is easier to use.

Diborane is a highly reactive and versatile reagent.

=== Air, water, oxygen ===
As a pyrophoric substance, diborane reacts exothermically with oxygen to form boron trioxide and water:

2 B_{2}H_{6} + 6 O_{2} → 2 B_{2}O_{3} + 6 H_{2}O ; ΔH_{r} = −2035 kJ/mol = −73.47 kJ/g

Diborane reacts violently with water to form hydrogen and boric acid:

B_{2}H_{6} + 6 H_{2}O → 2 B(OH)_{3} + 6 H_{2} ; ΔH_{r} = −466 kJ/mol = −16.82 kJ/g)

Diborane also reacts with alcohols similarly. For example, the reaction with methanol gives hydrogen and trimethylborate:

B_{2}H_{6} + 6 MeOH → 2 B(OMe)_{3} + 6 H_{2}

=== Lewis acidity ===
One dominating reaction pattern involves formation of adducts with Lewis bases. Often such initial adducts proceed rapidly to give other products. For example, borane-tetrahydrofuran, which often behaves equivalently to diborane, degrades to borate esters. Its adduct with dimethyl sulfide is an important reagent in organic synthesis. With ammonia diborane forms the diammoniate of diborane, DADB with small quantities of ammonia borane as byproduct. The ratio depends on the conditions.

=== Hydroboration ===
In the hydroboration reaction, diborane also reacts readily with alkenes to form trialkylboranes. This reaction pattern is rather general and the resulting alkyl borates can be readily derivatized, e.g. to alcohols. Although early work on hydroboration relied on diborane, it has been replaced by borane dimethylsulfide, which is more safely handled.

=== Other ===
Pyrolysis of diborane gives hydrogen and diverse boron hydride clusters. For example, pentaborane was first prepared by pyrolysis of diborane at about 200 °C. Although this pyrolysis route is rarely employed, it ushered in a large research theme of borane cluster chemistry.

Treating diborane with sodium amalgam gives NaBH_{4} and Na[B_{3}H_{8}] When diborane is treated with lithium hydride in diethyl ether, lithium borohydride is formed:

B_{2}H_{6} + 2 LiH → 2 LiBH_{4}

Diborane reacts with anhydrous hydrogen chloride or hydrogen bromide gas to give a boron halohydride:

B_{2}H_{6} + HCl → B_{2}H_{5}Cl + H_{2}

Treating diborane with carbon monoxide at 470 K and 20 bar gives H_{3}BCO.

== Reagent in organic synthesis ==
Diborane and its variants are central organic synthesis reagents for hydroboration. Alkenes add across the B–H bonds to give trialkylboranes, which can be further elaborated. Diborane is used as a reducing agent roughly complementary to the reactivity of lithium aluminium hydride. The compound readily reduces carboxylic acids to the corresponding alcohols, whereas ketones react only sluggishly.

== History ==
Diborane was first synthesised in the 19th century by hydrolysis of metal borides, but it was never analysed. From 1912 to 1936, Alfred Stock, the major pioneer in the chemistry of boron hydrides, undertook his research that led to the methods for the synthesis and handling of the highly reactive, volatile, and often toxic boron hydrides. He proposed the first ethane-like structure of diborane. Electron diffraction measurements by S. H. Bauer initially appeared to support his proposed structure.

Because of a personal communication with L. Pauling (who supported the ethane-like structure), H. I. Schlessinger and A. B. Burg did not specifically discuss 3-center 2-electron bonding in their then classic review in the early 1940s. The review does, however, discuss the bridged D_{2h} structure in some depth: "It is to be recognized that this formulation easily accounts for many of the chemical properties of diborane..."

In 1943, H. Christopher Longuet-Higgins, while still an undergraduate at Oxford, was the first to explain the structure and bonding of the boron hydrides. The article reporting the work, written with his tutor R. P. Bell, also reviews the history of the subject beginning with the work of Dilthey. Shortly afterwards, the theoretical work of Longuet-Higgins was confirmed in an infrared study of diborane by Price. The structure was re-confirmed by electron-diffraction measurement in 1951 by K. Hedberg and V. Schomaker, with the confirmation of the structure shown in the schemes on this page.

William Nunn Lipscomb Jr. further confirmed the molecular structure of boranes using X-ray crystallography in the 1950s and developed theories to explain their bonding. Later, he applied the same methods to related problems, including the structure of carboranes, on which he directed the research of future 1981 Nobel Prize winner Roald Hoffmann. The 1976 Nobel Prize in Chemistry was awarded to Lipscomb "for his studies on the structure of boranes illuminating problems of chemical bonding".

Traditionally, diborane has often been described as electron-deficient, because the 12 valence electrons can only form 6 conventional 2-centre 2-electron bonds, which are insufficient to join all 8 atoms. However, the more correct description using 3-centre bonds shows that diborane is really electron-precise, since there are just enough valence electrons to fill the 6 bonding molecular orbitals. Nevertheless, some leading textbooks still use the term "electron-deficient".

== Other uses ==
Because of the exothermicity of its reaction with oxygen, diborane has been tested as a rocket propellant. Complete combustion is strongly exothermic. However, combustion is not complete in the rocket engine, producing boron monoxide (BO) and boron trioxide (B_{2}O_{3}). The latter has a tendency to deposit on the chamber wall and nozzle, altering their geometries and reducing efficiency. This conversion mirrors the incomplete combustion of hydrocarbons, to produce carbon monoxide (CO). Diborane also proved difficult to handle.

Diborane has been investigated as a precursor to metal boride films and for the p-doping of silicon semiconductors.

== Safety ==
Diborane is a pyrophoric gas. Commercially available adducts are typically used instead, at least for applications in organic chemistry. These adducts include borane-tetrahydrofuran (borane-THF) and borane-dimethylsulfide. The toxic effects of diborane are mitigated because the compound is so unstable in air. The toxicity toward laboratory rats has been investigated.

== Cited sources ==
- Haynes, William M., ed. (2011). CRC Handbook of Chemistry and Physics (92nd ed.). CRC Press. ISBN 978-1439855119.
- Yerazunis, S., et al. “Solubility of Diborane in the Dimethyl Ether and Diethylene Glycol, in Mixtures of Sodium Borohydride and Dimethyl Ether of Diethylene Glycol, and in Ditertiary Butyl Sulfide.” Journal of Chemical & Engineering Data, vol. 7, no. 3, July 1962, pp. 337–39, doi:10.1021/je60014a004.
