= Trivinylboroxin =

Names
- IUPAC name 2,4,6-tris(ethenyl)-1,3,5,2,4,6-trioxatriborinane
- Other names Trivinylboroxin, triethenylboroxin, 2,4,6-trivinyl-1,3,5,2,4,6-trioxatriborinane, 2,4,6-trivinylcyclotriboroxane

Identifiers
CAS Number	92988-08-4
3D model (JSmol)	Interactive image
ChemSpider	2016551
ECHA InfoCard	100.201.208
EC Number	675-971-2
PubChem CID	2734807
CompTox Dashboard (EPA)	DTXSID30918801
- InChI: InChI=1S/C6H9B3O3/c1-4-7-10-8(5-2)12-9(6-3)11-7/h4-6H,1-3H2 Key: WBRSYBLNSTYNPP-UHFFFAOYSA-N
- SMILES: B1(OB(OB(O1)C=C)C=C)C=C

Properties
Chemical formula	C_{6}H_{9}B_{3}O_{3}
Molar mass	161.57 g·mol^{−1}
Appearance	colourless liquid
Density	0.89 g/ml
Boiling point	114 °C (237 °F; 387 K)

Hazards
- Occupational safety and health (OHS/OSH)
Main hazards	flammable
- GHS labelling
Pictograms	(GHS07: Exclamation mark)
Signal word	Warning
Hazard statements	H302, H315, H319, H335
Precautionary statements	P261, P264, P264+P265, P270, P271, P280, P301+P317, P302+P352, P304+P340, P305+P351+P338, P319, P321, P330, P332+P317, P337+P317, P362+P364, P403+P233, P405, P501
- Except where otherwise noted, data are given for materials in their standard state (at 25 °C [77 °F], 100 kPa). Infobox references

Trivinylboroxin is the organoboron compound, consists of a six-membered ring with boron and oxygen atoms, with vinyl groups attached to each boron atom. It is the synthetic equivalent of vinyl boronic acid in the Suzuki reaction.

Trivinylboroxin can be prepared from trimethyl borate and vinylmagnesium bromide, but its isolation is difficult due to its rapid polymerization.

== Applications ==
Trivinylboroxine is usually used in organic chemistry to produce styrene derivatives by the Suzuki reaction. However, trivinylboroxine rapidly decomposes with polymerization during storage, which makes its use in laboratory practice difficult.

Reactions in the presence of copper(II) acetate with trivinylboroxine lead to the formation of vinyl esters.

In organic synthesis, a complex of trivinylboroxine with pyridine is often used (O'shea reagent). This complex is a solid that can be stored undisturbed at low temperatures (-20 °C) without evidence of decomposition. The O'shea reagent is also used for the synthesis of vinyl-substituted heterocyclic compounds.

The preparation of ortho-substituted styrenes using trivinylboroxine pyridine complex is of practical importance, for example, in this way benzo-fused rings can be obtained. Also, ortho-substituted styrene derivatives are important substances for the production of polymer materials. Traditional methods for generating styrenes typically involve dehydration under acidic conditions or elimination under basic conditions to form the double bond.
