= Protodeboronation =

Chemical reaction

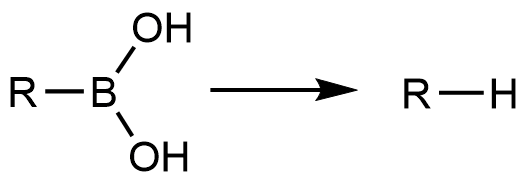
Simple protodeboronation scheme

Protodeboronation, or protodeborylation is a chemical reaction involving the protonolysis of a boronic acid (or other organoborane compound) in which a carbon-boron bond is broken and replaced with a carbon-hydrogen bond. Protodeboronation is a well-known undesired side reaction, and frequently associated with metal-catalysed coupling reactions that utilise boronic acids (see Suzuki reaction). For a given boronic acid, the propensity to undergo protodeboronation is highly variable and dependent on various factors, such as the reaction conditions employed and the organic substituent of the boronic acid.

The deliberate protodeboronation of boronic acids (and derivatives) have been applied to some synthetic procedures, such as the installation of a stereospecific proton at chiral centers, and also in purification procedures, such as the removal of unwanted regioisomeric boronic acid by-products.

Recent mechanistic studies have revealed a variety of protodeboronation pathways in aqueous media, and have demonstrated the reaction pH (and subsequently the boronic acid speciation) to be an important factor in understanding the modes of protodeboronation.

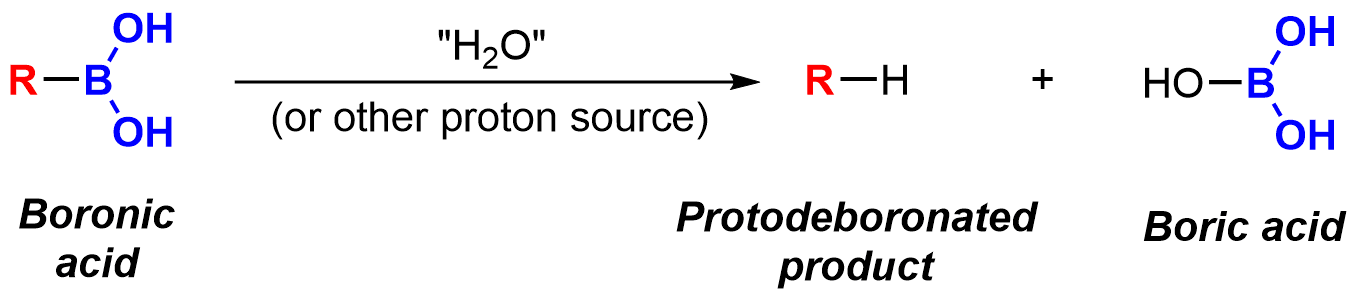
A general reaction scheme for the protodeboronation of boronic acids

== History ==
One of the earliest reports of protodeboronation was made by Ainley and Challenger, who were the first researchers to explore the reactivity of boronic acids with common chemical reagents. They reported the reaction of phenylboronic acid in water (140-150 °C) to afford the protodeboronated product, benzene, after 40 hours.

Initial synthetic applications of protodeboronation were found alongside the discovery of the hydroboration reaction, in which sequential hydroboration-protodeboronation reactions were used to convert alkynes or alkenes into the corresponding saturated compounds. Beyond this synthetic application, protodeboronation was rarely noted or valued in other chemical processes throughout the early 20th century. However, in more recent years, protodeboronation has emerged as a problematic side reaction with many chemical processes that utilise boronic acids. In particular, boronic acids have become increasingly important reagents for the facile construction of carbon-carbon and carbon-heteroatom bonds via metal-catalysed cross-coupling reactions. This has resulted in an increased usage of boronic acids, and subsequently followed by an increased number of reports concerning problematic protodeboronation. Many boronic acids are now commercially available and many novel boronic acids and derivatives are constantly in pursuit.

Many efforts have been put towards mitigating undesired protodeboronation in cross-coupling reactions. Catalyst design and optimisation has led the way for very efficient systems that can undergo rapid catalytic turnover. This increases the rate of productive reaction and thus subdues unwanted decomposition pathways such as protodeboronation. Cross-coupling reactions have also been accelerated with metal additives such as silver and copper.

Boronic acid derivatives have also been used to suppress protodeboronation. MIDA boronate esters and organotrifluoroborates have both been utilised in "slow release" strategies, in which the reaction conditions are optimised to provide a slow release of boronic acid. This protocol has proved useful in the cross-coupling of some notoriously unstable boronic acids, such as the 2-pyridine boronic acid. This ensures that the boronic acid concentration is low during the cross-coupling reaction, which in turn minimises the potential for side reactions.

== Reaction mechanism ==
=== Simple non-basic boronic acids ===
The mechanism of protodeboronation was initially investigated by Kuivila in the 1960s, long before the discovery of the Suzuki reaction and the popularisation of boronic acids. Their studies focused on the protodeboronation of some substituted aromatic boronic acids in aqueous conditions, and they reported the presence of two distinct mechanisms; a general acid-catalysed and a specific base-catalysed mechanism. The acid-catalysed process is dependent on a reaction between boronic acid and an acid, such as sulfuric acid. On the other hand, the base-catalysed process arises from a pre-equilibrium between boronic acid and hydroxide to form the corresponding boronate, this is usually followed by a rate-limiting reaction between boronate and water (acting as the proton source). Substrates that display only these two modes of protodeboronation (typically simple aromatic and alkyl boronic acids) are generally very stable in neutral pH solution, where both acid- and base-catalysed processes are minimised. For aromatic boronic acids bearing electron-withdrawing substituents, there is a competing dissociative mechanism involving generation of a transient aryl anion. These substrates are stabilized by acidic conditions.

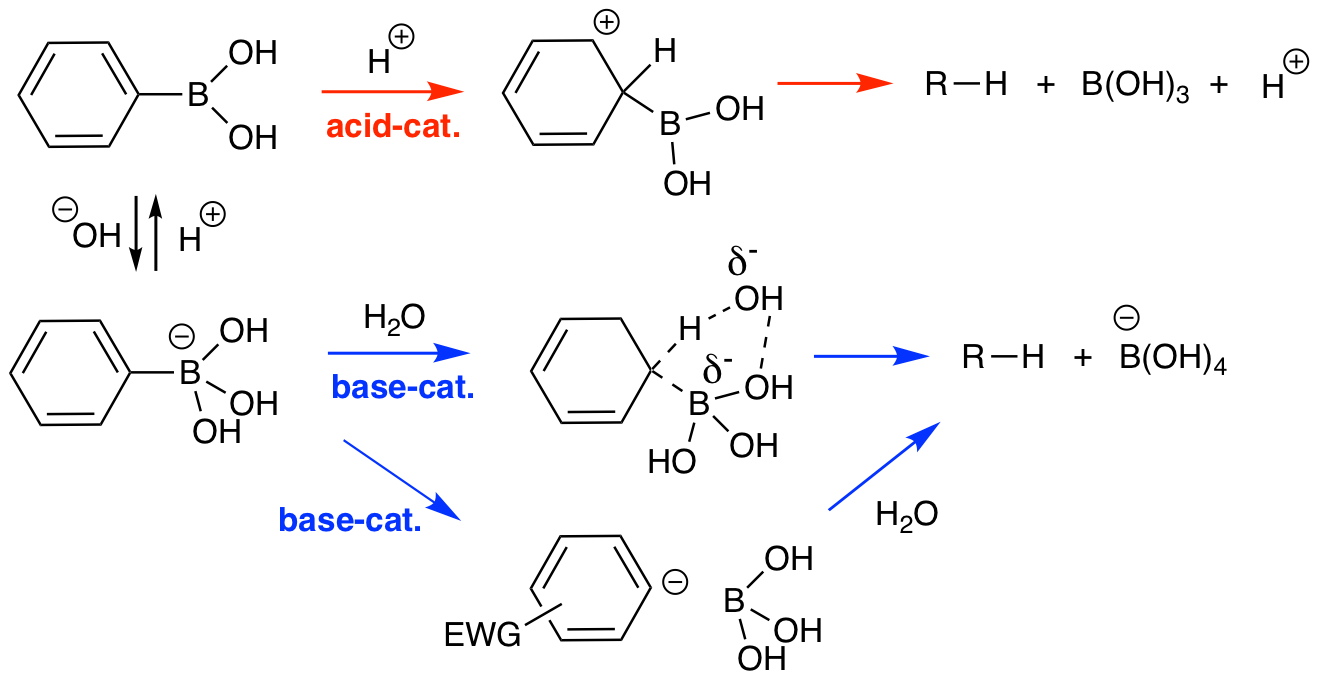
Acid and base catalyzed protodeboronation

=== Basic heteroaromatic boronic acids ===
Basic heteroaromatic boronic acids (boronic acids that contain a basic nitrogen atom, such as 2-pyridine boronic acid) display additional protodeboronation mechanisms. A key finding shows the speciation of basic heteroaromatic boronic acids to be analogous to that of simple amino acids, with zwitterionic species forming under neutral pH conditions. For the 2-pyridine boronic acid, the zwitterionic compound is responsible for its rapid protodeboronation under neutral pH, through a unimolecular fragmentation of the C-B bond. In fact, the addition of acid (H+) or hydroxide (OH-) acts to attenuate protodeboronation by shifting the speciation away from the reactive zwitterion.

Not all basic heteroaromatic boronic acids are reactive through a zwitterionic intermediate.

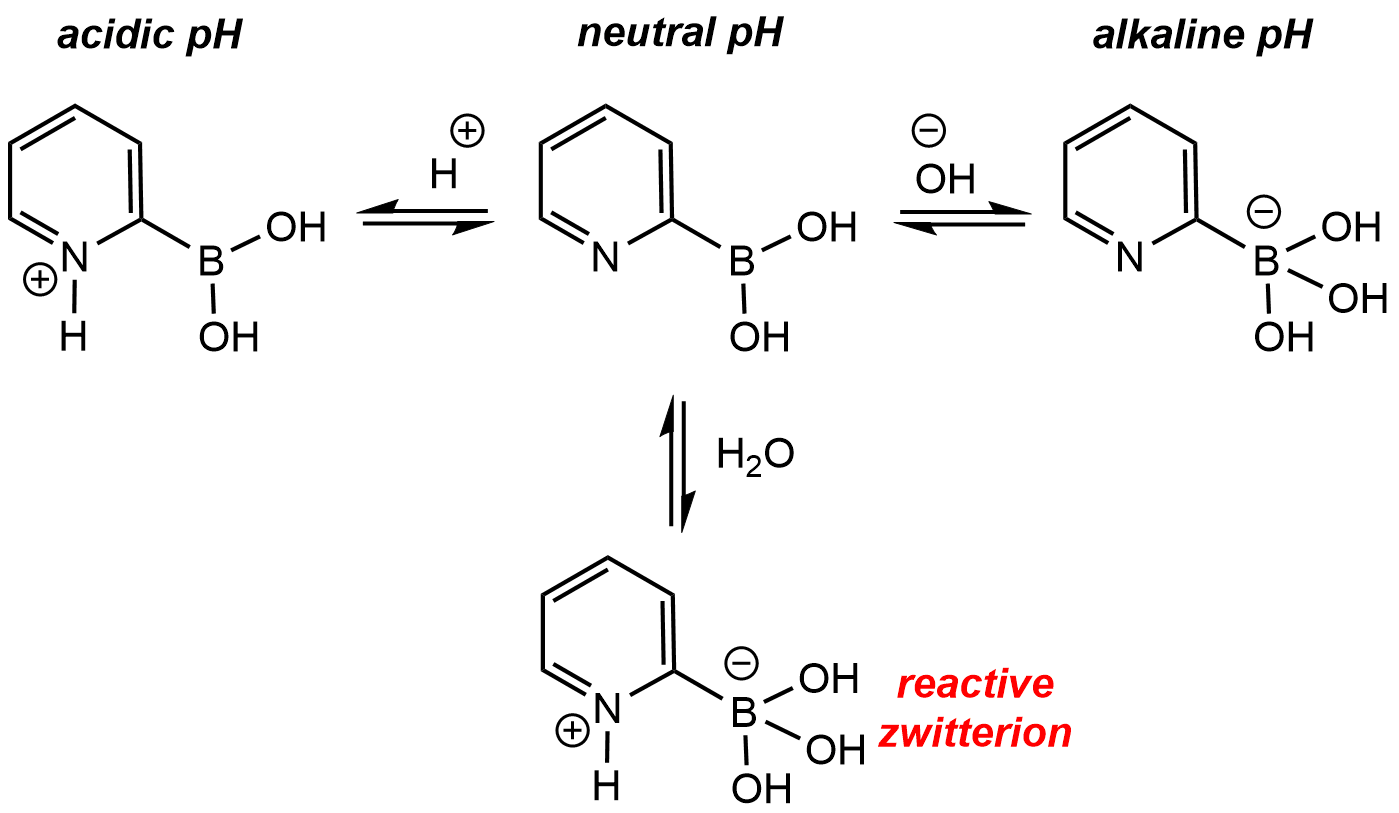
Scheme for the speciation of 2-pyridine boronic acid in aqueous solution

== See also ==
- Boronic acid
- Suzuki reaction
