= CBS catalyst =

Asymmetric catalyst derived from proline

Corey–Bakshi–Shibata catalyst

The CBS catalyst or Corey–Bakshi–Shibata catalyst is an asymmetric catalyst derived from proline. It finds many uses in organic reactions such as the CBS reduction, Diels-Alder reactions and (3+2) cycloadditions. Proline, a naturally occurring chiral compound, is readily and cheaply available. It transfers its stereocenter to the catalyst which in turn is able to drive an organic reaction selectively to one of two possible enantiomers. This selectivity is due to steric strain in the transition state that develops for one enantiomer but not for the other.

== Synthesis ==
The CBS catalyst can be prepared from diphenylprolinol, condensed with a phenylboronic acid, or with borane (as shown below). The CBS catalyst then complexes in situ with borane to give the active catalyst.

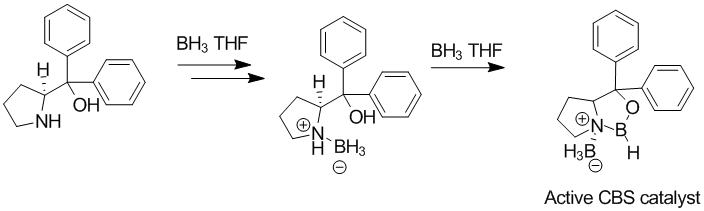

== Use ==
The general outline for the organic synthesis of a CBS catalyst is shown below. The first leg of the reaction sequence starts from the azeotropic dehydration of a boronic acid (1) such as one based on toluene to a boroxine (2). This boroxine reacts with the proline derivative (3d) to form the basic oxazaborolidine CBS catalyst (4). The oxazaborolidine was first developed as a ketone reducing agent by the laboratory of Itsuno, and thus is more properly called the Itsuno–Corey oxazaborolidine. Proline derivative 3d is prepared in a separate leg from a Grignard reaction with Grignard reagent 3c and proline ester 3b. A Lewis acid superacid salt (6) can be obtained with the aid of triflic acid (5). Many other such catalysts exist with different derivatives of these reactants.

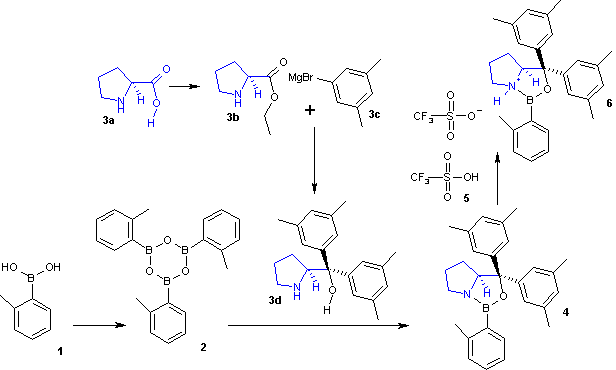
