= Dominic Chan (disambiguation) =

Dominic Chan (born 1952) is the Vicar general of the Roman Catholic Diocese of Hong Kong.

Dominic Chan may also refer to:

- Dominic Chan (politician), former Director of Audit of the Audit Commission of Hong Kong
- Dominic Chan (scientist) of Chan-Lam coupling
