= Rubicordifolin =

Names
- Preferred IUPAC name Methyl 5-hydroxy-2-[(2R,3aR,4R)-7-hydroxy-4-(2-hydroxypropan-2-yl)-2-methyl-6-oxo-2,3,3a,6-tetrahydro-4H-benzo[h]pyrano[3,4,5-de][1]benzopyran-2-yl]naphtho[1,2-b]furan-4-carboxylate

Identifiers
CAS Number	849699-55-4
3D model (JSmol)	Interactive image
ChemSpider	9961073
PubChem CID	11786393
UNII	ZCR8BY5KW4
CompTox Dashboard (EPA)	DTXSID601030377
- InChI: InChI=1S/C33H28O9/c1-32(2,38)29-20-14-33(3,42-28-18-12-8-6-10-16(18)26(35)24(22(20)28)31(37)41-29)21-13-19-23(30(36)39-4)25(34)15-9-5-7-11-17(15)27(19)40-21/h5-13,20,29,34-35,38H,14H2,1-4H3/t20-,29-,33-/m1/s1 Key: ZDZRMYBQJYWXBR-CXUYDDCUSA-N; InChI=1/C33H28O9/c1-32(2,38)29-20-14-33(3,42-28-18-12-8-6-10-16(18)26(35)24(22(20)28)31(37)41-29)21-13-19-23(30(36)39-4)25(34)15-9-5-7-11-17(15)27(19)40-21/h5-13,20,29,34-35,38H,14H2,1-4H3/t20-,29-,33-/m1/s1 Key: ZDZRMYBQJYWXBR-CXUYDDCUBY
- SMILES: O=C(OC)c2c(O)c1ccccc1c3oc(cc23)[C@@]7(Oc4c6c(c(O)c5c4cccc5)C(=O)O[C@H]([C@@H]6C7)C(O)(C)C)C

Properties
Chemical formula	C_{33}H_{28}O_{9}
Molar mass	568.578 g·mol^{−1}
- Except where otherwise noted, data are given for materials in their standard state (at 25 °C [77 °F], 100 kPa). Infobox references

Rubicordifolin is a natural product that is produced by Rubia cordifolia, a plant of the family Rubiaceae. The molecule is isolated from the roots of Rubia cordifolia and was first characterized in 1993. In 2004, the first synthesis of rubicordifolin was accomplished. The molecule has been shown to have cytotoxic properties in vitro.

== Biosynthesis ==
A biosynthetic pathway for rubicordifolin has not yet been elucidated. However, it has been hypothesized that the dimerization of the two naphthoquinone units yields rubicordifolin. Naphthoquinones can be traced back to the shikimate pathway in plants. Shikimate is converted into chorismic acid, which is further converted into 2-succinylbenzoic acid through a TPP-dependent reaction.

Biosynthesis of 2-succinylbenzoic acid via the shikimate pathway

After 2-succinylbenzoic acid has been produced, a cyclization, a prenylation, a methylation, and an oxidation occur which yields a naphthoquinone.

Once this naphthoquinone has been made, a series of oxidations and cyclizations lead to two substrates that can undergo a [4+2] cycloaddition that leads to the product.

== Synthesis ==
The Trauner group at UC Berkeley completed a synthesis of rubicordifolin in 2004. The synthesis of the natural product, dubbed a “biomimetic” synthesis, takes inspiration from the proposed dimerization of two naphthoquinones units. Mechanistically, it is proposed that the phenylboronic acid promotes a cyclization that is followed by a Diels-Alder reaction to yield the final product.

== Pharmacology ==
Studies of rubicordifolin demonstrate it possesses both cytotoxic properties. When tested in vitro against Chinese hamster lung fibroblasts, human nasopharynx carcinomas, and lymphocytic leukemia cells, rubicordifolin exhibited cytotoxic activities (measured in IC_{50}, μg/ml) of 4.7, 2.9, and 1.2 respectively.
