= Tetraacetyl diborate =

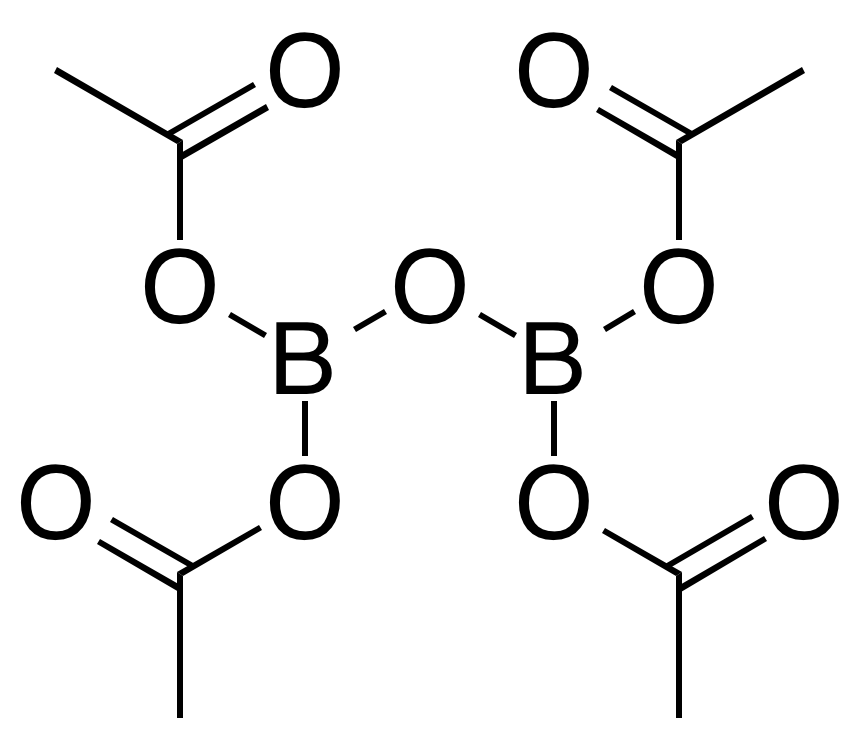

Names
- IUPAC name [acetyloxy(diacetyloxyboranyloxy)boranyl] acetate
- Other names: 1,3-Dibora-2-oxapropane-1,1,3,3-tetrol tetraacetate

Identifiers
CAS Number	5187-37-1
3D model (JSmol)	Interactive image
ChemSpider	4483734
PubChem CID	5326258
CompTox Dashboard (EPA)	DTXSID80416100
- InChI: InChI=1S/C8H12B2O9/c1-5(11)15-9(16-6(2)12)19-10(17-7(3)13)18-8(4)14/h1-4H3 Key: ZMJHYNIVOZEJTJ-UHFFFAOYSA-N
- SMILES: CC(=O)OB(OB(OC(C)=O)OC(C)=O)OC(C)=O

Properties
Chemical formula	C_{8}H_{12}B_{2}O_{9}
Molar mass	273.80 g·mol^{−1}
Appearance	Colorless needles
Melting point	147 °C (297 °F; 420 K)
Solubility	Soluble in most organic solvents

Hazards
Flash point	Not flammable
- Except where otherwise noted, data are given for materials in their standard state (at 25 °C [77 °F], 100 kPa). Infobox references

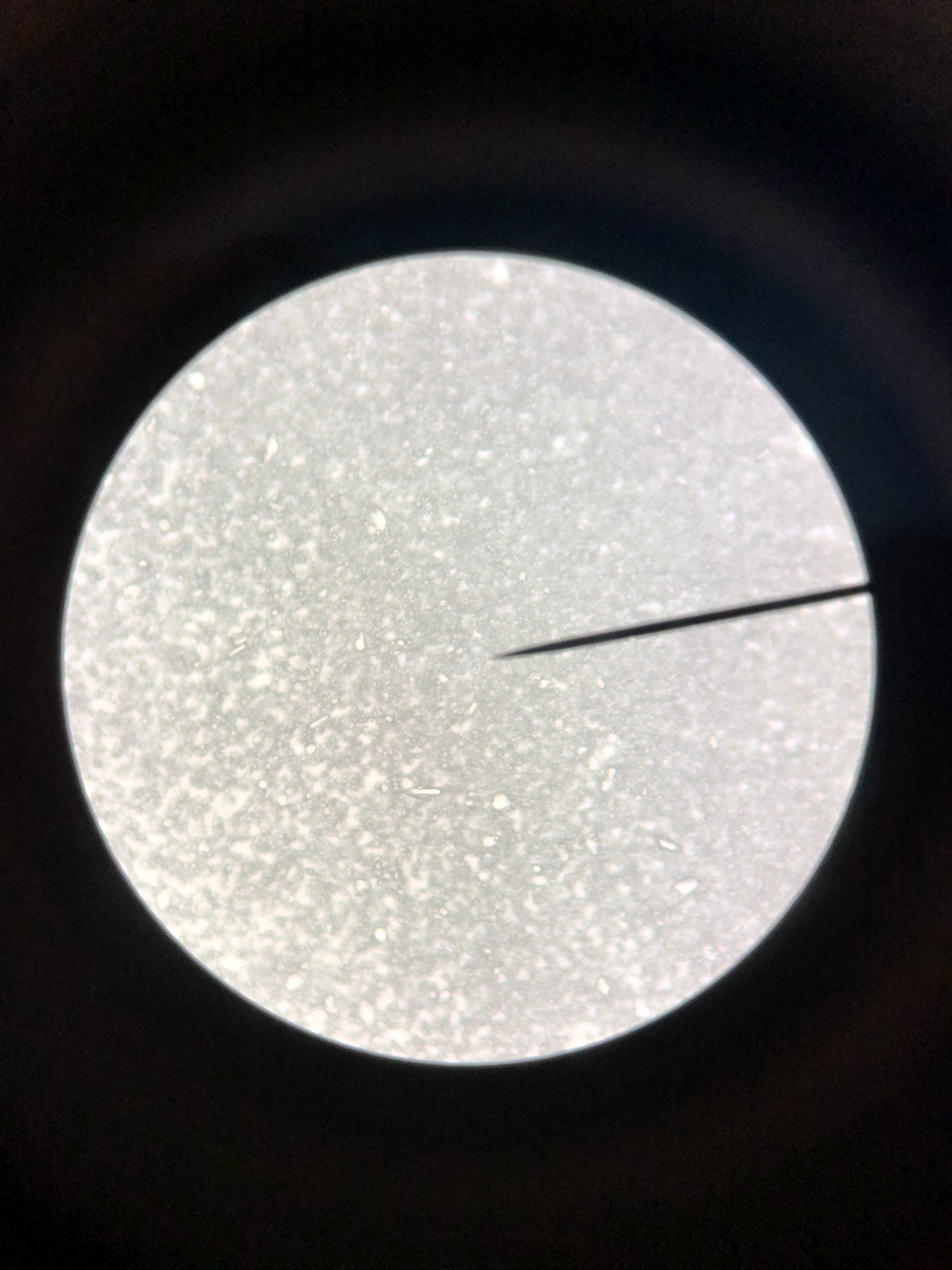
Tetraacetyl Diborate crystals observed under a microscope.

Tetraacetyl diborate is an organoboron compound with the molecular formula (CH_{3}COO)_{2}BOB(CH_{3}COO)_{2}.

== Preparation ==
It is not well known and was discovered accidentally by an attempt trying to make boron triacetate in the 1950s. It was made by reacting boric acid and acetic anhydride around 75 °C (167 °F) under nitrogen which created tetraacetyl diborate and acetic acid. It crystallized as a colorless solid.

2H_{3}BO_{3} + 5(CH3CO)_{2}O → (CH_{3}COO)_{2}BOB(CH_{3}COO)_{2} + 6CH_{3}COOH

== Reactions ==
Tetraacetyl diborate reacts with methanol to form water and diacetyl methoxyboron.
