= Organoboron chemistry =

Study of compounds containing a boron-carbon bond

Organoboron

Organoboron chemistry or organoborane chemistry studies organoboron compounds, also called organoboranes. These chemical compounds combine boron and carbon; typically, they are organic derivatives of borane (BH_{3}), as in the trialkyl boranes.

Organoboranes and -borates enable many chemical transformations in organic chemistry — most importantly, hydroboration and carboboration. Most reactions transfer a nucleophilic boron substituent to an electrophilic center either inter- or intramolecularly. In particular, α,β-unsaturated borates and borates with an α leaving group are highly susceptible to intramolecular 1,2-migration of a group from boron to the electrophilic α position. Oxidation or protonolysis of the resulting organoboranes generates many organic products, including alcohols, carbonyl compounds, alkenes, and halides.

== Properties of the B-C bond ==
The C-B bond has low polarity (electronegativity 2.55 for carbon and 2.04 for boron). Alkyl boron compounds are in general stable, though easily oxidized.

Boron often forms electron-deficient compounds without a full octet, such as the triorganoboranes. These compounds are strong electrophiles, but typically too sterically hindered to dimerize. Electron donation from vinyl and aryl groups can lend the C-B bond some double bond character.

== Classes of organoboron compounds ==
=== Organoboranes ===
Structure of a rare monomeric boron hydride, R = i-Pr.

The most-studied class of organoboron compounds has the formula BR_{n}H_{3−n}. These compounds are catalysts, reagents, and synthetic intermediates. Except a few bulky derivatives, the primary and secondary hydrides (n = 1 or 2) are, like diborane itself, strongly Lewis acidic and dimerize in condensed phases. The trialkyl and triaryl derivatives, e.g. triethylboron, are typically only weakly Lewis acidic, and form monomers with a trigonal, planar boron center.

Monoalkyl boranes are relatively rare. When the alkyl group is small, such as methyl, monoalkylboranes often redistribute to mixtures of diborane and di- and trialkylboranes. One example of an isolable (bulky) primary borane is thexylborane (ThxBH_{2}), produced by the hydroboration of tetramethylethylene: A chiral example is monoisopinocampheylborane, obtained by hydroboration of (−)‐α‐pinene with borane dimethyl sulfide. Although often written as IpcBH_{2}, it is a dimer, [IpcBH_{2}]_{2}.

Dialkylboranes are also rare with small alkyls. One common preparation reduces dialkylhalogenoboranes with metal hydrides. An important application in organic synthesis is transmetallation to form organozinc compounds. Nevertheless, some diaryl and dialkylboranes are well known. Dimesitylborane is a dimer (C_{6}H_{2}Me_{3})_{4}B_{2}H_{2}) that reacts only slowly with simple terminal alkenes. It adds to alkynes to give alkenylboranes. A hindered dialkylborane is disiamylborane, abbreviated Sia_{2}BH, also a dimer. Owing to its steric bulk, it selectively hydroborates less hindered, usually terminal alkenes in the presence of more substituted alkenes. Disiamylborane must be freshly prepared as its solutions can only be stored at 0 °C for a few hours. Dicyclohexylborane Cy_{2}BH exhibits better thermal stability than Sia_{2}BH.

A versatile dialkylborane is 9-BBN. Also called "banana borane", it exists as a dimer. It can be distilled without decomposition at 195 °C (12mm Hg). Reactions with 9-BBN typically occur at 60–80 °C, with most alkenes reacting within one hour. Tetrasubstituted alkenes add 9-BBN at elevated temperature. Hydroboration of alkenes with 9-BBN proceeds with excellent regioselectivity. It is more sensitive to steric differences than Sia_{2}BH, perhaps because of it rigid C_{8} backbone. 9-BBN is more reactive towards alkenes than alkynes.

=== Oxyacids and esters ===
Compounds of the type BR_{n}(OR)_{3-n} are called borinic esters (n = 2), boronic esters (n = 1), and borates (n = 0). Boronic acids are key to the Suzuki reaction. Trimethyl borate, debatably not an organoboron compound, is an intermediate in sodium borohydride production.

=== Adducts ===
Boranes and borinic, boronic, and borate esters all form adducts with appropriate Lewis bases.

Strong bases do not deprotonate boranes of the form R_{2}BH. Instead these reactions afford the octet-complete adduct R_{2}HB-base.

NHCs and boranes form stable NHC-borane adducts. Triethylborane adducts can be synthesised directly from the imidazolium salt and lithium triethylborohydride.

=== Polyhedral clusters ===
Boron is renowned for cluster species, e.g. dodecaborate [B_{12}H_{12}]^{2-}. Such clusters have many organic derivatives. One example is [B_{12}(CH_{3})_{12}]^{2-} and its radical derivative [B_{12}(CH_{3})_{12}]^{−}. Related cluster compounds with carbon vertices are carboranes; the best known is orthocarborane, C_{2}B_{10}H_{12}. Carboranes have few commercial applications. Anionic derivatives such as [C_{2}B_{9}H_{11}]^{2−}, called dicarbollides, ligate similarly to cyclopentadienide.

Borane cluster structures are built from the triangular (BR)_{3} unit, which is almost unknown in isolation. However, the corresponding aromatic dianion, (BR)^{2−}_{3}, forms from careful dehalogenation of a RNBCl_{2} species.

=== Boryl complexes and radicals ===
Organometallic compounds with metal-boron bonds (M–BR_{2}) are boryl complexes, corresponding to the notional boryl anion R_{2}B^{−}, although the latter cannot be produced through deprotonation (see § Adducts). In one synthesis, the boryl anion moiety arose through lithium-halogen exchange:

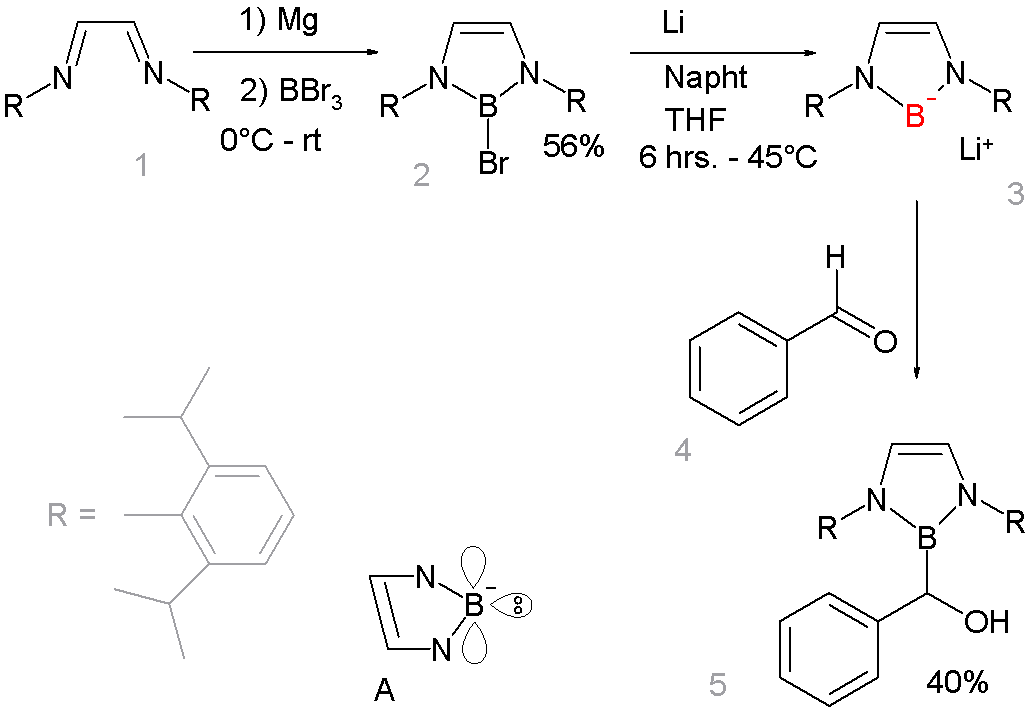

As shown, the product is isoelectronic to an N-heterocyclic carbene.

Related ligands are borylenes (M–B(R)–M).

=== Unsaturated compounds ===
Alkylideneboranes (RB=CRR) with a boron–carbon double bond are rare. One example, HB=CH_{2}, can be detected at low temperature. The derivative CH_{3}B=C(SiMe_{3})_{2} is fairly stable, but prone to cyclodimerisation. Alkylideneboron anions, zwitterions, or mesoions are somewhat easier to form, occurring whenever other substituents β to boron stabilize a carbanion α to it.

Some boron-substituted heterocycles are aromatic, but very few such arenes are stable. In borabenzene, boron replaces one CH center in benzene. Borabenzene and derivatives invariably appear as adducts, e.g., C_{5}H_{5}B-pyridine. The cyclic compound borole, a structural analog of pyrrole, has not been isolated, but substituted derivatives (boroles) are known. The cyclic compound borepin has been isolated and is aromatic.

Boron-boron multiple bonds are rare, although doubly-bonded dianions have been known since the 1990s. Neutral analogues use NHC adducts, such as the following diborane(2) derivative:

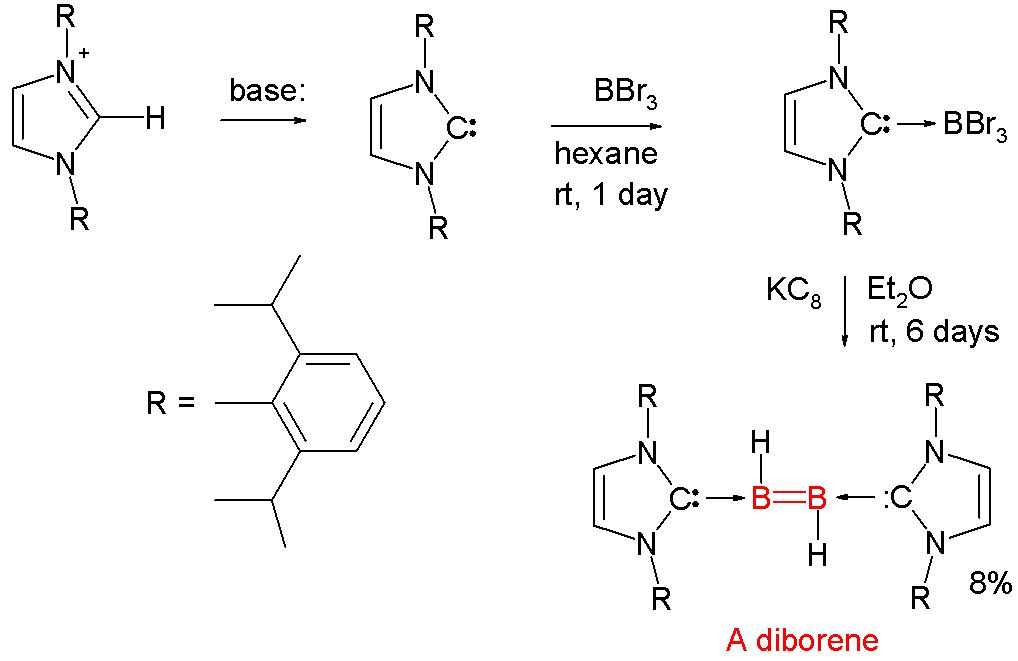

Each boron atom has an attached proton and is coordinated to a NHC carbene.

A reported diboryne and boranylium ions are based on similar chemistry,

A compound with the B≡C triple bond was synthesized for the first time in 2025.

== Synthesis ==
=== From Grignard reagents ===
Simple organoboranes such as triethylborane or tris(pentafluorophenyl)boron can be prepared from trifluoroborane (in ether) and the ethyl or pentafluorophenyl Grignard reagent. Further carbanion addition will effect a borate (R_{4}B^{−}).

Boronic acids RB(OH)_{2} react with potassium bifluoride K[HF_{2}] to form trifluoroborate salts K[RBF_{3}], precursors to nucleophilic alkyl and aryl boron difluorides, ArBF_{2}:

=== From alkenes ===
In hydroboration, alkenes insert into borane B-H bonds, with anti-Markovnikov stereochemistry. Hydroboration occurs stereospecifically syn — on the same alkene face. The transition state for this concerted reaction can be visualized as a square with the corners occupied by carbon, carbon, hydrogen and boron, maximizing overlap between the olefin p-orbitals and the empty boron orbital.

Hydroboration with borane (BH_{3}) equivalents converts only 33% of the starting olefin to product — boron-containing byproducts consume the remainder. The chelate effect improves that ratio for cyclic boron-containing reagents. One common cyclic organoboron reagent is 9-BBN.

=== By borylation ===
Metal-catalyzed borylation reactions produce an organoboron compound from aliphatic or aromatic C-H sigma bonds via a transition-metal catalyst. A common reagent is bis(pinacolato)diboron.

=== From other boron compounds ===
Carbon monoxide reacts with alkylboranes to form an unstable borane carbonyl. Then an alkyl substituent migrates from boron to the carbonyl carbon. For example, homologated primary alcohols result from organoboranes, carbon monoxide, and a reducing agent (here, sodium borohydride):

==== Alkenylboranes ====
Alkynylboranes attack electrophiles to give trans alkenylboranes, as in the first step of this olefin synthesis:

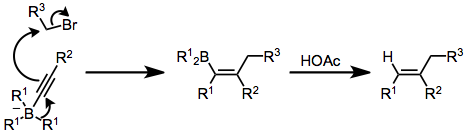

== Reactions ==
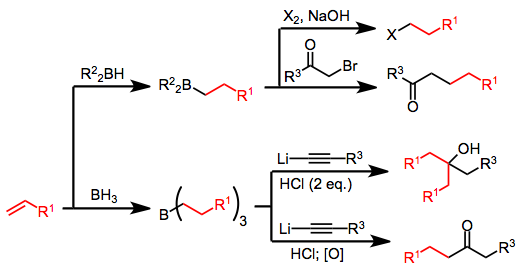
Overall synthetic routes via organoboron compounds

As H. C. Brown's Nobel Prize indicates, hydroboration is widely practiced because alkylboranes undergo many useful reactions.

The key property of organoboranes (R_{3}B) and borates (R_{4}B^{−}, generated via addition of R^{−} to R_{3}B) is their susceptibility to reorganization. These compounds possess boron–carbon bonds polarized toward carbon. The boron-attached carbon is nucleophilic; in borates, the nucleophicity suffices for intermolecular transfer to an electrophile.

Boranes alone are generally not nucleophilic enough to transfer an R group intermolecularly. Instead, the group 1,2-migrates to an electrophilic carbon attached to boron, especially if that carbon is unsaturated or bears a good leaving group:

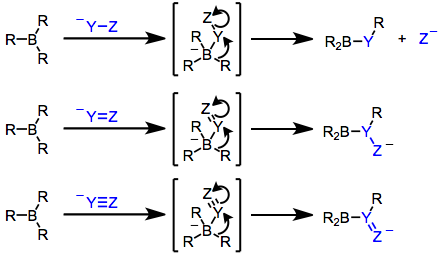

An organic group's migration propensity depends on its ability to stabilize negative charge: alkynyl > aryl ≈ alkenyl > primary alkyl > secondary alkyl > tertiary alkyl. Bis(norbornyl)borane and 9-BBN are often hydroboration reagents for this reason — only the hydroborated olefin is likely to migrate upon nucleophilic activation.

Migration retains configuration at the migrant carbon and inverts it at the (presumably sp^{3}-hybridized) terminus. The resulting reorganized borane can then be oxidized or protolyzed to a final product.

=== Protonolysis ===
Organoboranes are unstable to Brønsted–Lowry acids, deboronating in favor of a proton. Consequently, organoboranes are easily removed from an alkane or alkene substrate, as in the second step of this olefin synthesis:

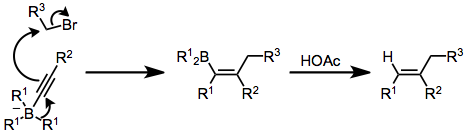

=== Addition to halocarbonyls ===
α-Halo enolates are common nucleophiles in borane reorganization. After nucleophilic attack at boron, the resulting ketoboronate eliminates the halogen and tautomerizes to a neutral enolborane. A functionalized carbonyl compound then results from protonolysis, or quenching with other electrophiles:

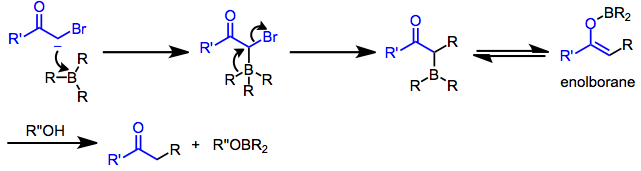

Because the migration is stereospecific, this method synthesizes enantiopure α-alkyl or -aryl ketones.

α-Haloester enolates add similarly to boranes, but with lower yields:

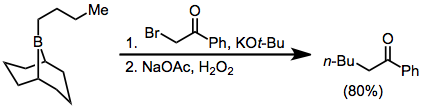

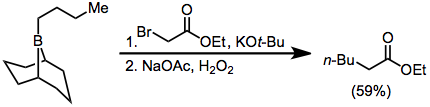

Diazoesters and diazoketones remove the requirement for external base. α,α'-Dihalo enolates react with boranes to form α-halo carbonyl compounds that can be further functionalized at the α position.

=== Addition to carbonyl functional groups ===
In 1993, N. A. Petasis and I. Akritopoulou reported an efficient synthesis of allylic amines with a modified Mannich reaction, in which vinylboronic acids participate as nucleophiles. This modified Mannich reaction has become known as the Petasis-Mannich reaction:

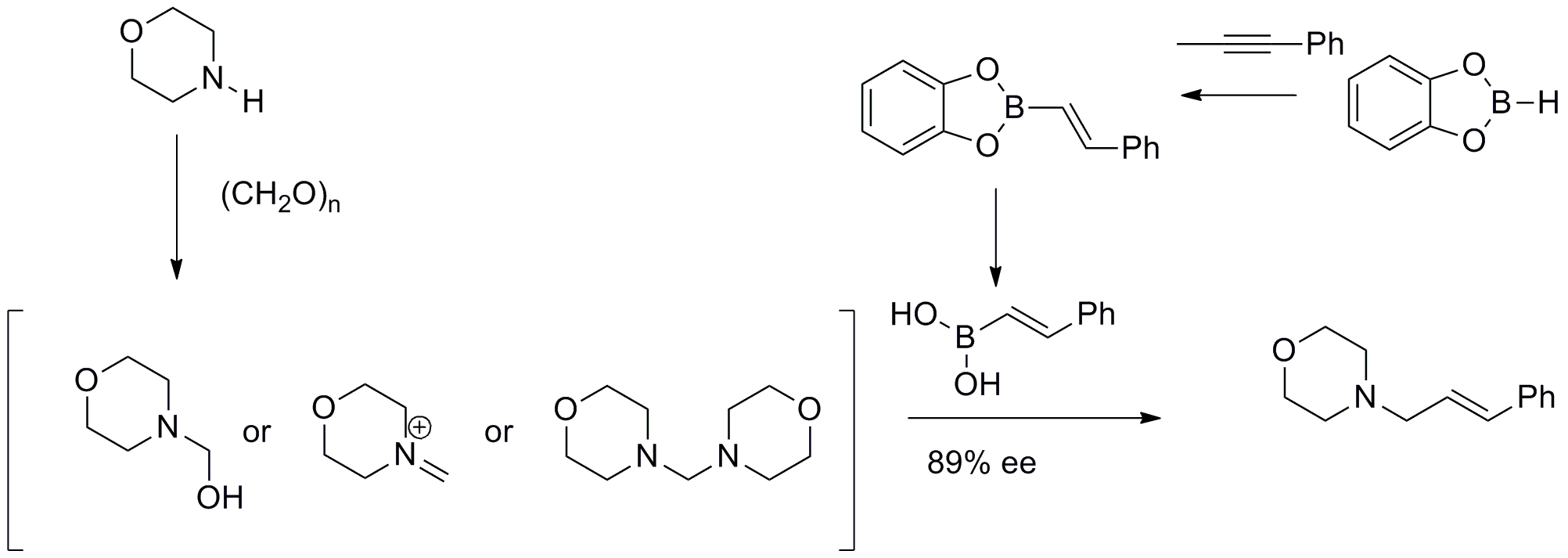
Petasis boronic acid-Mannich reaction

In allylboration, an allylborane adds across an aldehyde or ketone with an allylic shift, and can then be converted to a homoallylic alcohol during workup. The reaction is much slower with ketones than aldehydes. For example, in Nicolaou's epothilones synthesis, asymmetric allylboration (with an allylborane derived from chiral alpha-pinene) is the first step in a two-carbon homologation to acetogenin:

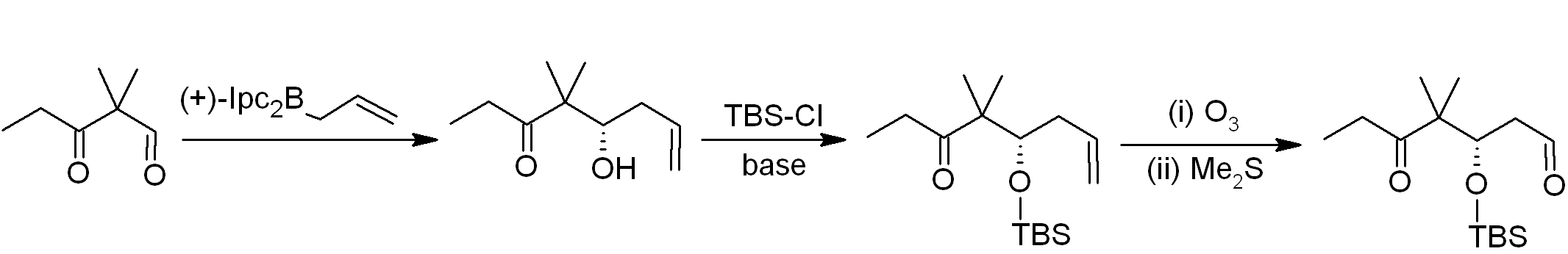

Trifluoroborate salts are stabler than boronic acids and selectively alkylate aldehydes:

There has been extensive study on asymmetric allylboration. In 1978, R. W. Hoffmann and T. Herold reported on the enantioselective synthesis of secondary homoallyl alcohols via chiral non-racemic allylboronic esters. The homoallylic alcohols were formed with excellent yield and moderate enantioselectivity.

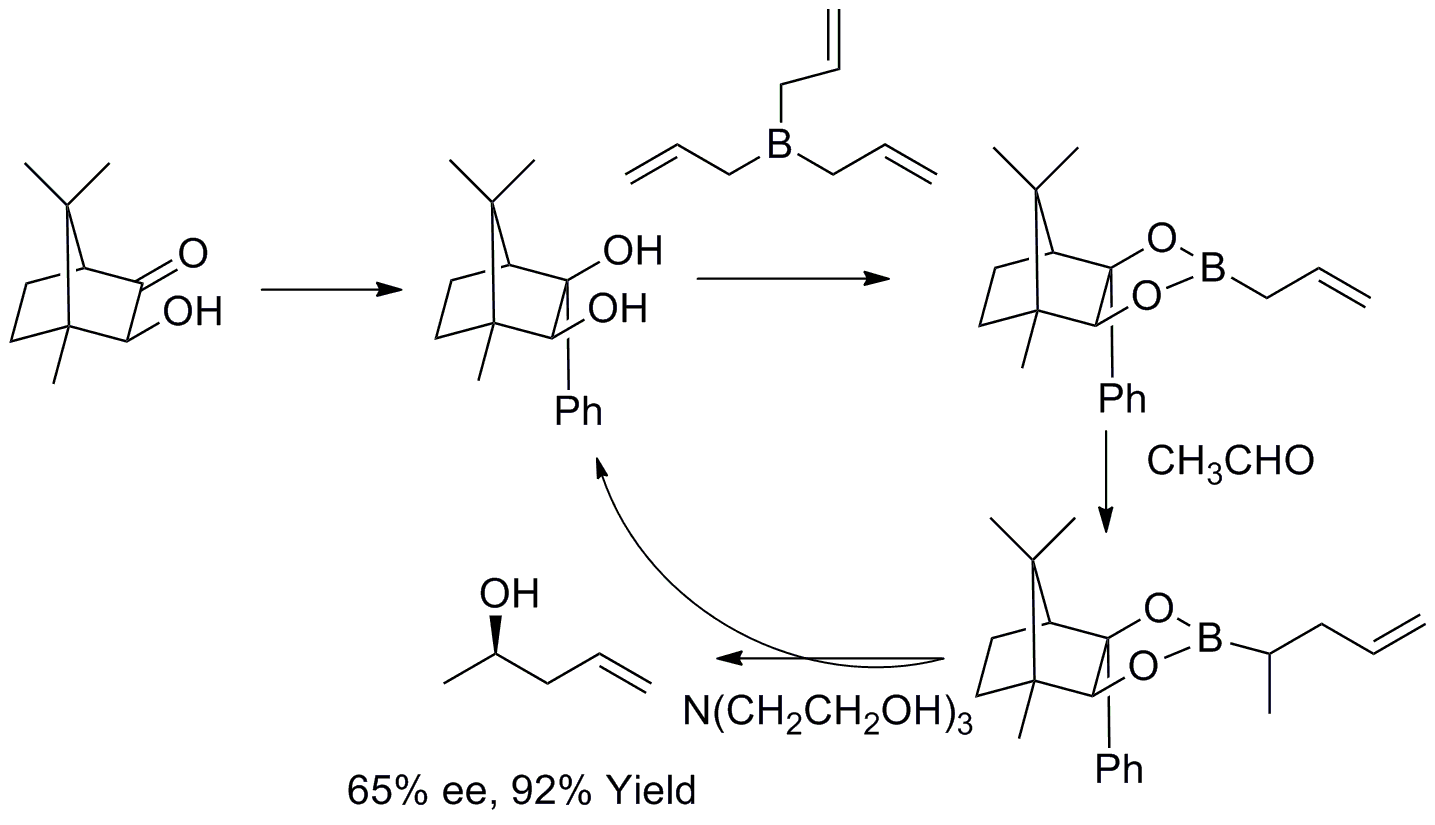
Roush Asymmetric Allylation-1

In 1985, W. R. Roush and co-workers found out that tartrate modified allylic boronates offer a simple, highly attractive approach to the control of facial selectivity in reactions with chiral and achiral aldehydes. In the following years, W.R. Roush and co-workers extended this strategy to the synthesis of but-2-ene-1,4-diols and anti-diols. This kind of reaction is known as Rouch asymmetric allylation.

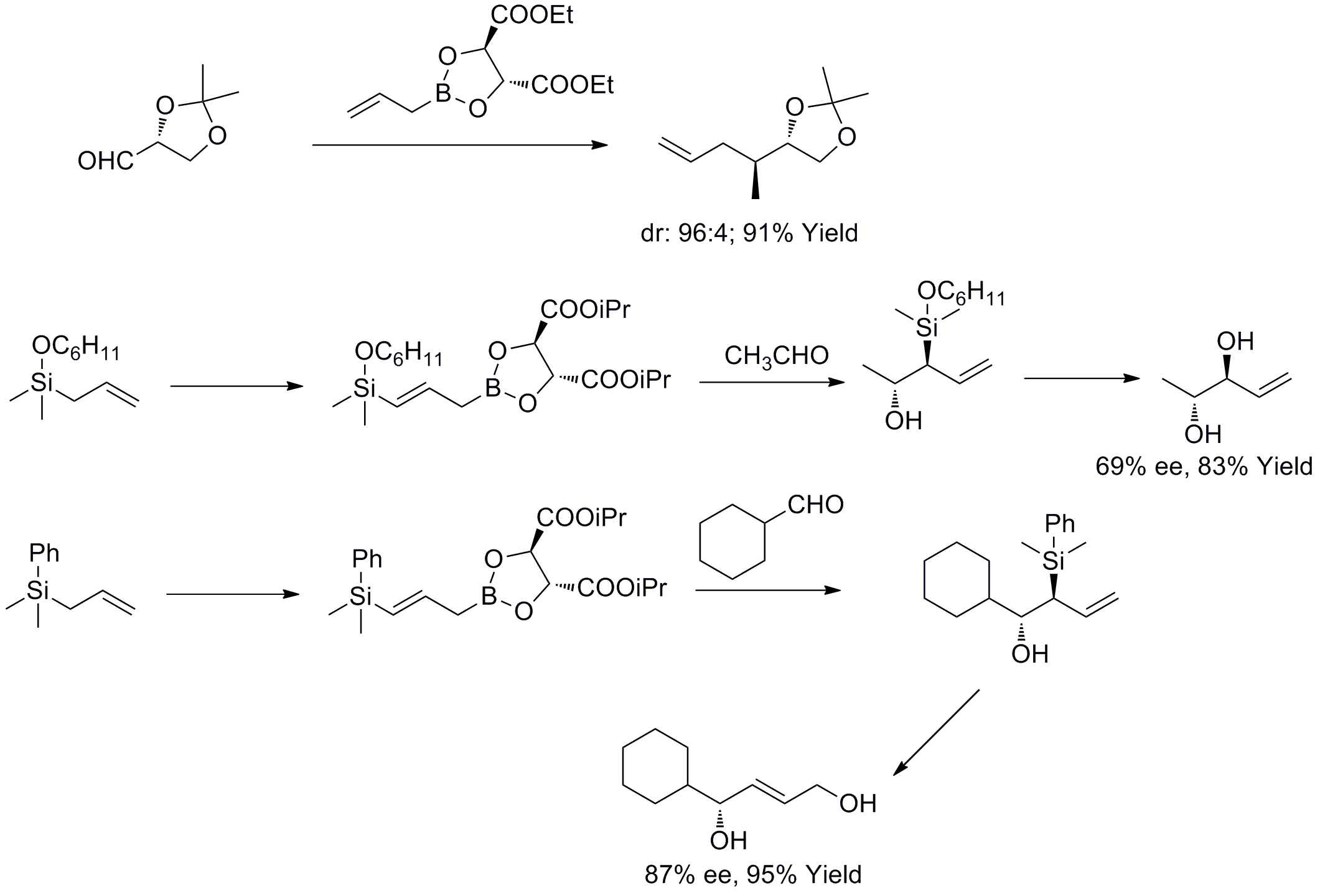
Roush asymmetric allylation-2

=== Oxygenation ===
Treatment of alkylboranes with base and hydrogen peroxide gives alcohols:

Regiospecific hydroboration with borane

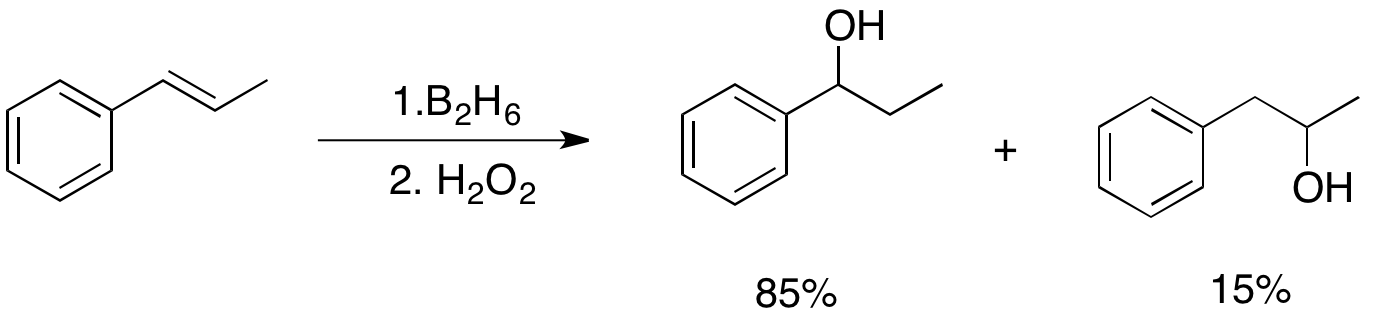
Hydroboration-oxidation of (E)-prop-1-en-1-ylbenzene

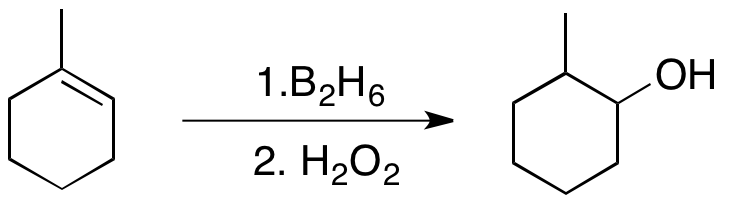
Hydroboration-oxidation of 1-methyl-cyclohex-1-ene

The net reaction is hydration. An analogous reaction with chromium oxide oxidizes the compound to a carbonyl (typically, aldehyde).

Because the addition of H-B to olefins is stereospecific, this oxidation reaction will be diastereoselective when the alkene is trisubstituted. Hydroboration-oxidation is thus an excellent way of producing alcohols in a stereospecific and anti-Markovnikov fashion.

Oxidation of an alkenylborane gives a boron-free enol.

=== Amination ===
Similar to oxygenation, electrophilic amination reagents (e.g., monochloramine or O-hydroxylaminesulfonic acid) convert organoboranes to amines.

=== Halogenation ===
Organoborane activation with hydroxide or alkoxide and treatment with X_{2} yields haloalkanes. With excess base, two of the three alkyl groups attached to the boron atom may convert to halide, but disiamylborane permits only halogenation of the hydroborated olefin:

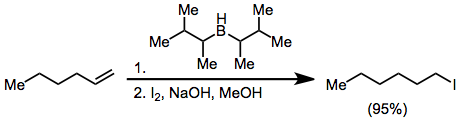

Treatment of an alkenylborane with iodine or bromine induces migration of a boron-attached organic group. Alkynyl groups migrate selectively, forming enynes after treatment with sodium acetate and hydrogen peroxide:

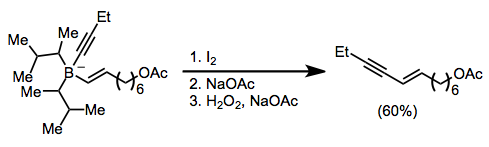

Such reactions have not however proven very popular, because succinimide based reagents such as NIS and NBS are more versatile and do not require rigorous conditions as do organoboranes.

=== Transmetalation and coupling ===
Organoboron compounds also transmetalate easily, especially to organopalladium compounds. In the Suzuki reaction, an aryl- or vinyl-boronic acid couples to an aryl- or vinyl-halide or triflate through a palladium(0) complex catalyst:
$$\ce{R1-BY2{} + R2-X -> [\underset{catalyst} {Pd}][\text{Base}] R1-R2}$$
For example:

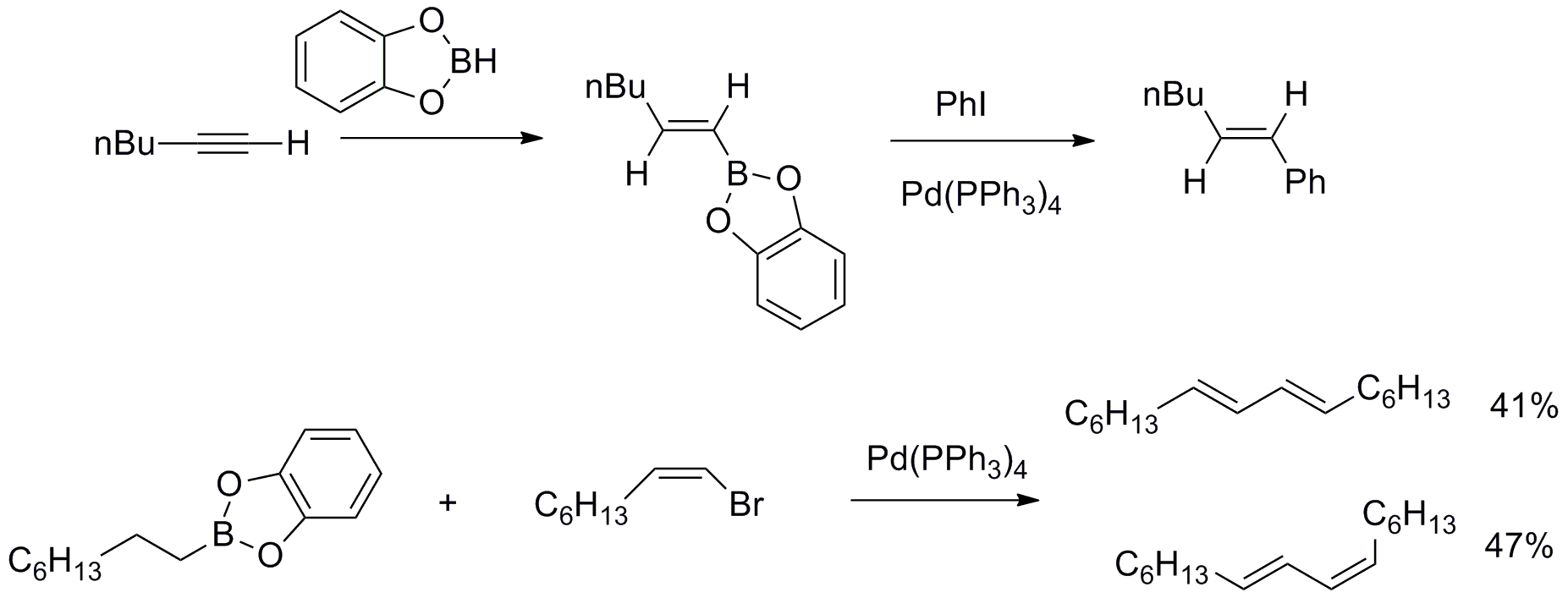
Suzuki-Miyaura Cross-Coupling

In a variant on the Ullmann coupling, copper and atmospheric oxygen catalyze nucleophilic substitution of potassium aryltrifluoroborates:

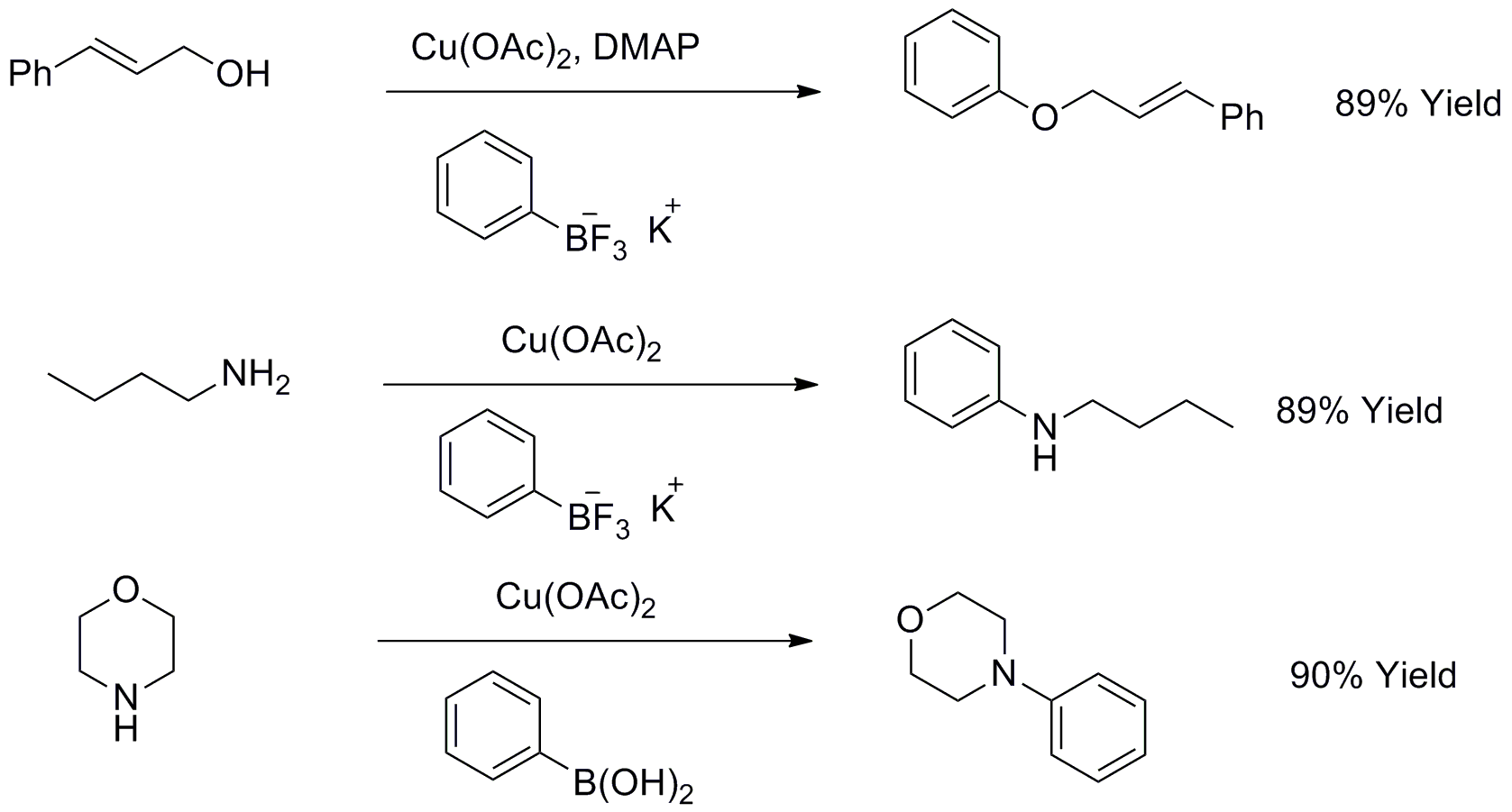
Modified Ullmann biaryl ether and biaryl amine synthesis

=== Reducing agents ===
Borane hydrides such as 9-BBN and L-selectride (lithium tri(sec-butyl)borohydride) are reducing agents. An asymmetric catalyst for carbonyl reductions is the CBS catalyst, which relies on boron coordination to the carbonyl oxygen.

== Other synthetic applications ==
=== Alcohols ===
Homologated primary alcohols result from the treatment of organoboranes with carbon monoxide and a hydride:

Tertiary alcohols with two identical groups attached to the alcohol carbon may be synthesized through an alkynylborane double migration:

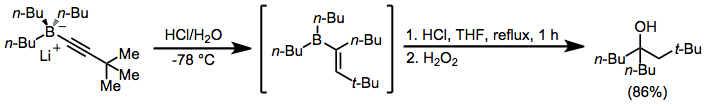

=== Carbonyl groups ===
Organoborate anions reductively eliminate against acyl halides. Here, the borate was generated from tri(cyclopentyl)borane and phenyllithium; the three cyclopentyl groups do not significantly migrate:

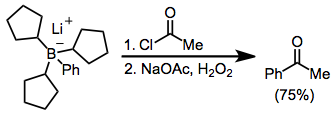

=== Alkenes ===
Similar to the Peterson olefination, anionic borenes react with carbonyls to form alkenes.

== Applications ==
Organoboron chemistry is mainly of commercial value in the pharmaceutical industry.

Triethylborane was used to ignite the JP-7 fuel of the Pratt & Whitney J58 variable cycle engines powering the Lockheed SR-71 Blackbird.

Organoboron compounds have long been discussed for use as boron delivery agents in neutron capture therapy of cancer.
