= Phenylboronic acid =

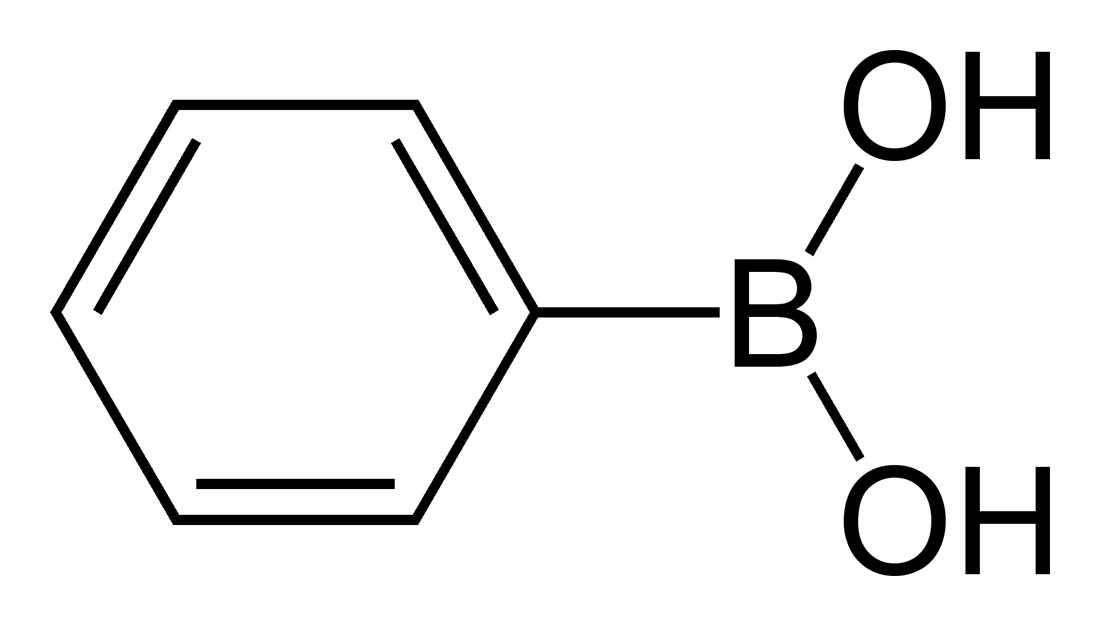

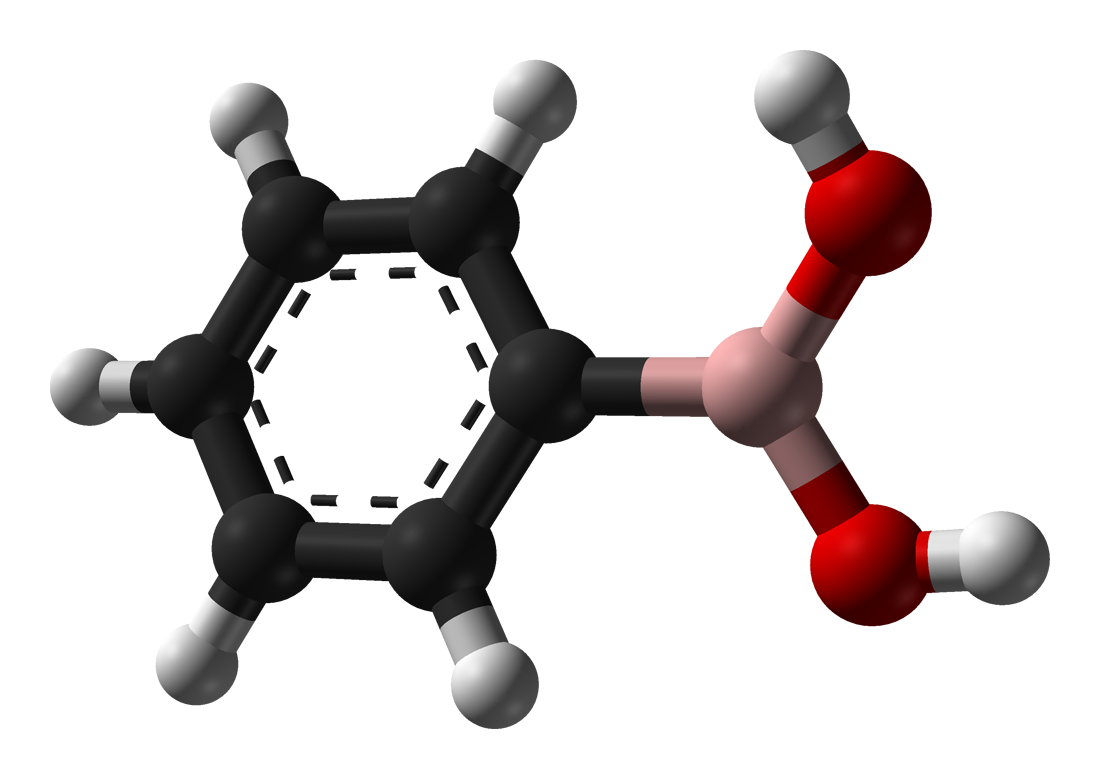

Names
- Preferred IUPAC name Phenylboronic acid

Identifiers
CAS Number	98-80-6
3D model (JSmol)	Interactive image
Beilstein Reference	970972
ChEBI	CHEBI:44923
ChEMBL	ChEMBL21485
ChemSpider	60191
DrugBank	DB01795
ECHA InfoCard	100.002.456
EC Number	202-701-9
Gmelin Reference	3328
PubChem CID	66827
UNII	L12H7B02G5
CompTox Dashboard (EPA)	DTXSID9059179
- InChI: InChI=1S/C6H7BO2/c8-7(9)6-4-2-1-3-5-6/h1-5,8-9H Key: HXITXNWTGFUOAU-UHFFFAOYSA-N; InChI=1/C6H7BO2/c8-7(9)6-4-2-1-3-5-6/h1-5,8-9H Key: HXITXNWTGFUOAU-UHFFFAOYAQ
- SMILES: B(c1ccccc1)(O)O

Properties
Chemical formula	C_{6}H_{7}BO_{2}
Molar mass	121.93 g·mol^{−1}
Appearance	white to yellow powder
Odor	odorless
Melting point	216 °C (421 °F; 489 K)
Solubility in water	10 g/L (20 °C)
Solubility	soluble in diethyl ether, ethanol
Acidity (pK_{a})	8.83

Thermochemistry
Std enthalpy of formation (Δ_{f}H^{⦵}_{298})	-719.6 kJ/mol

Hazards
- GHS labelling
Pictograms	(GHS07: Exclamation mark)
Signal word	Warning
Hazard statements	H302
Precautionary statements	P261, P264, P270, P271, P280, P301+P312, P302+P352, P304+P340, P305+P351+P338, P312, P321, P330, P332+P313, P337+P313, P362, P403+P233, P405, P501
- Lethal dose or concentration (LD, LC)
LD_{50} (median dose)	740 mg/kg (rat, oral)
- Safety data sheet (SDS)
- Except where otherwise noted, data are given for materials in their standard state (at 25 °C [77 °F], 100 kPa). verify (what is ?) Infobox references

Phenylboronic acid or benzeneboronic acid, abbreviated as PhB(OH)_{2} where Ph is the phenyl group C_{6}H_{5}- and B(OH)_{2} is a boronic acid containing a phenyl substituent and two hydroxyl groups attached to boron. Phenylboronic acid is a white powder and is commonly used in organic synthesis. Boronic acids are mild Lewis acids which are generally stable and easy to handle, making them important in organic synthesis.

== Properties ==
Phenylboronic acid is soluble in most polar organic solvents and is poorly soluble in hexanes and carbon tetrachloride. This planar compound has idealized C_{2V} molecular symmetry. The boron atom is sp^{2}-hybridized and contains an empty p-orbital. The orthorhombic crystals use hydrogen bonding to form units made up of two molecules. These dimeric units are combined to give an extended hydrogen-bonded network. The molecule is planar with a minor bend around the C-B bond of 6.6° and 21.4° for the two PhB(OH)_{2} molecules.

== Synthesis ==
Numerous methods exist to synthesize phenylboronic acid. One of the most common synthesis uses phenylmagnesium bromide and trimethyl borate to form the ester PhB(OMe)_{2}, which is then hydrolyzed to the product.

PhMgBr + B(OMe)_{3} → PhB(OMe)_{2} + MeOMgBr
PhB(OMe)_{2} + H_{2}O → PhB(OH)_{2} + MeOH

Other routes to phenylboronic acid involve electrophilic borates to trap phenylmetal intermediates from phenyl halides or from directed ortho-metalation. Phenylsilanes and phenylstannanes transmetalate with BBr_{3}, followed by hydrolysis form phenylboronic acid. Aryl halides or triflates can be coupled with diboronyl reagents using transition metal catalysts. Aromatic C-H functionalization can also be done using transition metal catalysts.

== Reactions ==
The dehydration of boronic acids gives boroxines, the trimeric anhydrides of phenylboronic acid. The dehydration reaction is driven thermally, sometimes with a dehydration agent.

Phenylboronic acid participates in numerous cross coupling reactions where it serves as a source of a phenyl group. One example is the Suzuki reaction where, in the presence of a Pd(0) catalyst and base, phenylboronic acid and vinyl halides are coupled to produce phenyl alkenes. This method was generalized to a route producing biaryls by coupling phenylboronic acid with aryl halides.

C-C bond forming processes commonly use phenylboronic acid as a reagent. Alpha-amino acids can be generated using the uncatalyzed reaction between alpha-ketoacids, amines, and phenylboronic acid. Heck-type cross coupling of phenylboronic acid and alkenes and alkynes has been demonstrated.

Aryl azides and nitroaromatics can also be generated from phenylboronic acid. Phenylboronic acid can also be regioselectively halodeboronated using aqueous bromine, chlorine, or iodine:

PhB(OH)_{2} + Br_{2} + H_{2}O → PhBr + B(OH)_{3} + HBr

Boronic esters result from the condensation of boronic acids with alcohols. This transformation is simply the replacement of the hydroxyl group by alkoxy or aryloxy groups. This reversible reaction is commonly driven to product by the use of Dean-Stark apparatus or a dehydration agent to remove water.

PhB(OH)_{2} + 2 ROH ⇌ PhB(OR)_{2} + 2 H_{2}O

As an extension of this reactivity, PhB(OH)_{2} can be used as a protecting group for diols and diamines. This reactivity is the basis of the use of phenylboronic acid's use as a receptor and sensor for carbohydrates, antimicrobial agents, and enzyme inhibitors, neutron capture therapy for cancer, transmembrane transport, and bioconjugation and labeling of proteins and cell surface.

== See also ==
- 4-Nonylphenylboronic acid
