= Chan–Lam coupling =

Type of chemical reaction

Chan-Lam coupling
Named after	Dominic Chan; Patrick Lam
Reaction type	Coupling reaction

Identifiers
Organic Chemistry Portal	chan-lam-coupling
RSC ontology ID	RXNO:0000374

The Chan–Lam coupling reaction, also known as the Chan–Evans–Lam coupling, is a cross-coupling reaction between an aryl boronic acid and an alcohol or an amine to form the corresponding secondary aryl amines or aryl ethers, respectively. The Chan–Lam coupling is catalyzed by copper complexes. It can be conducted open to air at room temperature. The more popular Buchwald–Hartwig coupling relies on the use of palladium.

== History ==
Dominic Chan, David Evans, and Patrick Lam published their work nearly simultaneously. The mechanism however remained uncertain for many years. Later developments by others extended the scope to include using carboxylic acids, giving aryl-ester products.

== Mechanism ==
Analysis of the mechanism is complicated by the lability of copper reagents and the multicomponent nature of the reaction. The reaction proceeds via the formation of copper-aryl complexes. A copper(III)-aryl-alkoxide or copper(III)-aryl-amide intermediate undergoes Reductive elimination to give the aryl ether or aryl amine, respectively:

Ar-Cu(III)-NHR-L_{2} → Ar-NHR + Cu(I)L_{2}
Ar-Cu(III)-OR-L_{2} → Ar-OR + Cu(I)L_{2}

== Example ==
An example of the Chan–Lam coupling to synthesize biologically active compounds is shown below:

Reaction example of Chan–Lam coupling

Compound 1, a pyrrole, is coupled with aryl boronic acid, 2, to afford product 3, which is then carried forward to the target 4. The nitrile group of 2 does not poison the catalyst. Pyridine is the ligand used for the reaction. Although the reaction requires three days, it was carried out at room temperature in ambient air and resulted in a 93% yield.
