= Trimethyl borate =

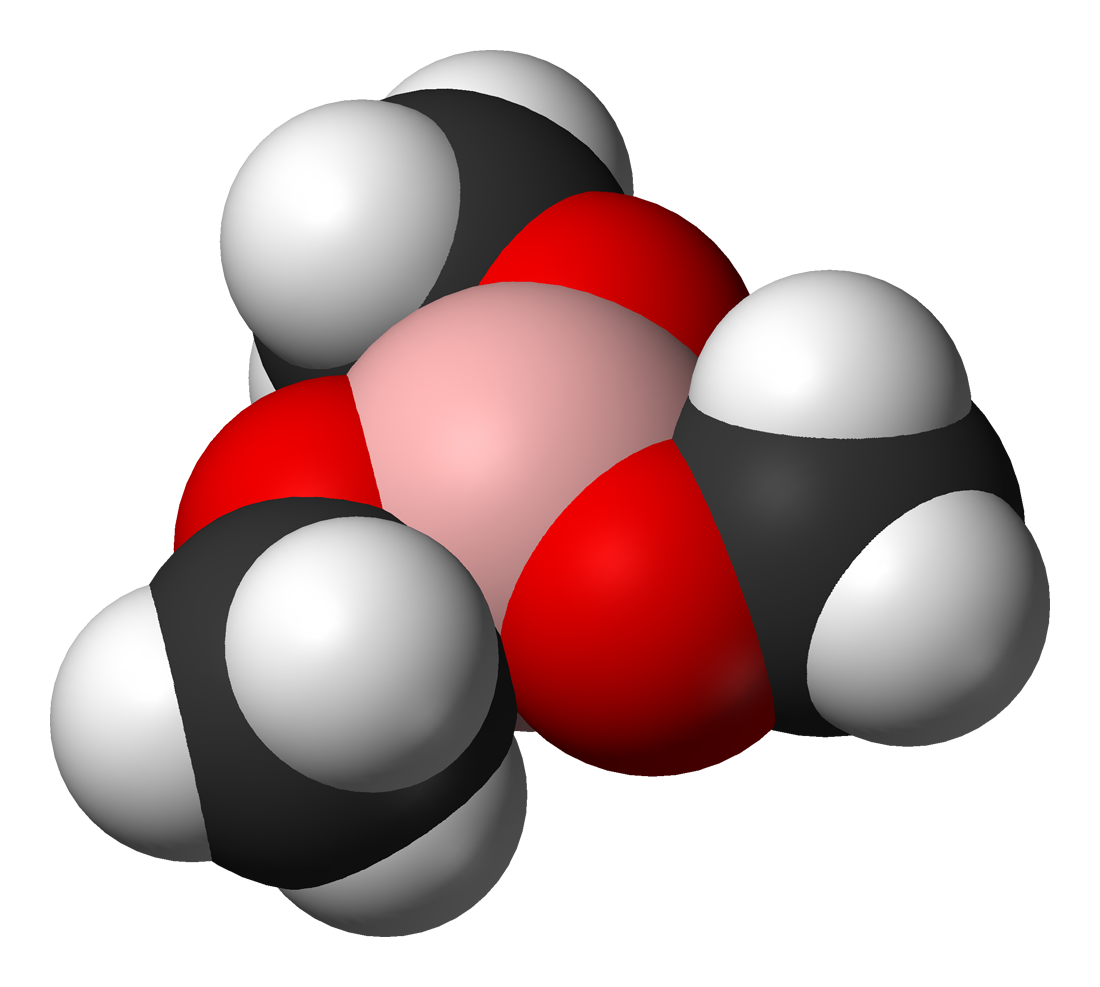

Names
- IUPAC name Trimethyl borate
- Other names Trimethoxyborane

Identifiers
CAS Number	121-43-7
3D model (JSmol)	Interactive image
ChEBI	CHEBI:38913
ChemSpider	8157
ECHA InfoCard	100.004.063
EC Number	204-468-9
PubChem CID	8470
UNII	82U64J6F5N
CompTox Dashboard (EPA)	DTXSID0037738
- InChI: InChI=1S/C3H9BO3/c1-5-4(6-2)7-3/h1-3H3 Key: WRECIMRULFAWHA-UHFFFAOYSA-N; InChI=1/C3H9BO3/c1-5-4(6-2)7-3/h1-3H3 Key: WRECIMRULFAWHA-UHFFFAOYAY
- SMILES: O(B(OC)OC)C

Properties
Chemical formula	C_{3}H_{9}BO_{3}
Molar mass	103.91 g·mol^{−1}
Appearance	colourless liquid
Density	0.932 g/ml
Melting point	−34 °C (−29 °F; 239 K)
Boiling point	68 to 69 °C (154 to 156 °F; 341 to 342 K)
Solubility in water	decomposition

Hazards
- Occupational safety and health (OHS/OSH)
Main hazards	flammable

Related compounds
Other cations	Trimethyl phosphite Tetramethyl orthosilicate
- Except where otherwise noted, data are given for materials in their standard state (at 25 °C [77 °F], 100 kPa). verify (what is ?) Infobox references

Trimethyl borate is the organoboron compound with the formula B(OCH_{3})_{3}. It is a colourless liquid that burns with a green flame. It is an intermediate in the preparation of sodium borohydride and is a popular reagent in organic chemistry. It is a weak Lewis acid (AN = 23, Gutmann-Beckett method).

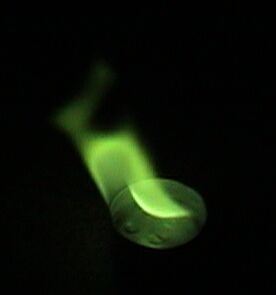
This chemical is quite flammable and burns with a green flame

Borate esters are prepared by heating boric acid or related boron oxides with alcohols under conditions where water is removed by azeotropic distillation.

== Applications ==
Trimethyl borate is the main precursor to sodium borohydride by its reaction with sodium hydride in the Brown-Schlesinger process:

4 NaH + B(OCH_{3})_{3} → NaBH_{4} + 3 NaOCH_{3}

It is a gaseous anti-oxidant in brazing and solder flux. Otherwise, trimethyl borate has no announced commercial applications. It has been explored as a fire retardant, as well as being examined as an additive to some polymers.

=== Organic synthesis ===
It is a useful reagent in organic synthesis, as a precursor to boronic acids, which are used in Suzuki couplings. These boronic acids are prepared via reaction of the trimethyl borate with Grignard reagents followed by hydrolysis:.

ArMgBr + B(OCH_{3})_{3} → MgBrOCH_{3} + ArB(OCH_{3})_{2}
ArB(OCH_{3})_{2} + 2 H_{2}O → ArB(OH)_{2} + 2 HOCH_{3}
