= Gutmann–Beckett method =

Technique for measuring a molecule's Lewis acidity

In chemistry, the Gutmann–Beckett method is an experimental procedure used by chemists to assess the Lewis acidity of molecular species. Triethylphosphine oxide (Et_{3}PO, TEPO) is used as a probe molecule and systems are evaluated by ^{31}P-NMR spectroscopy. In 1975, Viktor Gutmann used ^{31}P-NMR spectroscopy to parameterize Lewis acidity of solvents by acceptor numbers (AN). In 1996, Michael A. Beckett recognised its more generally utility and adapted the procedure so that it could be easily applied to molecular species, when dissolved in weakly Lewis acidic solvents. The term Gutmann–Beckett method was first used in chemical literature in 2007.

== Background ==
The ^{31}P chemical shift (δ) of Et_{3}PO is sensitive to chemical environment but can usually be found between +40 and +100 ppm. The O atom in Et_{3}PO is a Lewis base, and its interaction with Lewis acid sites causes deshielding of the adjacent P atom. Gutmann, a chemist renowned for his work on non-aqueous solvents, described an acceptor-number scale for solvent Lewis acidity with two reference points relating to the ^{31}P NMR chemical shift of Et_{3}PO in the weakly Lewis acidic solvent hexane (δ = 41.0 ppm, AN 0) and in the strongly Lewis acidic solvent SbCl_{5} (δ = 86.1 ppm, AN 100). Acceptor numbers can be calculated from AN = 2.21 × (δ_{sample} − 41.0) and higher AN values indicate greater Lewis acidity. It is generally known that there is no one universal order of Lewis acid strengths (or Lewis base strengths) and that two parameters (or two properties) are needed (see HSAB theory and ECW model) to define acid and base strengths and that single parameter or property scales are limited to a smaller range of acids (or bases). The Gutmann–Beckett method is based on a single parameter NMR chemical shift scale but is in commonly used due to its experimental convenience.

== Application to boranes ==
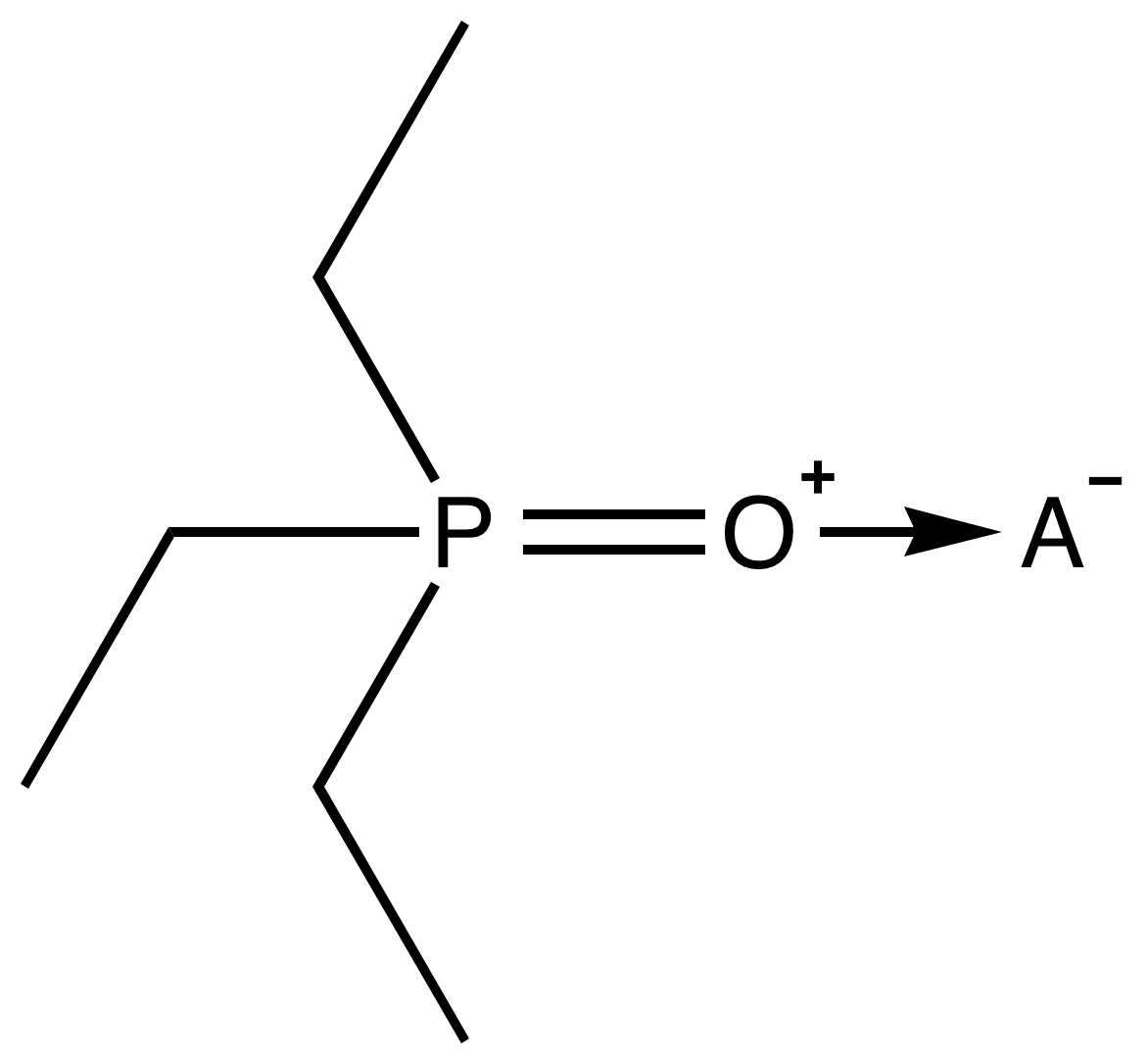
Interaction of triethylphosphine oxide with a Lewis acid

Boron trihalides are archetypal Lewis acids and have AN values between 89 (BF_{3}) and 115 (BI_{3}). The Gutmann–Beckett method has been applied to fluoroarylboranes such as B(C_{6}F_{5})_{3} (AN 82), and borenium cations, and its application to these and various other boron compounds has been reviewed.

== Application to other compounds ==
The Gutmann–Beckett method has been successfully applied to alkaline earth metal complexes, p-block main group compounds (e.g. AlCl_{3}, AN 87; silylium cations; [E(bipy)_{2}]^{3+} (E = P, As, Sb, Bi) cations; cationic 4 coordinate P^{v} and Sb^{v} derivatives) and transition-metal compounds (e.g. TiCl_{4}, AN 70).
