= Protonolysis =

Cleavage of a chemical bond by acids

Protonolysis is the cleavage of a chemical bond by acids. Many examples are found in organometallic chemistry since the reaction requires polar M^{δ+}-R^{δ-} bonds, where δ+ and δ- signify partial positive and negative charges associated with the bonding atoms. When compounds containing these bonds are treated with acid (HX), these bonds cleave:

M-R + HX → M-X + H-R

Hydrolysis (X^{−} = OH^{−}) is a special case of protonolysis. Compounds susceptible to hydrolysis often undergo protonolysis.

== Hydrides ==
The borohydride anion is susceptible to reaction with even weak acids, resulting protonolysis of one or more B-H bonds. Protonolysis of sodium borohydride with acetic acid gives triacetoxyborohydride:

NaBH_{4} + 3 HO_{2}CCH_{3} → NaBH(O_{2}CCH_{3})_{3} + 3 H_{2}

Related reactions occur for hydrides of other electropositive elements, e.g. lithium aluminium hydride.

== Alkyls ==
The alkyl derivatives of many metals undergo protonolysis. For the alkyls of very electropositive metals (zinc, magnesium, and lithium), water is sufficiently acidic, in which case the reaction is called hydrolysis. Protonolysis with mineral acids is sometimes used to remove organic ligands from a metal center.

== Nitrides, phosphides, silicides and related species ==
Inorganic materials with highly charged anions are often susceptible to protonolysis. Derivatives of nitride (N^{3−}), phosphides (P^{3−}), and silicides (Si^{4−}) hydrolyze to give ammonia, phosphine, and silane. Analogous reactions occur with molecular compounds with M-NR_{2}, M-PR_{2}, and M-SiR_{3} bonds.
