= Borylene =

Typical borylene

A borylene is the boron analogue of a carbene. The general structure is R-B: with R an organic moiety and B a boron atom with two unshared electrons. Borylenes are of academic interest in organoboron chemistry. A singlet ground state is predominant with boron having two vacant sp^{2} orbitals and one doubly occupied one. With just one additional substituent the boron is more electron deficient than the carbon atom in a carbene. For this reason stable borylenes are more uncommon than stable carbenes. Some borylenes such as boron monofluoride (BF) and boron monohydride (BH) the parent compound also known simply as borylene, have been detected in microwave spectroscopy and may exist in stars. Other borylenes exist as reactive intermediates and can only be inferred by chemical trapping.

The first stable terminal borylene complex [(OC)_{5}WBN(SiMe_{3})_{2}] was reported by Holger Braunschweig et al. in 1998. In this compound a borylene is coordinated to a transition metal. Borylenes are also stabilized as Lewis base adducts, e.g. with a NHC carbene. Other strategies are the use of cyclic alkyl amino carbenes (CAACs) and other Lewis bases, and their use as bis-adducts.

== Free borylenes ==
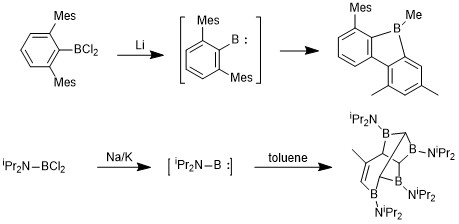
Above: Upon reduction of the arylboron dichloride, a borylene is liberated. This intermediate adds into a C-C bond in the mesityl group. Below: Reduction of an dichloroaminoborane with Na/K yields a transient aminoborylene. Four equivalents of this species attack toluene to give a particularly complex product.

As discussed above, free borylenes have yet to be isolated, but they have been the subject of a number of computational studies and have investigated spectroscopically and experimentally. B-R (R=H, F, Cl, Br, I, NH_{2}, C_{2}H, Ph) have been observed via microwave or IR spectroscopy at low temperature via elaborate procedures. When generated as reactive intermediates, borylenes have been shown to activate strong C-C single bonds, yielding products analogous to an organometallic oxidative addition reaction. Most commonly, these are generated via reduction of an organoborane dichloride, but photolysis of other boranes can also afford short-lived borylene species.

As might be expected, calculations have demonstrated that the HOMO is composed of the nonbonding electrons on boron (nσ-type, sp character). The LUMO and LUMO+1 are empty, orthogonal pπ-type orbitals and are degenerate in energy except in the case where R breaks the symmetry of the molecule, thus lifting the degeneracy. Unlike carbenes, which can exist in either singlet or triplet ground states, calculations have indicated that all yet-studied borylenes have a singlet ground spin state. The smallest singlet-triplet gap was calculated to be 8.2 kcal/mol for Me3Si-B. Aminoborylene (H_{2}NB) is a slight exception to the above paradigm, as the nitrogen lone pair donates into an unoccupied boron p orbital. Thus, there is formally a double bond between boron and nitrogen; the π* combination of this interaction serves as the LUMO+1.

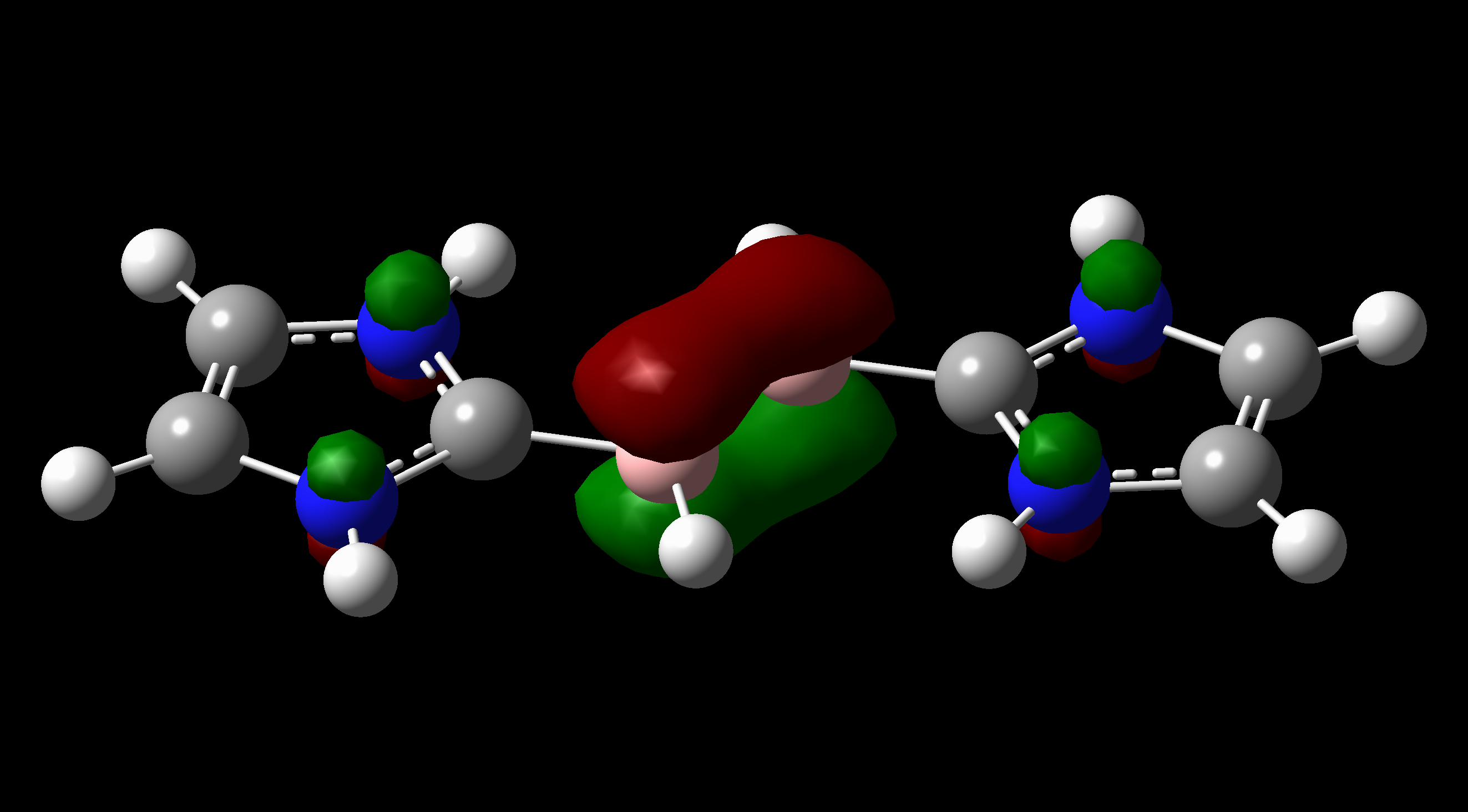
Diborene B-B π-bonding HOMO.

== Mono-Lewis base-stabilized borylenes ==
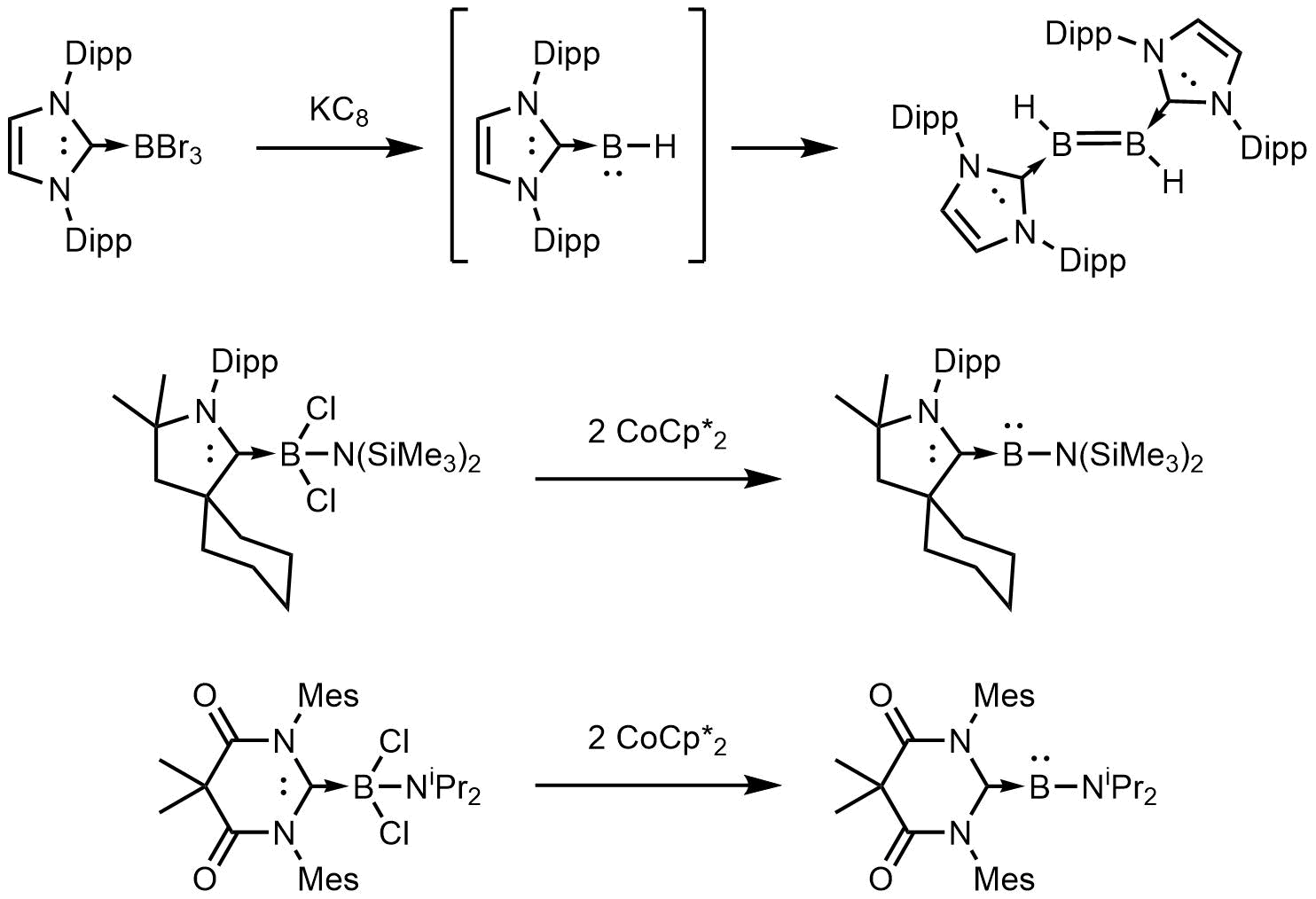
Above: Diborene dimer generated via reduction of an (NHC)borane adduct. Middle and bottom: two examples of mono-Lewis base-stabilized borylenes using CAAC and DAC ligands.

The first example of a borylene stabilized by a single Lewis base was reported in 2007 and exists as a dimer—a diborene. An (NHC)BBr_{3} adduct was reduced to generate a probable (NHC)B-H intermediate that subsequently dimerized to form the diborene. A similar species with a boron–boron single bond was also observed. The diborene has an incredibly short boron–boron bond length of 1.560(18) Å, further supporting the assignment of a double bond. DFT and NBO calculations were performed on a model system (with Dipp moieties replaced by H). Although some differences between the calculated and crystal structures were evident, they could primarily be ascribed to distortions from planarity caused by the bulky Dipp groups. The HOMO was calculated to be a B-B π-bonding orbital and the HOMO-1 is of mixed B-H and B-B σ-bonding character. NBO calculations supported the above assessments, as populations for the B-B σ- and π-bonding orbitals were calculated to be 1.943 and 1.382 respectively.

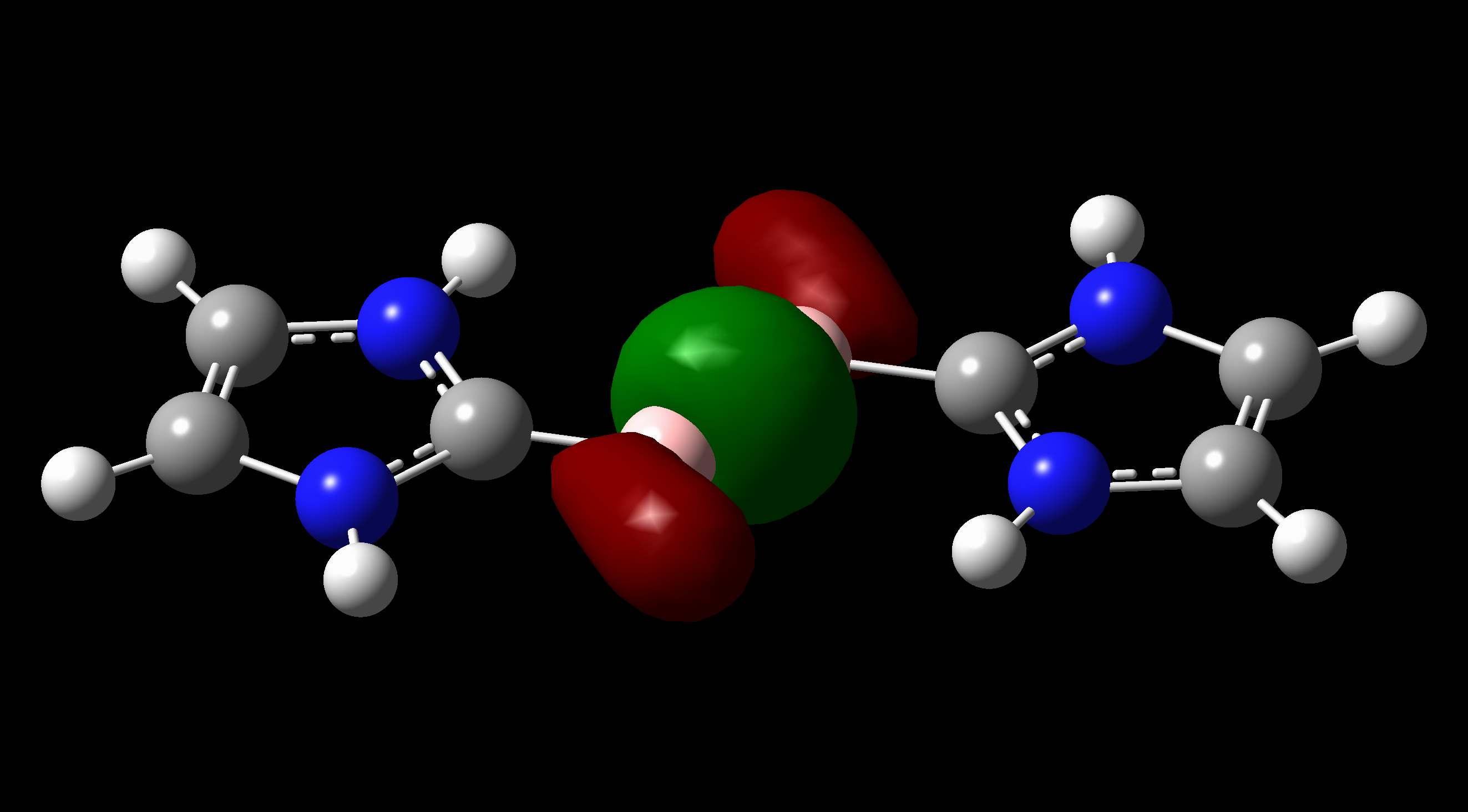
Diborene B-B σ-bonding HOMO-1.

A number of similar compounds have been generated and isolated, and several studies involving putative mono-Lewis base-stabilized borylene intermediates have been reported. However, an isolable example remained elusive until 2014. Betrand et al. argued that due to boron's electropositivity and thus preference to be electron-poor, CAAC (cyclic (alkyl)(amino)carbene) might serve as a better Lewis base than the more commonplace NHC. The (NHC)borane adduct was prepared then reduced with Co(Cp*)_{2}. One equivalent of reductant yielded an aminoboryl radical and a second reduction event lead to the desired (CAAC)borylene. Another group followed a similar synthetic strategy using DAC(diamidocarbene); the reduction of a (DAC)borane derivative afforded an analogous (DAC)borylene (see figure). Although the C=B=NR_{2} structure is similar in nature to aminoboraalkenes, an exploration of molecular orbitals gives an entirely different picture: as expected, the HOMO is a bond of π symmetry derived from the donation of boron's lone pair into the empty orbital on carbon. As previously discussed, a nitrogen lone pair donates into an empty boron p-orbital to form a π bond; the out of phase combination serves as a high-energy LUMO+2.

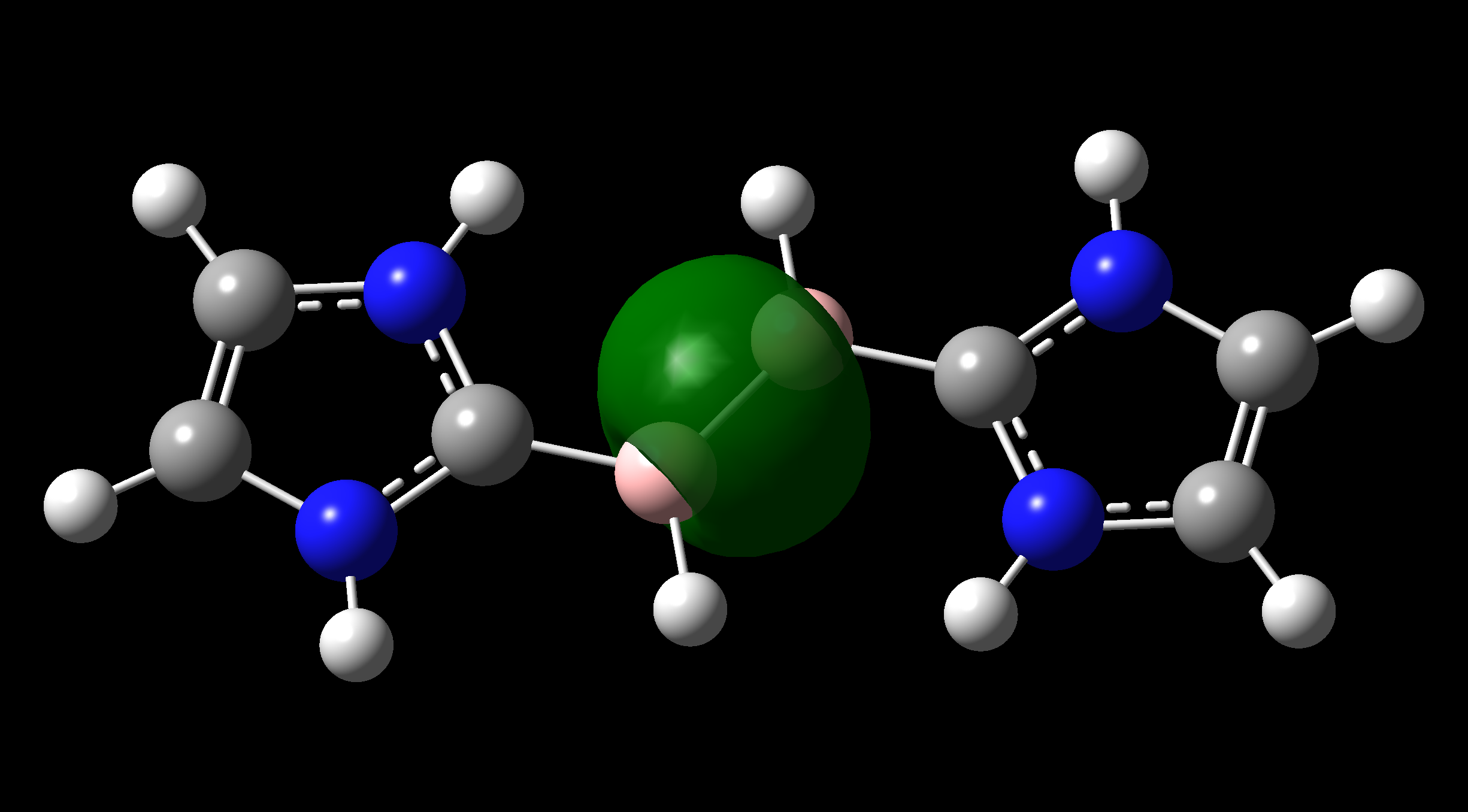
Diborene B-B σ-bonding-derived NBO.

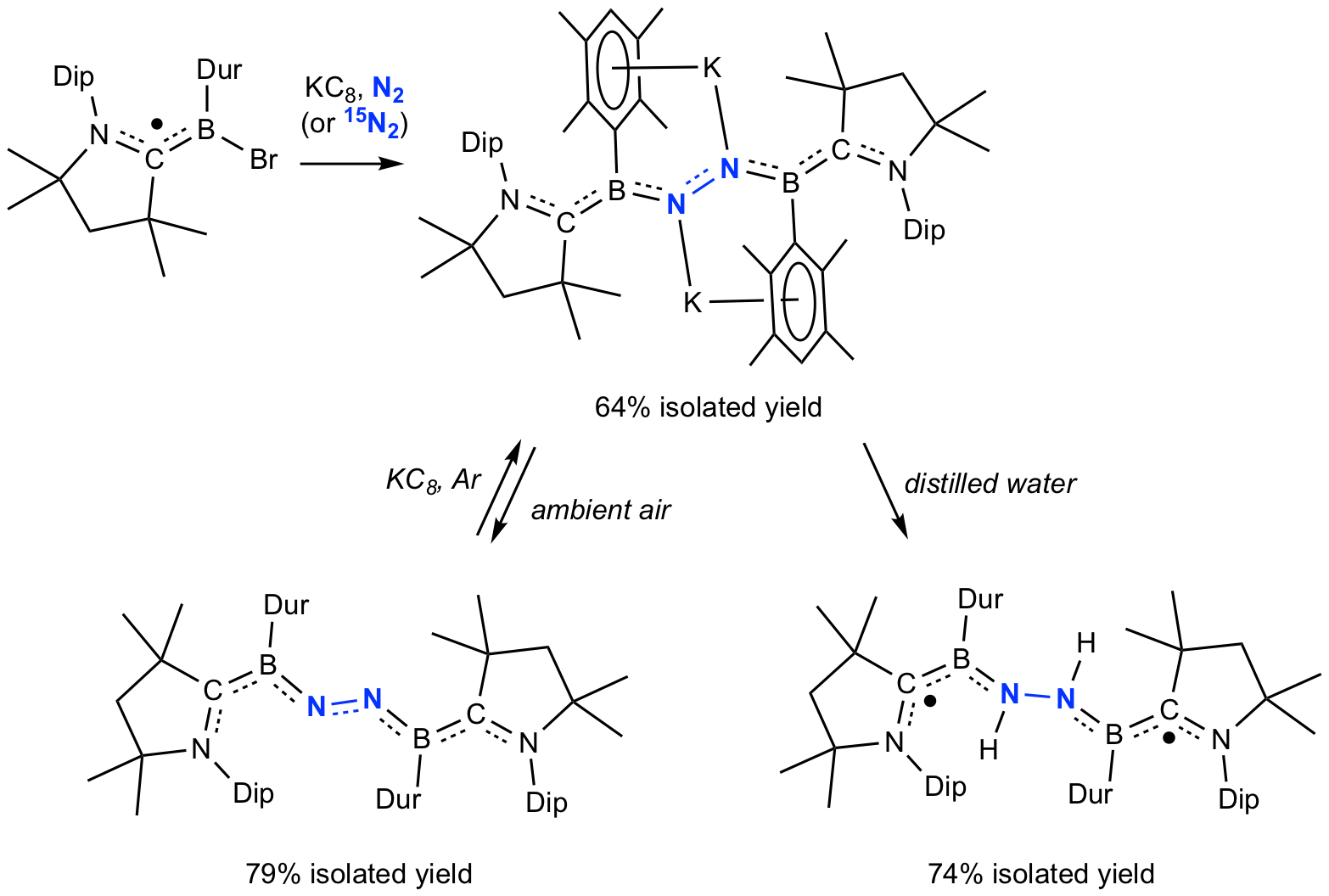
Braunschweig's 2018 dinitrogen activation with a transient borylene species

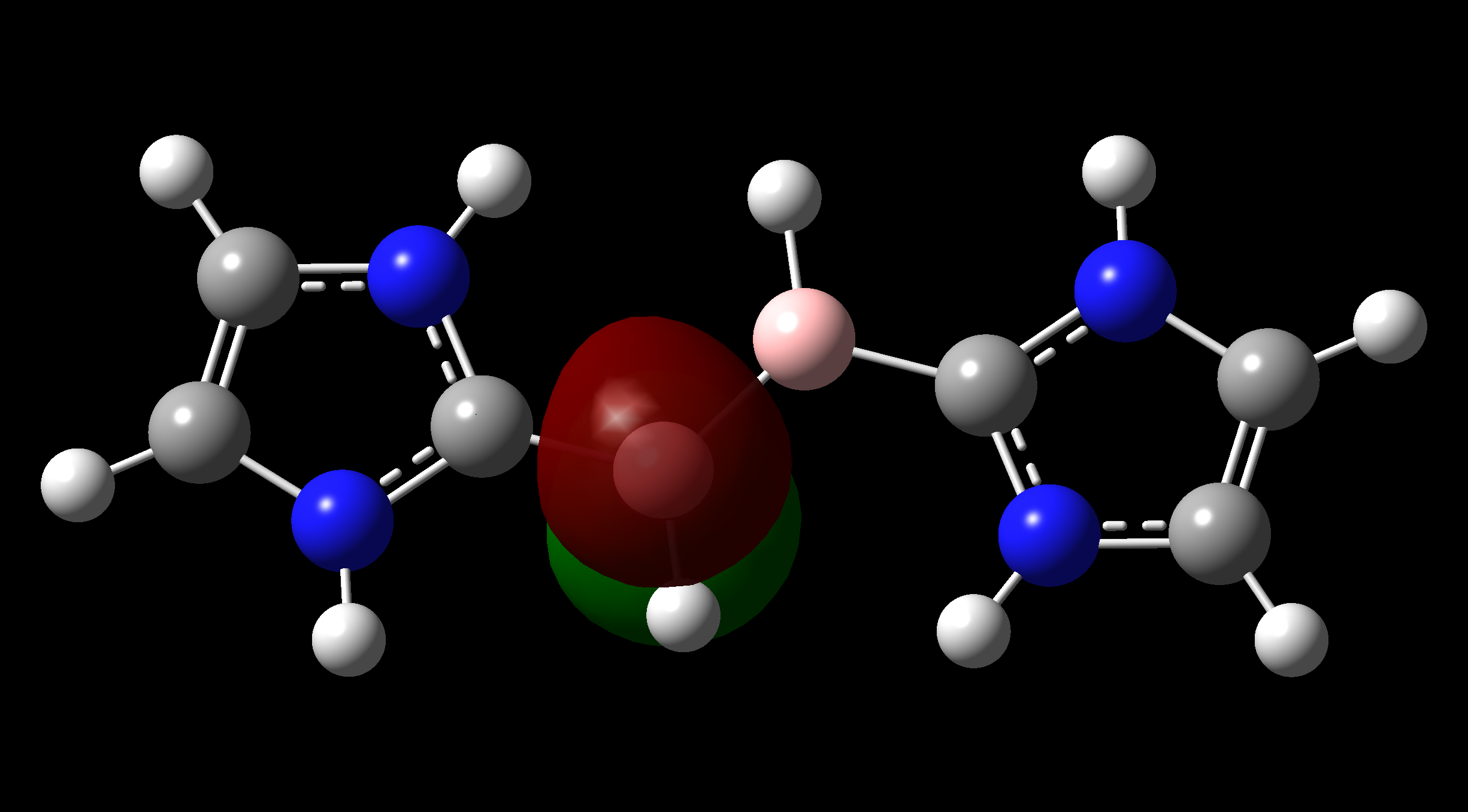
Diborene B lone pair-derived NBO.

The first example of dinitrogen fixation at a p-block element was published in 2018 by Holger Braunschweig et al., whereby one molecule of dinitrogen is bound by two transient mono-Lewis base-stabilized borylene species. The resulting dianion was subsequently oxidized to a neutral compound, and reduced using water.

== Bis-Lewis base-stabilized borylenes ==
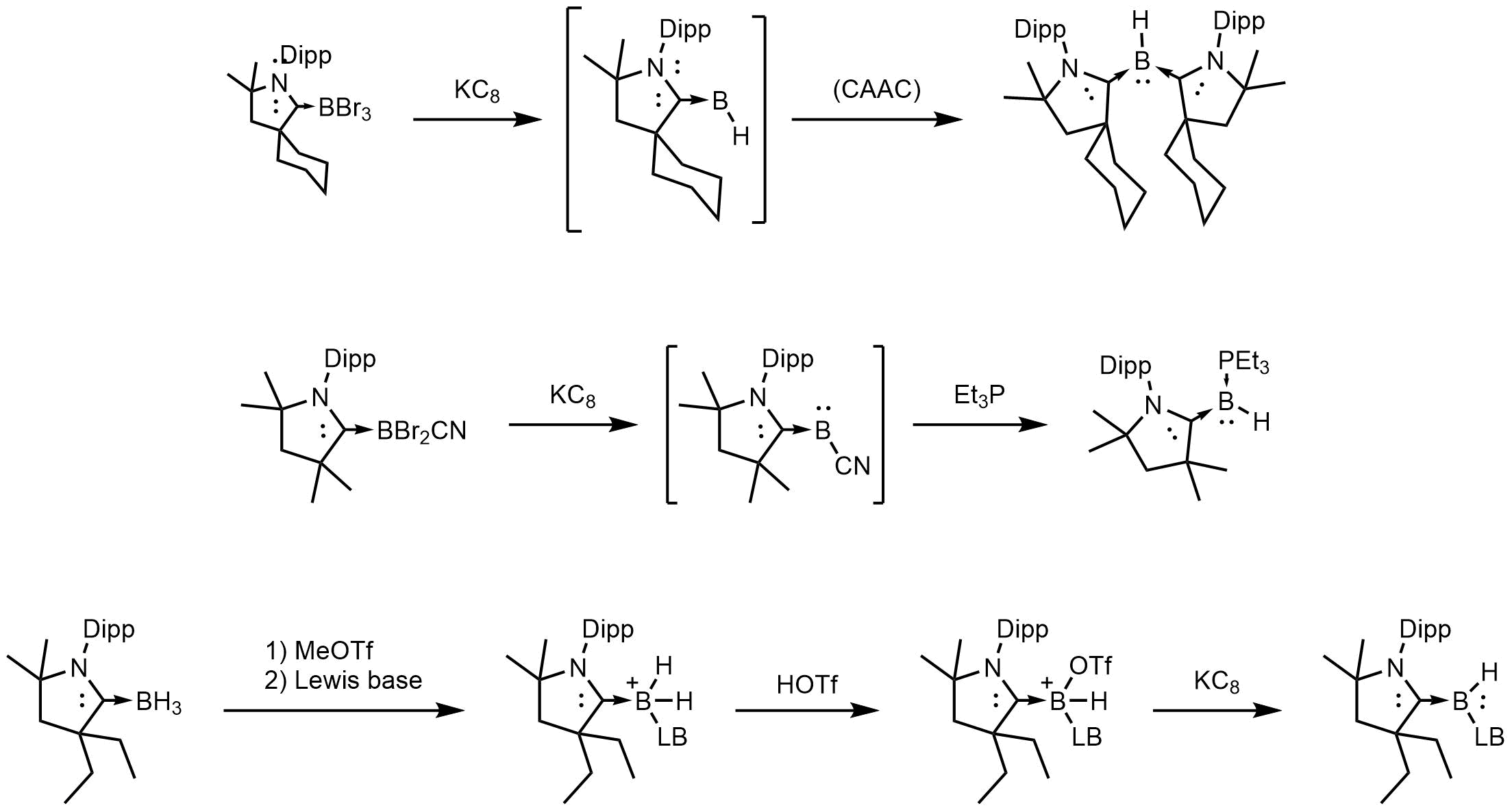
DiLewisBaseBorylene

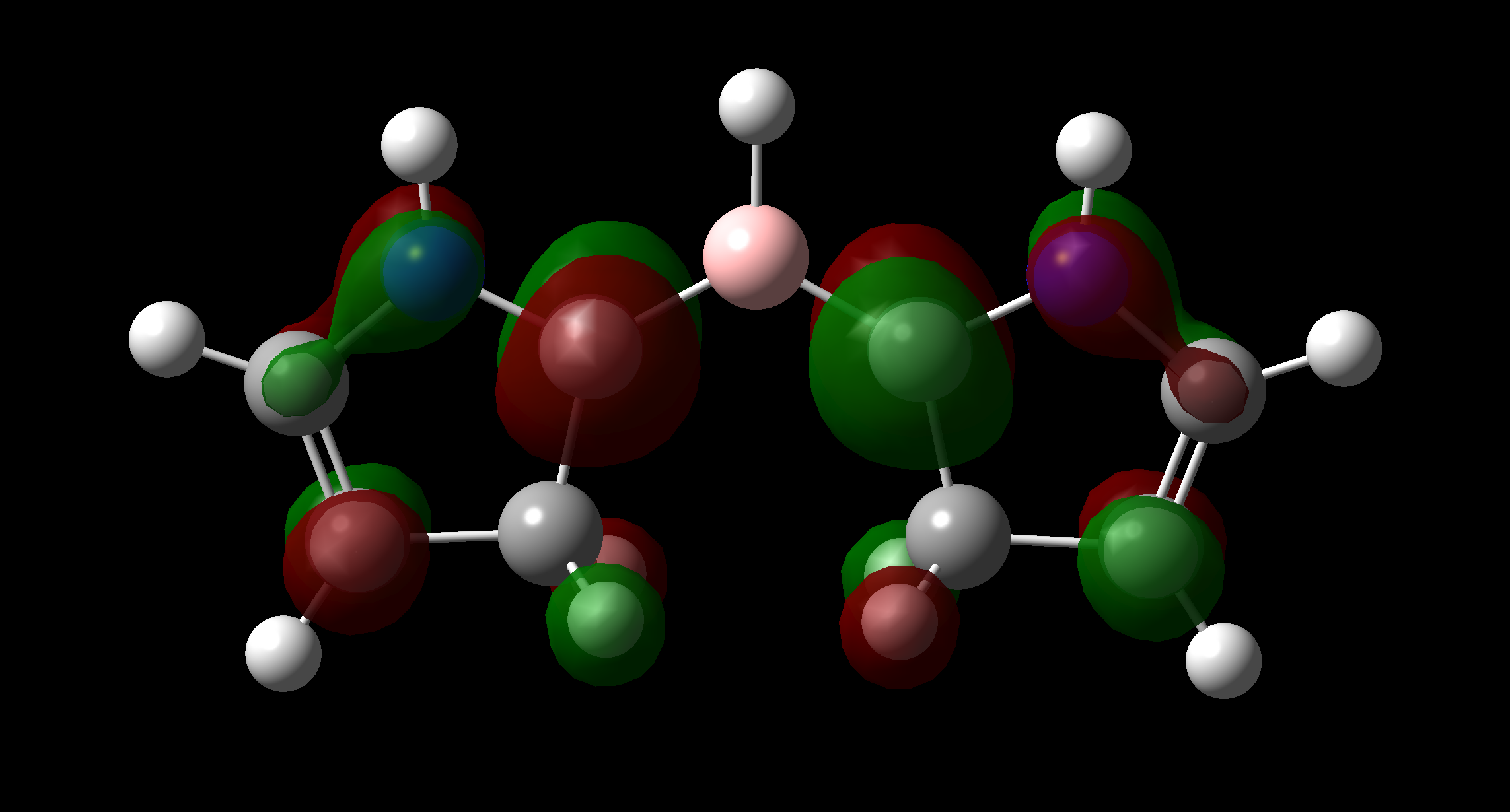
Bis(CAAC)BH LUMO.

Taking inspiration from Robinson's above diborene synthesis, Bertrand et al. swapped NHC for CAAC and successfully isolated the first bis-Lewis base-stabilized borylene in 2011. Reduction of (CAAC)BBr_{3} with KC_{8} in the presence of excess CAAC afforded the bis(CAAC)BH. A labeling study indicated that the H-atom was abstracted from an aryl group associated with the CAAC. Reduction of (CAAC)BBr_{3} yields the same terminal borylene even in the absence of additional Lewis base via a mechanism that remains poorly understood. Exploitation of this procedure has been used to form mixed bis-Lewis base-stabilized borylenes as well. Several other routes have also been proposed. A more novel one employs methyl triflate to abstract a hydride from (CAAC)BH_{3}. Treatment with a Lewis base, followed by triflic acid and KC_{8} afford the desired (CAAC)(Lewis base)BH. Although the reported case uses only specific Lewis bases, the approach is argued to be highly generalizable. A number of other compounds in this class have been generated using borylene-transition metal complexes as precursors. Treatment of (OC)_{5}M=B-Tp with carbon monoxide or acetonitrile yields the corresponding adducts: (CO)_{2}B-Tp and (MeNC)_{2}B-Tp.

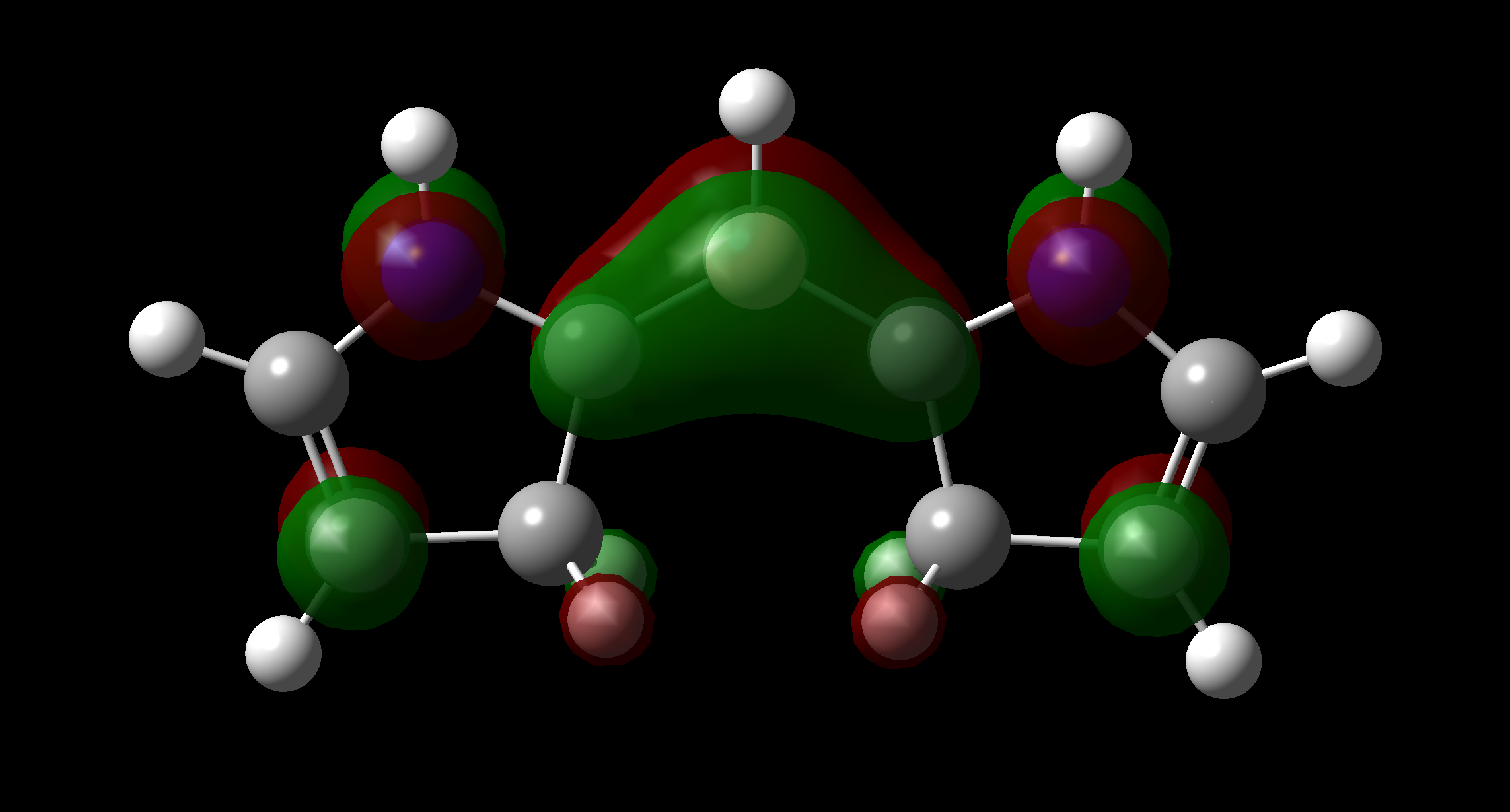
Bis(CAAC)BH HOMO.

Bonding in these complexes is quite similar to that in mono-Lewis base compounds. At least one π-acceptor ligand is present in all known examples of these compounds, and the B-L bond strength tends to scale with the π-acidity of the Lewis base. Low-energy σ-donation orbitals from the base to boron are present in these compounds, and the π-interaction from boron's lone pair to the Lewis base serves as the HOMO. Calculated electronic structure for a number of borylene complexes were compared with their isoelectronic homologues: carbone complexes (CL_{2}) and nitrogen cation complexes ((N^{+})L_{2}).

== Borylene-transition metal complexes ==
The first transition metal complex reported by Braunschweig et al. featured a borylene ligand bridging between two manganese centers: [ μ-BX{η^{5}-C_{5}H_{4}R}Mn(CO)_{2}}_{2}] (R=H, Me; X=NMe_{2}). The first terminal borylene complex [(CO)_{5}MBN(SiMe_{3})_{2}] was prepared by the same group several years later. Two previous structures – [(CO)_{4}Fe(BNMe_{2})] and [(CO)_{4}Fe{BN(SiMe_{3})_{2}}] – had been proposed by other groups but disqualified due to inconsistent ^{11}B-NMR data. A number of diborylene complexes have also been described. The first of these, [(η^{5}-C_{5}Me_{5})Ir{BN(SiMe_{3})_{2}}_{2}], was prepared by the photochemical reaction of [(η^{5}-C_{5}Me_{5})Ir(CO)_{2}] with [(OC)5Cr{BN(SiMe_{3})_{2}}]. One unusual reaction exhibited by these complexes is coupling of borylene and carbon monoxide ligands. Catenation of an iron borylene complex has generate an iron complex of a tetraboron (B_{4}) chain.

Orbitally, the interactions between transition metals and borylenes tend to be similar to the above Lewis acids and borylenes. A number of computational studies have been performed on these systems. A sample paper from 2000 employed NBO to analyze a series of related complexes. Taking [(CO)_{4}Fe{BN(SiH_{3})_{2}}] as an example, it was calculated that—as expected—the boron moiety is relatively electron-poor (+0.59 charge). The Fe-B π-bonding orbitals were found to have populations of 0.39 and 0.48 whereas the σ-bonding had 0.61. Thus, the Wiberg bond index of the Fe-B bond was a relatively strong 0.65 (compare: Fe-CO was 0.62 in the same complex. The analogous tungsten complex had a bond index value of 0.82. Overall, the paper concludes that transition metal-borylene bonds are very strong. However, the bonding has strong ionic contributions. Orbital attractions are primarily σ- accompanied by weaker π-interactions. Unlike corresponding metal-carbyne complexes, the bond order in all studied cases was less than 1.
