= Holger Braunschweig =

German chemist (born 1961)

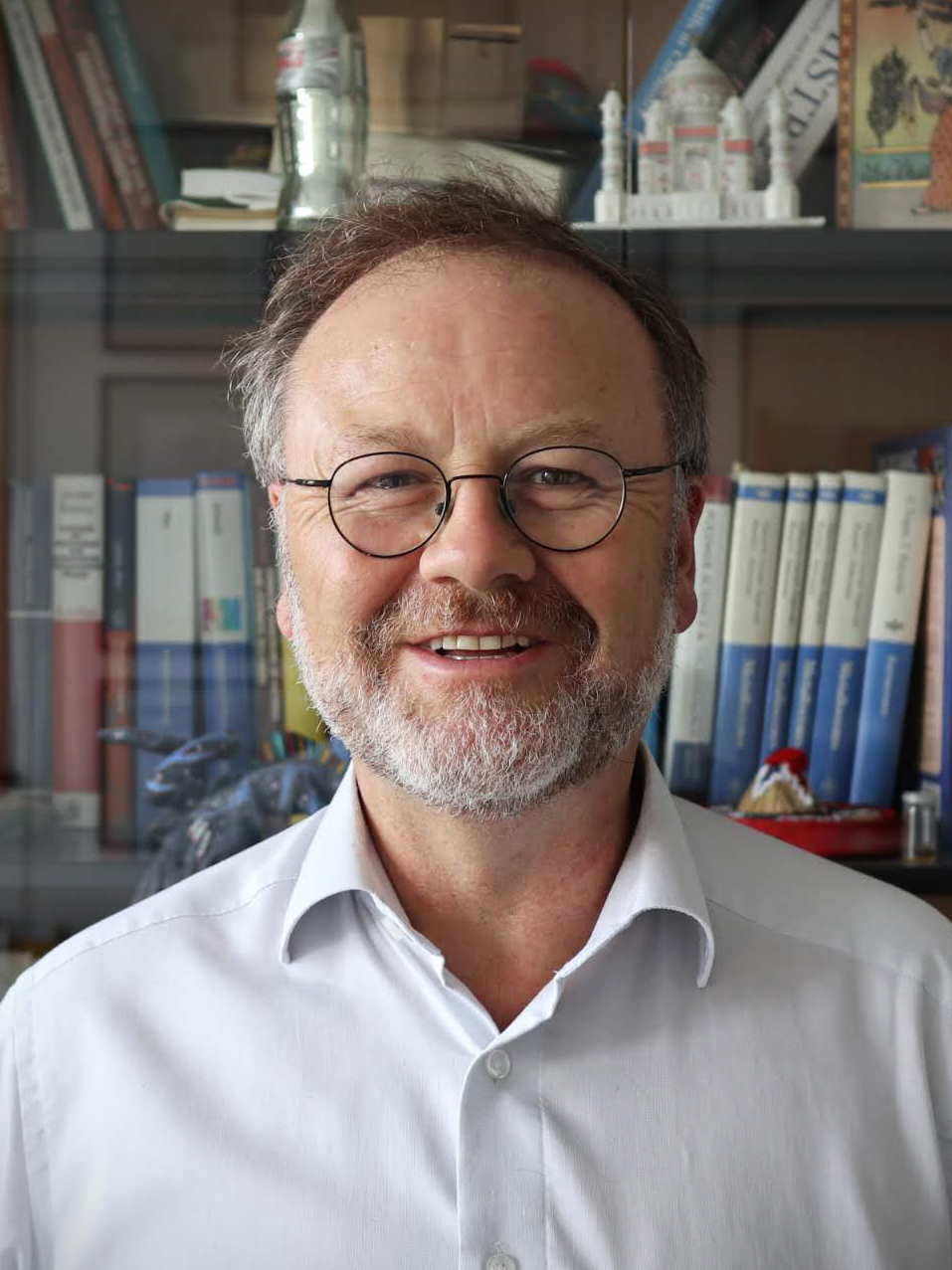
- Born: 1961 (age 64–65); Germany
- Education: RWTH Aachen University
- Known for: Organoboron chemistry, Borylene Chemistry, Diborynes, Diborenes
- Awards: 2009 DFG Gottfried Wilhelm Leibniz Prize, 2014 RSC Main Group Award, 2016 GDCh Alfred Stock Memorial Prize, 2021 RSC Mond-Nyholm Prize, 2024 ACS M. Frederick Hawthorne Award, 2024 ENI award for Advanced Environmental Solutions
- Scientific career
- Fields: Chemistry, Inorganic Chemistry, Organometallic Chemistry, Main-Group Chemistry, Organoboron chemistry
- Workplaces: University of Würzburg
- Website: www.braunschweiggroup.de

Holger Braunschweig FRSC is Head and Chair of Inorganic Chemistry at the Julius-Maximilians-University of Würzburg in Würzburg, Germany. He is best known for founding the field of transition metal-boron multiple bonding (transition metal borylenes), the synthesis of the first stable compounds containing boron-boron and boron-oxygen triple bonds, the isolation of the first non-carbon/nitrogen main-group dicarbonyl, and the first fixation of dinitrogen at an element of the p-block of the periodic table. By modifying a strategy pioneered by Prof. Gregory Robinson of the University of Georgia, Braunschweig also discovered the first rational and high-yield synthesis of neutral compounds containing boron-boron double bonds (diborenes). In 2016 Braunschweig isolated the first compounds of beryllium in the oxidation state of zero.

== Education and research career ==
Braunschweig obtained his Ph.D. and Habilitation from RWTH Aachen with P. Paetzold and worked as a postdoctoral researcher with Michael F. Lappert, FRS, at the University of Sussex, Brighton. After two years at Imperial College London as Senior Lecturer and Reader he took up a Chair of Inorganic Chemistry at the Julius-Maximilians-University of Würzburg in 2002, and is now also the founding director of the Institute for Sustainable Chemistry & Catalysis with Boron (ICB).

== Professional achievements ==
In 2009 Braunschweig was awarded the Gottfried Wilhelm Leibniz Prize of the German Research Foundation (DFG) – the highest German-based research prize. He was also awarded the 2014 RSC Main Group Award, the 2016 Alfred Stock Memorial Prize of the German Society of Chemists, the 2021 RSC Mond-Nyholm Prize, the 2024 ACS M. Frederick Hawthorne Award, and the 2024 Eni Advanced Environmental Solutions Prize. He is a Fellow of the Royal Society of Chemistry, a member of the German National Academy of Science (Leopoldina), the Bavarian Academy of Sciences and Humanities, and the North Rhine-Westphalian Academy of Sciences, Humanities and the Arts.

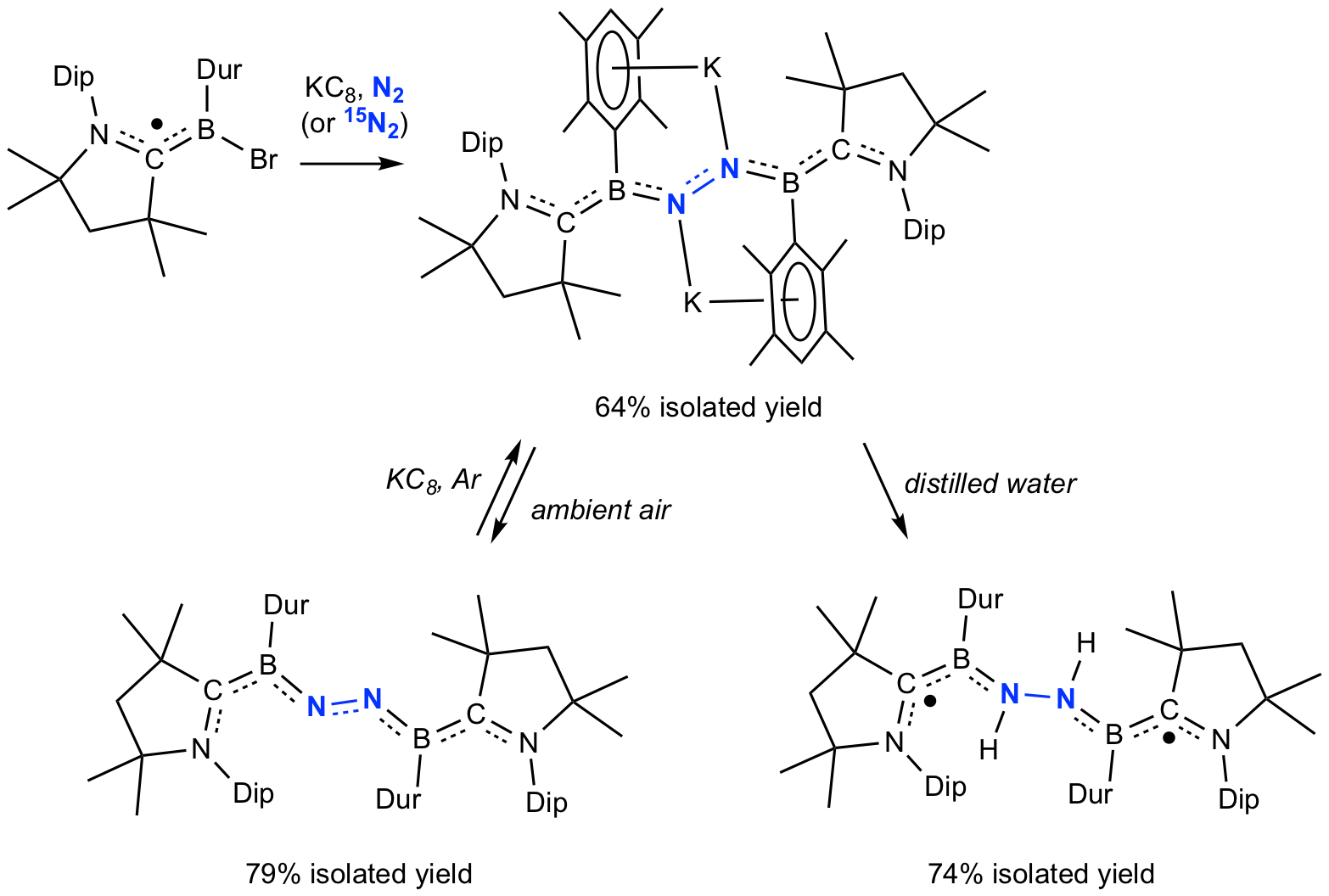
Braunschweig's 2018 dinitrogen activation with a transient borylene species
