= Stefanie Dehnen =

German inorganic chemist

Stefanie Dehnen (born 31 May 1969) is a German chemist. She is the executive director of the Institute of Nanotechnology at the Karlsruhe Institute of Technology. From 2006 to 2022, she was a full professor for inorganic chemistry at the University of Marburg. She has received numerous awards for her research in inorganic chemistry. In 2024 and 2025, she will be the president of the German Chemical Society.

== Education and professional life ==
Dehnen studied Chemistry at the University of Karlsruhe from 1988 to 1993. She finished her doctoral degree in Chemistry in the group of Dieter Fenske in 1996 and she completed her habilitation at the University of Karlsruhe in 2004. She was a full professor for inorganic chemistry at the University of Marburg from 2006 to 2022. Since October 2022, she is the executive director of the Institute of Nanotechnology at the Karlsruhe Institute of Technology. Since 2022, she is also Editor in Chief of the Journal Inorganic Chemistry (journal).

== Personal life ==
She is married and has 4 children.

== Research ==
Her research focuses on the synthesis, the formation mechanisms, the stability, the reactivity, and the physical properties of compounds and materials with binary and ternary chalcogenidometalate anions, organotetrel chalcogenide compounds, binary Zintl anions and ternary intermetalloid clusters.

Three of her most-cited publications are:

- Bron, Philipp; Johansson, Sebastian; Zick, Klaus; Schmedt auf der Günne, Jörn; Dehnen, Stefanie; Roling, Bernhard (23 October 2013). "Li 10 SnP 2 S 12 : An Affordable Lithium Superionic Conductor". Journal of the American Chemical Society. 135 (42): 15694–15697. doi:10.1021/ja407393y. ISSN 0002-7863. PMID 24079534.
- Dehnen, Stefanie; Melullis, Maike (May 2007). "A coordination chemistry approach towards ternary M/14/16 anions". Coordination Chemistry Reviews. 251 (9–10): 1259–1280. doi:10.1016/j.ccr.2006.11.003.
- Fuhr, Olaf; Dehnen, Stefanie; Fenske, Dieter (2013). "Chalcogenide clusters of copper and silver from silylated chalcogenide sources". Chem. Soc. Rev. 42 (4): 1871–1906. doi:10.1039/C2CS35252D. ISSN 0306-0012. PMID 22918377.

== Awards ==
She has been awarded the Wöhler Young Scientists Award of the Society of German Chemists in 2004 and the State of Baden-Württemberg Teaching Award in 2005. Since 2016, Dehnen is a full member of the Göttingen Academy of Sciences and Humanities and the Mainz Academy of Sciences and Literature. In 2018, she was awarded the Philipps-Universität Marburg Award for Support of Women in Science of the University of Marburg. As the third woman (after Margot Becke and Marianne Baudler), she was awarded the Alfred Stock Memorial Prize in 2020. Moreover, she will give the Margot Becke lecture in 2020. In 2020 Stefanie Dehnen was accepted as a member of the National Academy of Sciences Leopoldina in the Chemistry Section. In 2022, she received the Gottfried Wilhelm Leibniz Prize and an ERC Advanced Grant for research into bismuth clusters. Since 2022, she is also a member of the Berlin-Brandenburg Academy of Sciences and Humanities. In 2023, she won the RSC/GDCh Alexander Todd-Hans Krebs Lectureship in Chemical Sciences of the Royal Society of Chemistry. In 2024 and 2025, she will be the president of the German Chemical Society.
