= Peter Paetzold =

German chemist

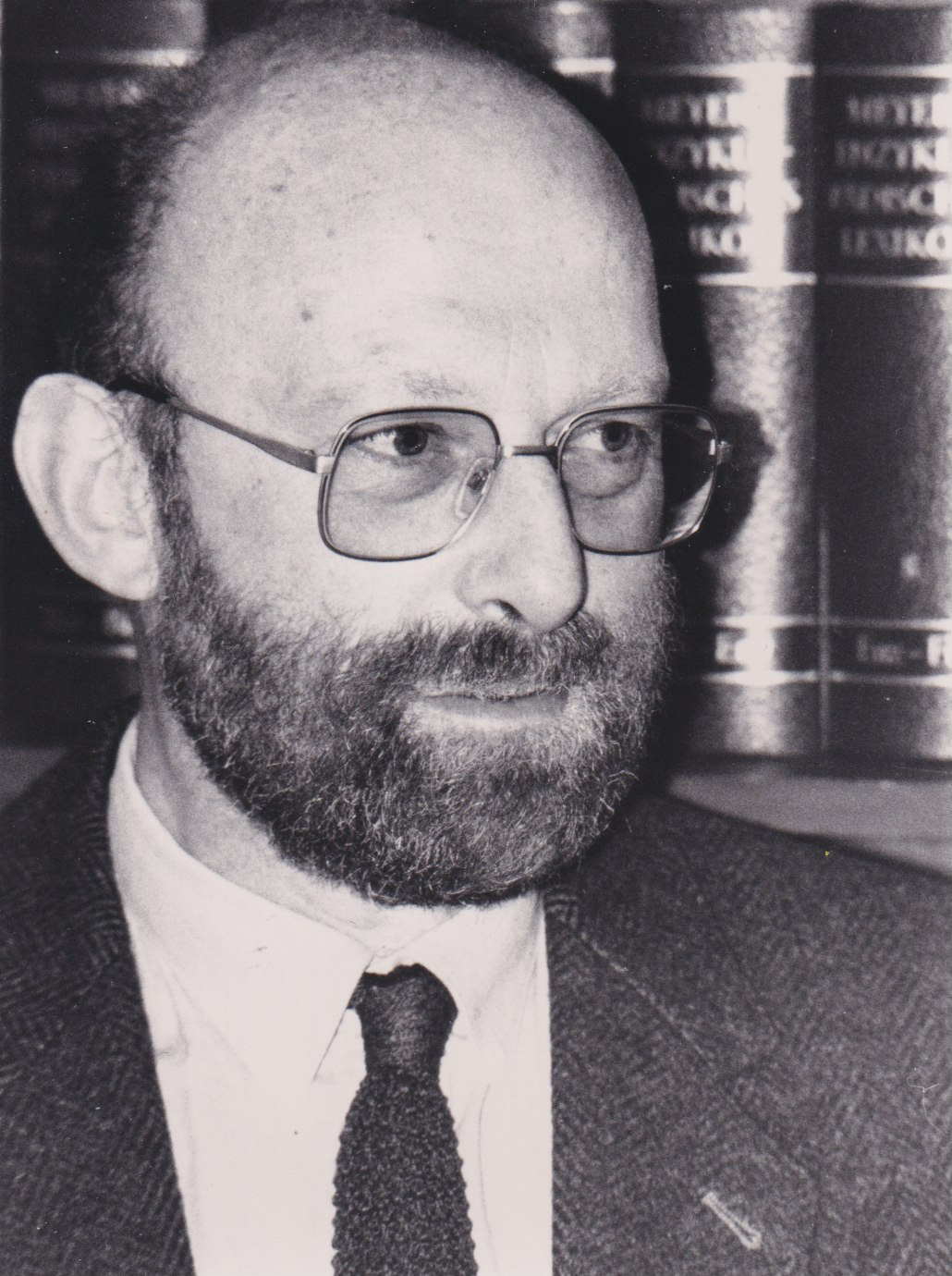
- Peter Paetzold (1985)
- Born: March 16, 1935; Plau, Mecklenburg, Germany
- Died: August 17, 2023 (aged 88); Aachen, Germany
- Occupation: chemist

Peter Paetzold (March 16, 1935 – August 17, 2023) was a German chemist and emeritus professor of inorganic chemistry at RWTH Aachen University.

== Life ==
He studied at LMU Munich. In 1961, he received his doctorate in the working group of Egon Wiberg; in his dissertation he dealt with the thermal decomposition of borazides. After his habilitation (1966), he taught for two more years at LMU Munich. He then moved to a chair of Inorganic Chemistry at RWTH Aachen University. In his research, he mainly dealt with the molecular chemistry of the element boron, especially with iminoboranes and cluster compounds. His list of publications includes about 180 papers. Paetzold retired in 2000. After various books and textbooks on chemistry, he published a textbook on general chemistry in autumn 2009. In 2015, a scientific colloquium in his honor took place. He was married and had 4 children.

== Awards ==
1998 Alfred Stock Memorial Prize

== Selected publications ==
Paetzold, P.: Chemie – Eine Einführung, Walter de Gruyter Berlin und New York, 2009, ISBN 978-3-11-020268-7
