= Bond Head =

Bond Head may refer to:

- Francis Bond Head (1793–1875), Lieutenant-Governor of Upper Canada during the Rebellion of 1837
- Bond Head, a rural community in Clarington, Durham, Ontario, Canada
- Bond Head, a community in Bradford West Gwillimbury, Ontario, Canada

== See also ==
- Band head
