= Double head =

Double head may refer to:

- Doublehead (1744–1807), one of the most feared warriors of the Cherokees during the Cherokee–American wars
- Double heading, the practice of using two locomotives to pull a train
- Band head § Double head, a spectral band with two heads
- Polycephaly, the condition of having more than one head.
