= Hans Bock =

Hans Bock may refer to:

- Hans Bock (painter) (1550–1624), German painter
- Hans Bock (chemist) (1928–2008), German chemist
- Hans Georg Bock (born 1948), German professor of mathematics and scientific computing
- Hans Bock (officer) (1919–1977), Major in the Wehrmacht during World War II
