= Julia Weinstein =

Chemist and academic

Julia A. Weinstein
- Education: Lomonosov Moscow State University
- Scientific career
- Workplaces: University of Sheffield; University of Nottingham

Julia A. Weinstein is a British Russian chemist who is a professor of physical chemistry at the University of Sheffield. Her research considers light matter interactions, including the dynamics of photo-excited electron transfer in condensed matter. She was awarded the Royal Society of Chemistry Chemical Dynamics Award in 2017.

== Early life and education ==
Weinstein completed her undergraduate degree and doctoral research at the Moscow Lomonosov State University, where she specialised in chemistry. After completing her doctorate, she joined the faculty in Moscow. She moved to the University of Nottingham as a Royal Society Fellow in 2000.

== Research and career ==
In 2004, Weinstein joined the University of Sheffield as an Advanced Research Fellow and Lecturer. She was promoted to professor of physical chemistry in 2016. Her research considers photoinduced charge transfer processes in functional materials. Weinstein uses ultrafast laser pulses to study energy transfer processes across multiple time scales, from femtoseconds to milliseconds. In particular, she is interested in electron and energy transfer in condensed matter, and the role of vibronic coupling. She identified that infrared pulses can be used to control chemical processes.

== Awards and honours ==
- 2003 Lomonosov Award in Science
- 2004 John Van Geuns Lecture
- 2017 RSC Chemical Dynamics Award

== Selected publications ==
- J A Gareth Williams; Andrew Beeby; E Stephen Davies; Julia A Weinstein; Claire Wilson (1 December 2003). "An alternative route to highly luminescent platinum(II) complexes: cyclometalation with N=C=N-coordinating dipyridylbenzene ligands". Inorganic Chemistry. 42 (26): 8609–8611. doi:10.1021/ic035083+. ISSN 0020-1669. PMID 14686833. Wikidata Q44700134.
- Stanley W Botchway; Mirren Charnley; John W Haycock; Anthony W Parker; David L Rochester; Julia A Weinstein; J A Gareth Williams (13 October 2008). "Time-resolved and two-photon emission imaging microscopy of live cells with inert platinum complexes". Proceedings of the National Academy of Sciences of the United States of America. 105 (42): 16071–16076. Bibcode:2008PNAS..10516071B. doi:10.1073/pnas.0804071105. ISSN 0027-8424. PMC 2570970. PMID 18852476. Wikidata Q33375595.
- C. Ed Whittle; Julia A. Weinstein; Michael W. George; Kirk S. Schanze (1 July 2001). "Photophysics of diimine platinum(II) bis-acetylide complexes". Inorganic Chemistry. 40 (16): 4053–4062. doi:10.1021/ic0102182. ISSN 0020-1669. PMID 11466068. Wikidata Q43683452.
