= Alfred Stock Memorial Prize =

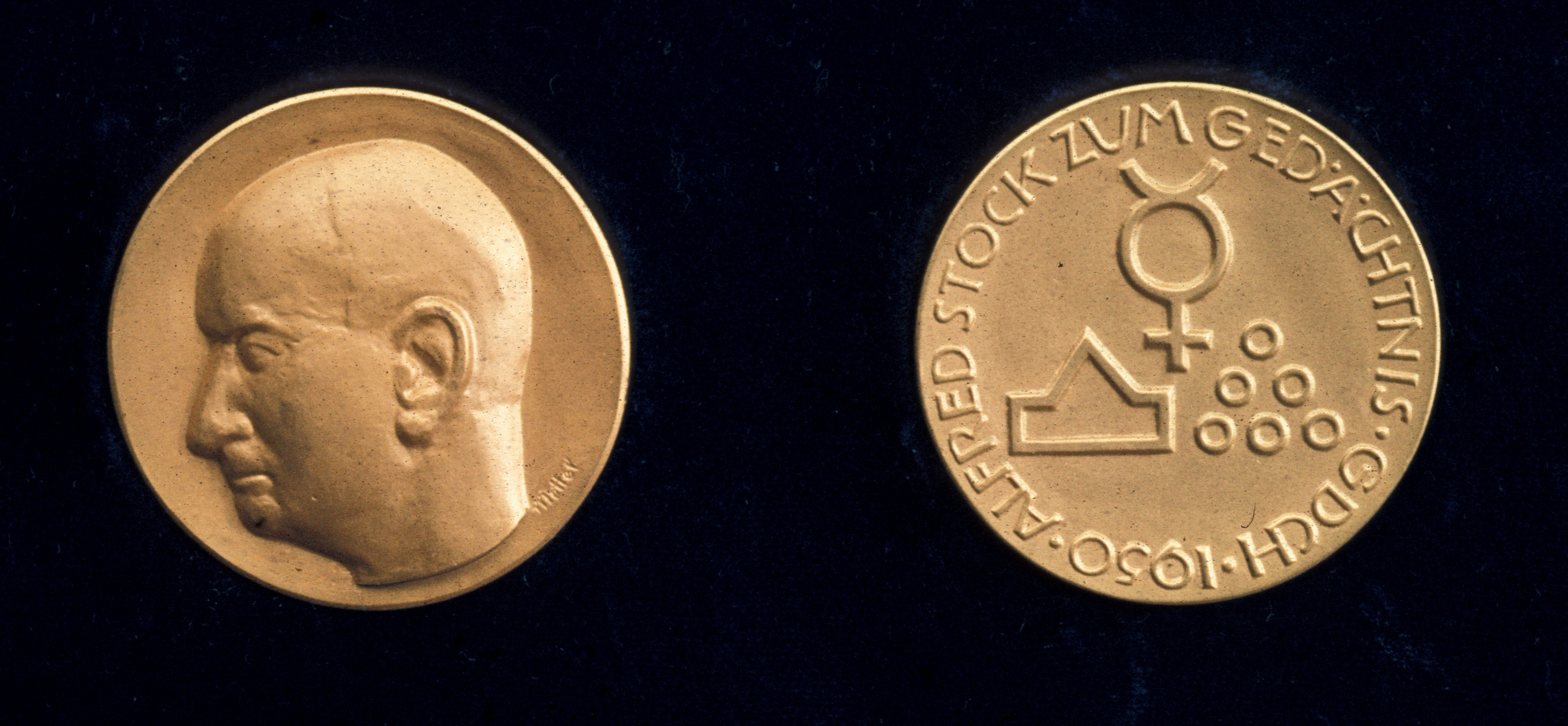
- The Alfred Stock Memorial Prize on both sides
- Awarded for: "An outstanding independent scientific experimental investigation in the field of inorganic chemistry."
- Date: 1950
- Country: International
- Presented by: Gesellschaft Deutscher Chemiker, Germany

The Marianne Baudler Prize, known before 2023 as the Alfred-Stock Memorial Prize or Alfred-Stock-Gedächtnispreis, is an award for "an outstanding independent scientific experimental investigation in the field of inorganic chemistry." It is awarded biennially (originally annually) by the German Chemical Society (Gesellschaft Deutscher Chemiker). The award, consisting of a gold medal and money, was created in 1950 in recognition of the pioneering achievements in inorganic chemistry by the German chemist Alfred Stock. In 2022, the GDCh board decided to change the name of the previous Alfred Stock Memorial Prize. The new name is Marianne Baudler Prize.

== Recipients ==
- 1950 Egon Wiberg, München
- 1951 Walter Hieber, München
- 1952 Robert Schwarz, Aachen
- 1953 Josef Goubeau, Stuttgart
- 1954 Harry Julius Emeléus, Cambridge
- 1955 Ulrich Hofmann, Darmstadt
- 1956 Hermann Irving Schlesinger, Chicago
- 1958 Rudolf Scholder, Karlsruhe
- 1959 Ernst Otto Fischer, München
- 1961 Margot Becke-Goehring, Heidelberg
- 1963 Friedrich Seel, Saarbrücken
- 1964 Werner Fischer, Hannover
- 1967 Harald Schäfer, Münster
- 1970 Gerhard Fritz, Karlsruhe
- 1972 Max Schmidt, Würzburg
- 1974 Rudolf Hoppe, Gießen
- 1976 Heinrich Nöth, München
- 1979 Ulrich Wannagat, Braunschweig
- 1981 Hans Georg von Schnering, Stuttgart
- 1982 Hubert Schmidbaur, München
- 1983 Eugene G. Rochow, Captiva, Florida, USA
- 1986 Marianne Baudler, Köln
- 1988 Helmut Werner, Würzburg
- 1990 Herbert W. Roesky, Göttingen
- 1992 Gottfried Huttner, Heidelberg
- 1994 Otto J. Scherer, Kaiserslautern
- 1996 Martin Jansen, Bonn
- 1998 Peter Paetzold, Aachen
- 2000 Achim Müller, Bielefeld
- 2002 Peter Jutzi, Bielefeld
- 2004 Hansgeorg Schnöckel, Karlsruhe
- 2006 Karl Otto Christe, Los Angeles/USA
- 2008 Michael Lappert, Brighton/GB
- 2010 Matthias Driess, Berlin
- 2012 Werner Uhl, Münster
- 2014 Wolfgang Kaim, Stuttgart
- 2016 Holger Braunschweig, Würzburg
- 2018 Christian Limberg, Berlin
- 2020 Stefanie Dehnen, Marburg
- 2022 Franc Meyer, Göttingen (GDCh Prize for Inorganic Chemistry)
- 2024 Peter W. Roesky, Karlsruhe

== See also ==
- List of chemistry awards
