= Rolf Appel =

German chemist (1921–2012)

Rolf Appel (25 February 1921 – 30 January 2012) was a German inorganic chemist who worked in the area of organophosphorus chemistry.

== Career ==
Appel received his vordiplom at Halle in 1941 and, after the war, completed his diplomarbeit also at Halle in 1945. During this time, he was influenced by G. O. Schenck and Karl Ziegler. Several years after the war, he entered the graduate program at Heidelberg, receiving his PhD for studies on disulfur trioxide at age 30. His supervisor was the renowned Margot Becke-Goehring. He was appointed to the University of Bonn in 1962, where he remained throughout his career. Among his many innovations at Bonn, he developed the Appel reaction, for which he received the Liebig Medal. He retired from the inorganic institute in 1986, and was succeeded by Edgar Niecke, also a phosphorus chemist.

The Appel reaction is an organic reaction that converts an alcohol into an alkyl chloride using triphenylphosphine and carbon tetrachloride.
