= Wolfgang Kaim =

German chemist (born 1951)

- Born: 13 May 1951 (age 74); Bad Vilbel, Germany
- Scientific career
- Fields: Chemistry

Wolfgang Kaim (born 13 May 1951 in Bad Vilbel, Germany) is a German chemist who held the chair of coordination chemistry at the University of Stuttgart. He is co-author of the internationally recognized book, Bioinorganic Chemistry which was awarded with the Literature Award of the German Chemical Industry.

== Career ==
Kaim studied chemistry and physics at the University of Frankfurt and the University of Konstanz. His diploma thesis in physical organic chemistry was supervised by E. Daltrozzo (1974). He started working on main group radicals in Hans Bock's group at the University of Frankfurt, where he earned his PhD in 1978. After a post-doctoral year with F. A. Cotton at Texas A&M University, supported by a postdoctoral Liebig Fellowship, he completed his habilitation for inorganic chemistry in 1982 ("Coordination Chemistry of Reduced Heterocycles"). Kaim continued his independent research career at the University of Frankfurt with a Winnacker Fellowship followed by a Heisenberg Fellowship. In 1987 he moved to the University of Stuttgart to take up a chaired position for coordination chemistry until 2019.

Kaim is an adjunct professor at the Northern Illinois University (USA), and has been visiting professor at the Sun Yat-sen University in Guangzhou (China), guest professor at the Universidad de Chile in Santiago (Chile), the University of Concepción (Chile) and the Indian Institute of Technology Bombay (India).

He has been the advisor of more than 70 PhD students.

In 2014 he was awarded the Alfred Stock Memorial Prize by the Gesellschaft Deutscher Chemiker (GDCh). In the same year he received the L. F. Leloir Award from Argentina.

== Research ==
Kaim's interdisciplinary research covers the areas of radical stabilization by metal coordination ('non-innocent ligands'), coenzyme models, the extension of mixed-valence chemistry, electron transfer effects on M-C and M-H bonds, the crystallization of new organic radicals and the electron transfer properties of boron compounds, as well as spectroelectrochemistry in the IR, UV/VIS/near-infrared regions as spectroscopic probes for electron transfer sites and the consequences of electron transfer or charge transfer on structure and bonding, EPR spectroscopy as a less common but highly useful methodology and CV (cyclic voltammetry).

He is the co-author of more than 700 publications in peer-reviewed journals.

== Publications ==
=== Journals ===
- Kaim, Wolfgang; Fiedler, Jan (2009). "Spectroelectrochemistry: the best of two worlds". Chemical Society Reviews. 38 (12). Royal Society of Chemistry (RSC): 3373–3382. doi:10.1039/b504286k. ISSN 0306-0012. PMID 20449056.
- Kaim, Wolfgang; Schwederski, Brigitte (2010). "Non-innocent ligands in bioinorganic chemistry—An overview". Coordination Chemistry Reviews. 254 (13–14). Elsevier BV: 1580–1588. doi:10.1016/j.ccr.2010.01.009. ISSN 0010-8545.
- Kaim, Wolfgang (2011). "Concepts for metal complex chromophores absorbing in the near infrared". Coordination Chemistry Reviews. 255 (21–22). Elsevier BV: 2503–2513. doi:10.1016/j.ccr.2011.01.014. ISSN 0010-8545.
- Kaim, Wolfgang (2012). "The Shrinking World of Innocent Ligands: Conventionaland Non‐Conventional Redox‐Active Ligands". European Journal of Inorganic Chemistry. 2012 (3). Wiley: 343–348. doi:10.1002/ejic.201101359. ISSN 1434-1948.
- Kaim, Wolfgang; Paretzki, Alexa (2017). "Interacting metal and ligand based open shell systems: Challenges for experiment and theory". Coordination Chemistry Reviews. 344. Elsevier BV: 345–354. doi:10.1016/j.ccr.2016.12.008. ISSN 0010-8545.
- Kaim, Wolfgang; Lahiri, Goutam Kumar (2019). "The coordination potential of indigo, anthraquinone and related redox-active dyes". Coordination Chemistry Reviews. 393. Elsevier BV: 1–8. doi:10.1016/j.ccr.2019.05.002. ISSN 0010-8545. S2CID 181617052.
- Kaim, Wolfgang; Das, Atanu; Fiedler, Jan; Záliš, Stanislav; Sarkar, Biprajit (1 February 2020). "NO and NO2 as non-innocent ligands: A comparison". Coordination Chemistry Reviews. 404 213114. doi:10.1016/j.ccr.2019.213114. ISSN 0010-8545. S2CID 209708580.
- Kaim, Wolfgang (13 March 2020). "Sites of Electron Transfer Reactivity in Organometallic Compounds". European Journal of Inorganic Chemistry. 2020 (11–12). Wiley: 875–878. doi:10.1002/ejic.202000107. ISSN 1434-1948. S2CID 216455791.

=== Books ===
English

- Kaim, Wolfgang (2013). Bioinorganic chemistry : inorganic elements in the chemistry of life: an introduction and guide. Chichester, West Sussex, United Kingdom: Wiley. ISBN 978-1-118-65926-7. OCLC 831150651.

German

- Kaim, Wolfgang; Schwederski, Brigitte (2005). "Bioanorganische Chemie". Teubner Studienbücher Chemie. Wiesbaden: Vieweg+Teubner Verlag. doi:10.1007/978-3-663-01605-2. ISBN 978-3-519-33505-4. ISSN 0941-3677.
