= Hans Bock (chemist) =

German chemist (1928–2008)

- Born: 28 October 1928; Hamburg, Germany
- Died: 21 January 2008 (aged 79); Königstein im Taunus, Germany
- Education: Ludwig-Maximilians-Universität München
- Known for: super silyl group
- Scientific career
- Fields: Chemist
- Workplaces: Goethe University Frankfurt
- Doctoral advisor: Egon Wiberg
- Doctoral students: Wolfgang Kaim

Hans Bock (5 October 1928 – 21 January 2008) was a German chemist born in Hamburg and died in Königstein im Taunus.

== Career ==
Hans Bock studied chemistry at the Ludwig-Maximilians-Universität München, where he received his PhD in 1958 for his work on water-free hydrazine in the group of Egon Wiberg. In 1964, he received his postdoctoral lecture qualification after work on phosphorus containing diacenes in the same research group. Subsequently, he had a three-year visit in the group of Edgar Heilbronner at ETH Zurich in Switzerland, where he worked on applications of the HMO-model, leading to the textbook: The HMO model and its application.

In 1968, he was announced full professor for inorganic chemistry at Goethe University Frankfurt.

== Research ==
Bock is the author and co-author of more than 500 publications in peer-reviewed journals. His research focused on preparation of element-organic compounds and their characterisation by appropriate physical measurement methods. Main focus was set on development and application of X-ray photoelectron spectroscopy (XPS) for detection and characterisation of transient molecules.

He proposed the use of the super silyl group in 1993.

== Literature ==
- The HMO model and its application by Edgar Heilbronner and Hans Bock, translated by W. Martin and A. J. Rackstraw

== Recognition ==
He was an external member of Max-Planck-Gesellschaft and became adjunct professor at University of Michigan (Ann Arbor) and the Technical University of Munich. He received two honorary doctorates by the University of Hamburg and the University of Montpellier in France.

In 1987, he received the Wilhelm-Klemm-Award by the Gesellschaft Deutscher Chemiker (GDCh).
