= Gregory H. Robinson =

American inorganic chemist

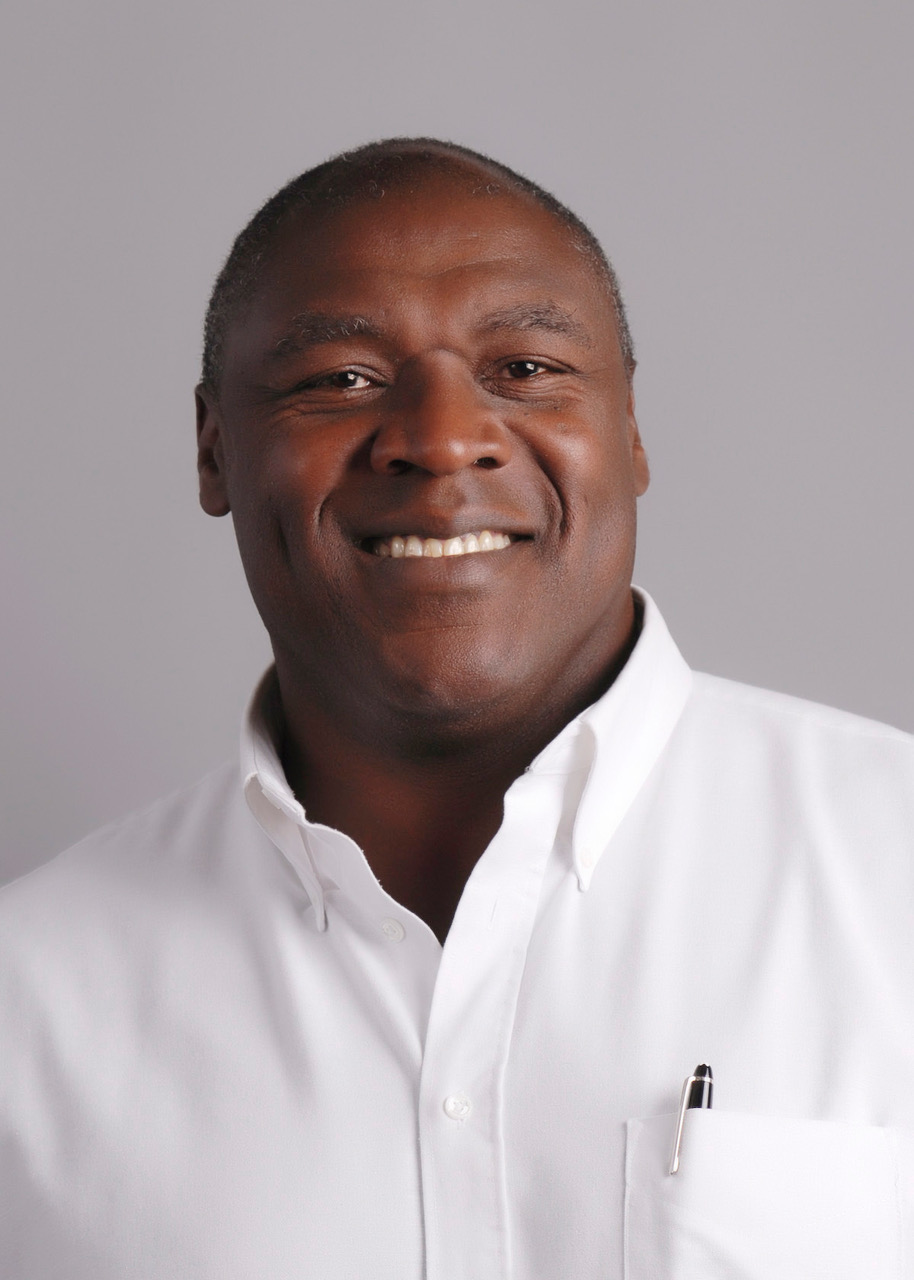
- Born: Gregory Heagward Robinson; Anniston, Alabama.
- Education: Jacksonville State University B.S. in Chemistry (1980) The University of Alabama Ph.D. in Chemistry (1984)
- Awards: Lamar Dodd Award (2010); F. Albert Cotton Award in Synthetic Inorganic Chemistry (2013); Humboldt Research Award (2012); SEC Faculty Achievement Award (2014); Fellow of the Royal Society of Chemistry (2017); Elected to the National Academy of Sciences (2021)
- Scientific career
- Workplaces: Clemson University (1984-1995); The University of Georgia (1995-now)
- Thesis: A synthetic and structural investigation of the interactions between aluminum alkyls and macrocyclic polyethers (1984)
- Website: www.gregoryhrobinson.com

Gregory H. Robinson FRSC is an American synthetic inorganic chemist and a Foundation Distinguished Professor of Chemistry at the University of Georgia. Robinson's research focuses on unusual bonding motifs and low oxidation state chemistry of molecules containing main group elements such as boron, gallium, germanium, phosphorus, magnesium, and silicon. He has published over 150 research articles, and was elected to the National Academy of Sciences in 2021.

== Education ==
Robinson received his B.S. from Jacksonville State University (1980) and his Ph.D. from the University of Alabama (1984). He joined the faculty at the University of Georgia in 1995.

== Discoveries ==
Robinson has made a number of seminal discoveries in the field of synthetic inorganic chemistry. Many of these discoveries have concerned unusual molecules involving the main group elements.

Aromatic molecules constitute a particularly important class of organic compounds. In general, aromatic molecules contain planar carbon-based cyclic ring systems. In addition, aromatic molecules also possess enhanced stability due to electron delocalization. The iconic aromatic molecule is benzene, C_{6}H_{6}. Inherent in the traditional concept of aromaticity, is the fact that metals were considered incapable of displaying traditional aromatic behavior. Robinson discovered that the main group metal gallium, if properly constrained, could exhibit aromatic behavior. Robinson's group prepared a compound that contained a three-membered ring of gallium atoms in a dianion, [R_{3}Ga_{3}]^{2-} (R = large organic ligand). This [R_{3}Ga_{3}]^{2-} dianion was found to be isoelectronic with the aromatic triphenylcyclopropenium cation, [Ph_{3}C_{3}]^{+}. Thus, the concept of “metalloaromaticity”, the proposition that a metallic ring system could display traditional aromatic behavior historically restricted to carbon ring systems (i.e., benzene), was experimentally realized.

The chemistry of boron, the fifth element on the Periodic Table, is as rich as it is varied. However, boron had not been shown to engage in robust multiple bonding like its periodic neighbor carbon. Robinson utilized a class of organic bases known as carbenes (L:) to prepare the first neutral compound containing a boron-boron double bond, the first diborene, with the synthesis and molecular structure of L:(H)B=B(H):L. The chemistry of molecules containing boron-boron multiple bonds is now a thriving area of research.

Robinson utilized a similar technique to prepare a highly unusual compound containing a silicon-silicon double bond, with both silicon atoms residing in the formal oxidation state of zero, L:Si=Si:L. Essentially, this compound represented a means to stabilize the highly reactive diatomic allotropes of silicon at room temperature. Since this discovery, several other molecules have subsequently been prepared including diphosphorus.

== Publications ==
Robinson has published over 150 research articles, including:

- Wang, Y.; Quillian, B.; Wei, P.; Wannere, C. S.; Xie, Y.; King, R. B.; Schaefer, H. F. III; Schleyer, P. V. R.; and Robinson, G. H., “A Stable Neutral Diborene Containing a B=B Double Bond”, Journal of the American Chemical Society 2007, 129, 12412–12413.
- Wang, Y.; Xie, Y.; Wei, P.; King, R. B.; Schaefer, H. F. III; Schleyer, P. V. R.; and Robinson, G. H., “Carbene-Stabilized Diphosphorus”, Journal of the American Chemical Society 2008, 130, 14970–14971.
- Wang, Y.; Xie, Y.; Wei, P.; King, R. B.; Schaefer, H. F. III; Schleyer, P. V. R.; and Robinson, G. H., “A Stable Silicon (0) Compound with a Si=Si Double Bond”, Science 2008, 321, 1069–1071.
- Wang, Y.; Chen, M.; Xie, Y.; Wei, P.; Schaefer, H. F. III; Schleyer, P. V. R.; and Robinson, G. H., "Stabilization of Elusive Silicon Oxides", Nature Chemistry 2015, 7, 509–513.
- Wang, Y.; Hickox, H. P.; Xie, Y.; Wei, P.; Blair, S. A.; Johnson, M. K.; Schaefer, H. F. III; and Robinson, G. H., “A Stable Anionic Dithiolene Radical”, Journal of the American Chemical Society. 2017, 139, 6859–6862.
- Wang, Y.; Xie, Y.; Wei, P.; Blair, S. A.; Cui, D.; Johnson, M. K.; Schaefer, H. F. III.; and Robinson, G. H., "Stable Boron Dithiolene Radicals", Angewandte Chemie, International Edition 2018, 57, 7865–7868.
- Wang, Y.; Xie, Y.; Wei, P.; Schaefer, H. F. III.; and Robinson, G. H., “Redox Chemistry of an Anionic Dithiolene Radical”, Dalton Transactions 2019, 48, 3543–3546.
- Wang, Y.; Tope, C. A.; Xie, Y.; Wei, P.; Urbauer, J. L.; Schaefer, H. F. III.; and Robinson, G. H., "Carbene-Stabilized Disilicon-Transfer Agent: Synthesis of a Diatonic Silicon Tris(dithiolene) Complex", Angewandte Chemie, International Edition 2020, 59, 8864–8867.
- Wang, Y.; Xie, Y.; Wei, P.; Blair, S. A.; Cui, D.; Johnson, M. K.; Schaefer, H. F. III.; and Robinson, G. H., "A Stable Naked Dithiolene Radical Anion and Synergic THF Ring-Opening", Journal of the American Chemical Society 2020, 142, 17301–17305.
- Wang, Y.; Tran, P. M.; Xie, Y.; Wei, P.; Glushka, J. N.; Schaefer, H. F. III.; and Robinson, G. H., "Carbene-Stabilized Dithiolene (L^{0}) Zwitterions", Angewandte Chemie, International Edition 2021, 60, 22706–22710.

== Awards ==
- Sigma Xi Distinguished Lecturer (2004–2005)
- Lamar Dobb Creative Research Award (2010)
- Humboldt Research Award (2012)
- F. Albert Cotton Award in Synthetic Inorganic Chemistry (2013)
- SEC Faculty Achievement Award (2014)
- Fellow of the Royal Society of Chemistry (2017)
- Elected to the National Academy of Sciences (2021)
