= Appel reaction =

Organic reaction in chemistry

Named after	Rolf Appel
Reaction type	Substitution reaction

Identifiers
Organic Chemistry Portal	appel-reaction
RSC ontology ID	RXNO:0000406

The Appel reaction is an organic reaction that converts an alcohol into an alkyl chloride using triphenylphosphine and carbon tetrachloride. The use of carbon tetrabromide or bromine as a halide source will yield alkyl bromides, whereas using carbon tetraiodide, methyl iodide or iodine gives alkyl iodides. The reaction is credited to and named after Rolf Appel; however, it had been described earlier. The use of this reaction is becoming less common, due to carbon tetrachloride being restricted under the Montreal Protocol.

The Appel reaction

Drawbacks to the reaction are the use of toxic halogenating agents and the coproduction of organophosphorus product that must be separated from the organic product. The phosphorus reagent can be used in catalytic quantities. The corresponding alkyl bromide can also be synthesised by addition of lithium bromide as a source of bromide ions. A more sustainable version of the Appel reaction has been reported, which uses a catalytic amount of phosphine that is regenerated with oxalyl chloride.

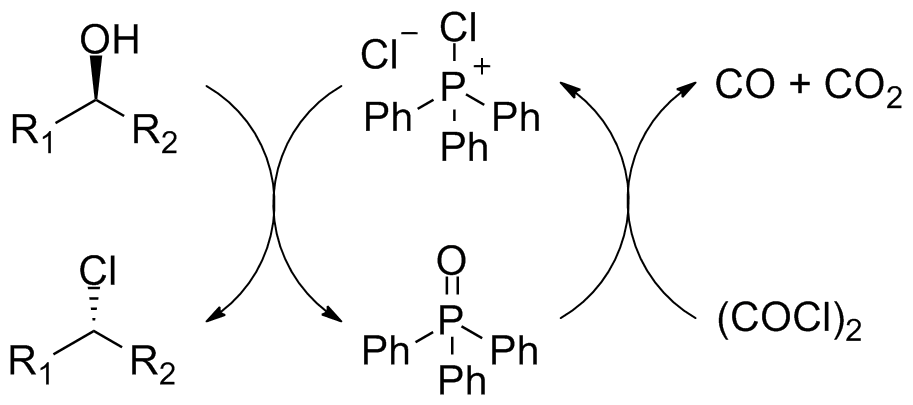
Catalytic Appel reaction scheme

== Mechanism ==
The Appel reaction begins with the formation of the phosphonium salt 3, which is thought to exist as a tight ion pair with 4 and therefore is unable to undergo an alpha-elimination to give dichlorocarbene. Deprotonation of the alcohol, forming chloroform, yields an alkoxide 5. The nucleophilic displacement of the chloride by the alkoxide yields intermediate 7. With primary and secondary alcohols, the halide reacts in a S_{N}2 process forming the alkyl halide 8 and triphenylphosphine oxide. Tertiary alcohols form the products 6 and 7 via a S_{N}1 mechanism.

The driving force behind this and similar reactions is the formation of the strong PO double bond. The reaction is somewhat similar to the Mitsunobu reaction, where the combination of an organophosphine as an oxide acceptor, an azo compound as a hydrogen acceptor reagent, and a nucleophile are used to convert alcohols to esters and other applications like this.

The mechanism of the Appel reaction

Illustrative use of the Appel reaction is the chlorination of geraniol to geranyl chloride.

== Modifications ==
The Appel reaction is also effective on carboxylic acids and has been used to convert them to oxazolines, oxazines and thiazolines. This is achieved via the interception of the acyloxytriphenylphosphonium intermediate with an amino alcohol (in the case of oxazoline and oxazine synthesis) as opposed to the chloride anion. The alcohol in the resulting amide is converted to the triphenylphosonium oxide, upon which an intramolecular S_{N}2 process forms the cyclic product.

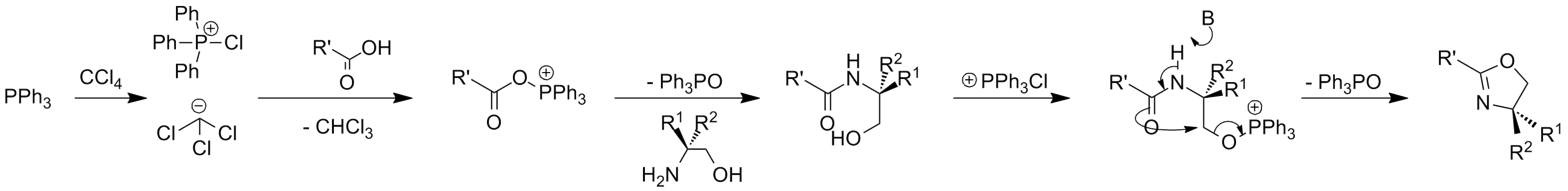

== See also ==
- Atherton–Todd reaction
- Corey–Fuchs reaction
- Mitsunobu reaction
