= Atherton–Todd reaction =

Chemical reaction

| Named after | Frank R. Atherton; Alexander R. Todd |
| Reaction type | Substitution reaction |

Identifiers
| RSC ontology ID | RXNO:0000690 |

The Atherton-Todd reaction is a name reaction in organic chemistry, which goes back to the British chemists F. R. Atherton, H. T. Openshaw and A. R. Todd. These described the reaction for the first time in 1945 as a method of converting dialkyl phosphites into dialkyl chlorophosphates. The dialkyl chlorophosphates formed are often too reactive to be isolated, though. For this reason, the synthesis of phosphates or phosphoramidates can follow the Atherton-Todd reaction in the presence of alcohols or amines. The following equation gives an overview over the Atherton-Todd reaction using the reactant dimethyl phosphite as an example:

Atherton-Todd-Reaktion

The reaction takes place after the addition of tetrachloromethane and a base. This base is usually a primary, secondary or tertiary amine. Instead of methyl groups other alkyl or benzyl groups may be present.

== Reaction mechanism ==
A possible reaction mechanism for the Atherton-Todd reaction is presented here for the example of dimethylphosphite, just like in the overview reaction:

Erster Teil des Reaktionsmechanismus der Atherton-Todd-Reaktion

First, a tertiary amine is used to cleave a methyl group of dimethyl phosphite. The intermediate 1 results from this reaction step.

Zweiter Teil des Reaktionsmechanismus der Atherton-Todd-Reaktion

Subsequently, the intermediate 1 deprotonates the starting compound dimethylphosphite, so that intermediates 2a and intermediates 2b are formed. The intermediate 1 is then regenerated from the intermediate 2a.

Dritter Teil des Reaktionsmechanismus der Atherton-Todd-Reaktion

Finally, intermediate 2b is chlorinated by tetrachloromethane and dimethyl chlorophosphate 3 is formed.

== Possible subsequent reactions ==
After the synthesis of the dimethyl chlorophosphate, a further reaction (for example with a primary amine like aniline) is possible by the following reaction equation:

Weiterer Reaktionsverlauf durch Zugabe von Anilin

== Atom economy ==
In this reaction, in addition to the starting compound dialkyl phosphite, tetrachloromethane and a base (an amine) are used in stoichiometric amounts. Only chloroform, which occurs after two reaction steps from tetrachloromethane, is relevant as a waste product for the assessment of the atomic economy. It should furthermore be kept in mind that the product of the reaction has a greater molar mass than the starting compound. The atom economy of this reaction can therefore be classified as relatively good.

== See also ==
The Atherton-Todd reaction is related to the Appel reaction. In the Appel reaction, tetrachloromethane is used for chlorination as well.
