= Diborane(2) =

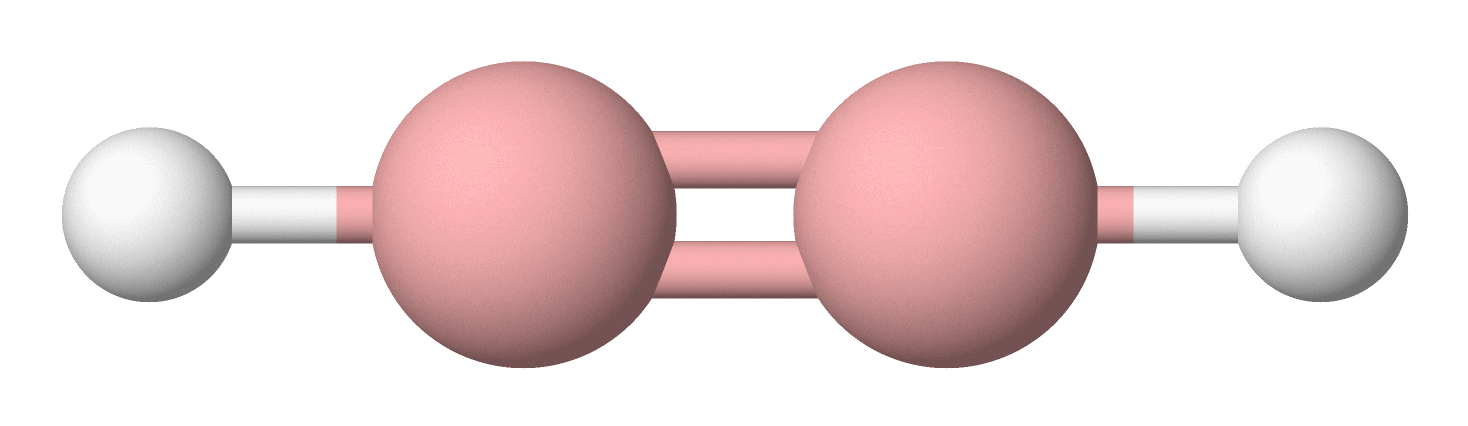

Names
- IUPAC name Diborene

Identifiers
3D model (JSmol)	Interactive image
ChemSpider	24807783
PubChem CID	15334965
- InChI: InChI=1S/B2H2/c1-2/h1-2H Key: HWGHUECIBSMKRW-UHFFFAOYSA-N
- SMILES: B=B

Properties
Chemical formula	B_{2}H_{2}
Molar mass	23.64 g·mol^{−1}
- Except where otherwise noted, data are given for materials in their standard state (at 25 °C [77 °F], 100 kPa). Infobox references

Diborane(2), also known as diborene, is an inorganic compound with the formula B_{2}H_{2}. The number 2 in diborane(2) indicates the number of hydrogen atoms bonded to the boron complex. There are other forms of diborane with different numbers of hydrogen atoms, including diborane(4) and diborane(6).

Diborane(2) is a highly reactive molecule that rapidly decomposes, making it a challenge to study experimentally under ambient conditions. To observe diborane(2) experimentally, high-vacuum and low temperature conditions using matrix isolation techniques are required, such as trapping the molecule in inert matrices like neon or argon. As a result of these difficult synthesis conditions, its properties and behaviour have been predominantly studied using theoretical models and computational simulations.

Diborene also refers to a series of molecules with the formula R:(BH)=(BH):R or R-B=B-R where R is an organic group. Diborene derivatives are relatively stable and can be stored at room temperature under inert conditions. They have been synthesized and characterized experimentally, and have shown potential in a variety of applications.

== Synthesis ==
The first experiment that lead to the synthesis of diborane(2) was via pulsed laser ablation of boron in a mixed hydrogen-argon gas atmosphere. Upon cooling the mixture, the argon gas changed into a solid, thereby stabilizing the trapped diboranes. The reaction involved two boron monohydrides coming together to form diborane(2), with the reaction being exothermic by 117kcal/mol. The diborane(2) was characterized by a broad band with a sharp peak at 2679.9 cm^{–1}, corresponding to the antisymmetric stretching mode of B-H.

Following this experiment, there have been other methods of diborane(2) preparation by decomposition of gaseous B_{2}H_{6} via photoionization, electron bombardment, X-irradiation, high-temperature reactions, and pulsed laser vaporization.

Since diborene derivatives are more stable than diborane(2), various methods have been used to synthesize them. They have been primarily made by reacting diboron compounds with organic molecules and the reduction of boron-containing precursors. Additionally, the diborene group can be protected by a suitable ligand, which prevents other side reactions.

== Structure and properties ==
A combination of experimental and theoretical data has been used to determine the structure and properties of diborane(2).

Theoretical data found that the molecule has a ^{3}Σ_{g}^{−} ground state, indicating a particular orientation with threefold rotational symmetry and a vertical mirror plane. It maintains its structure when rotated 180 degrees about an axis perpendicular to the mirror plane, and has a D_{∞}h symmetry point group.

This theoretical data was confirmed experimentally, which found the molecule to be linear with a triplet ground state, as revealed by electron paramagnetic resonance. The study noted that the molecule is similar to acetylene, with one electron removed from each of the pi molecular orbitals. Therefore, the molecular orbital diagram contains electrons in three orbitals; including a sigma bonding orbital with paired electrons at the lowest energy level, and two degenerate pi bonding orbitals that each have an unpaired electron. Thus, the B-B bond has a partial double bond character, explaining the high reactivity of these compounds.

== Applications ==
Diborenes have potential applications in materials science, catalysis and sustainable energy chemistry.

According to theoretical studies, diborane(2) has potential applications in nanodevices. It is predicted that diborane(2) nanoribbons are structurally stable and semiconducting due to its flexible band tunability. Another theoretical study developed an optimization-based technique for designing and analyzing a B_{2}H_{2} system that use biomass to produce hydrogen, which they found could be a viable option for a sustainable energy system.

Diborene derivatives have been used extensively in catalysis. They have been found to catalyze hydroboration reactions, with the reaction being chemoselective. Additionally, diborenes can undergo inorganic–organic cross-metathesis reactions to afford a B,N-doped complex.
