= Lieselotte Feikes =

German industrial chemist

Lieselotte Feikes (1923 in Viersen - 29 January 2008) was a German chemist. She is known for her work in the leather chemistry and the development of wastewater treatment processes.

== Life ==
Starting in 1943, Feikes studied chemistry at the Halle University at the Institute of Karl Ziegler and at the Heidelberg University. She earned her doctorate with Margot Becke-Goehring at the Heidelberg University. In 1953, she joined the Carl Freudenberg Werke in Weinheim. She headed the leather laboratory for 20 years and developed wastewater treatment processes for wastewater treatment plants. Since the beginning of the 1970s, she was responsible for environmental protection in the company. In 1983, she wrote the book "Ökologische Probleme der Lederindustrie". She was awarded the Order of Merit of the Federal Republic of Germany for her services to environmental protection. Feikes died on 29 January 2008 in Weinheim, Germany.

== Selected publications ==
- Ökologische Probleme der Lederindustrie (Ecological problems of the leather industry). Feikes, Lieselotte. Frankfurt am Main: Umschau Verlag. 1983. ISBN 978-3524820095. OCLC 635673542.
- Feikes, Lieselotte (1953). Über die Umsetzung zwischen Polythionat-Ionen und Schwefelwasserdampf (Doctoral thesis). Heidelberg.

== Awards ==
She received the following awards:

- 1979 Yearly prize of the Verein für Gerberei-Chemie
- 1984 Honorary member of the Verein Österreichischer Ledertechniker
- 1986 Order of Merit of the Federal Republic of Germany
- 1986 Arthur Wilson Memorial Lecture
