= Inorganic Chemistry (journal) =

- Discipline: Inorganic Chemistry
- Language: English
- Edited by: Stefanie Dehnen

Publication details
- History: 1962–present
- Publisher: American Chemical Society (United States)
- Frequency: Biweekly
- Impact factor: 4.6 (2022)

Standard abbreviations
- ISO 4: Inorg. Chem.

Indexing
- CODEN: INOCAJ
- ISSN: 0020-1669 (print); 1520-510X (web)
- LCCN: 63025878
- OCLC no.: 01753164

Links
- Journal homepage

Inorganic Chemistry is a biweekly peer-reviewed scientific journal published by the American Chemical Society since 1962. It covers research in all areas of inorganic chemistry.

The current editor-in-chief is Stefanie Dehnen (Karlsruhe Institute of Technology).

== Abstracting and indexing ==
The journal is abstracted and indexed in:

- Academic Search Premier
- Aquatic Sciences & Fisheries Abstracts
- Art Source
- Chemical Abstracts Core
- Chimica
- Compendex
- DIALNET
- EMBASE
- MEDLINE
- Science Citation Index Expanded
- Scopus

According to the Journal Citation Reports, the journal has a 2022 impact factor of 4.6.

== See also ==
- Organometallics
