= Boron monohydride =

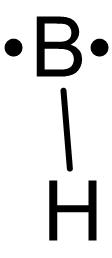

Names
- IUPAC name λ^{1}-borane

Identifiers
CAS Number	BH: 13766-26-2
3D model (JSmol)	BH: Interactive image; DB: Interactive image; TB: Interactive image
ChEBI	BH: CHEBI:38983
ChemSpider	BH: 4910333
Gmelin Reference	33
PubChem CID	BH: 6397184; DB: 11094539; TB: 58594784
- InChI: InChI=1S/BH/h1H Key: UWBOAQKPEXKXSU-UHFFFAOYSA-N; DB: InChI=1S/BH/h1H/i1D Key: UWBOAQKPEXKXSU-MICDWDOJSA-N; TB: InChI=1S/BH/h1H/i1T Key: UWBOAQKPEXKXSU-CNRUNOGKSA-N
- SMILES: BH: [BH]; DB: [2H][B]; TB: [3H][B]

Properties
Chemical formula	BH
Molar mass	11.82 g·mol^{−1}

Thermochemistry
Std molar entropy (S^{⦵}_{298})	172
Std enthalpy of formation (Δ_{f}H^{⦵}_{298})	442.7
Gibbs free energy (Δ_{f}G^{⦵})	412.7
- Except where otherwise noted, data are given for materials in their standard state (at 25 °C [77 °F], 100 kPa). Infobox references

Borane(1), boron monohydride, hydridoboron or borylene is the molecule with the formula BH. It exists as a gas but rapidly degrades when condensed. By contrast, the cluster B_{12}H_{12}^{2-} (dodecaborate), which has very similar empirical formula, forms robust salts.

== Formation ==
Boron monohydride can be formed from borane carbonyl exposed to ultraviolet light. BH_{3}CO → BH + CH_{2}O

Boron monohydride is formed when boron compounds are heated to a high temperature in the presence of hydrogen.

Boron monohydride is formed when the boron anion B^{−} reacts with a hydrogen ion H^{+}. It is also formed when atomic boron reacts with hydrogen. B + H_{2} → BH + H. There is too much energy in the reaction for BH_{2} to be stable.

Boron monohydride probably exists in sunspots, but as of 2008 has not been detected.

== Properties ==
The ionization potential is around 9.77 eV. The dissociation energy for the ground state molecule is 81.5 kcal/mol. The electron affinity is roughly 0.3 eV, and the HB^{−} ion is formed.

The dipole moment of the molecule in its ground state is 1.27 debye and for the first excited electronic state A^{1}Π is 0.58 debye.

The spectrum of boron monohydride includes a molecular band for the lowest electronic transition X^{1}Σ^{+} → A^{1}Π with a band head at 433.1 nm (for 0→0) and 437.1 (for 0→1) The spectrum contains P, Q, and R branches.

Although BH is a closed shell molecule, it is paramagnetic independent of temperature.

== Reactions ==
Boron monohydride is unstable in bulk and disappears quickly on a timescale of 20 ns when at a pressure of 20 Torr. Boron monohydride reacts with oxygen, probably forming HBO. Boron monohydride shows no reaction with methane, but reacts with propane to give C_{3}H_{7}BH_{2}. With nitric oxide (NO) it probably yields HBO and HBNO. Boron monohydride appears to add onto double bonds in unsaturated organic compounds. It also reacts with water.

Boron monohydride can take on the form of solid poly-borane(1) which spontaneously inflames in air.

Solid BH is predicted to take on an Ibam phase at pressures over 50 GPa and then become a metallic P6/mmm phase over 168 GPa.

== Ions ==
Both a cation and a dication are known. The dication HB^{2+} can be supported by a σ-donating ligand framework with two links. The dianion can also be stabilized by an amine.
