= Hansgeorg Schnöckel =

German chemist and university teacher

Hansgeorg Schnöckel, born 1941 in Marienburg, is a German chemist and emeritus Professor of analytical chemistry at the Karlsruhe Institute of Technology. He gained renown for studies on reduced silicon and aluminium compounds.

Schnöckel studied chemistry at the University of Münster under the direction of H. J. Becher focused on spectroscopic studies of boron compounds. In 1981, he finished his habilitation on matrix isolation of reactive silicon oxides. He was the Professor in Münster and at the Ludwig-Maximilians-Universität München. In 1993, he assumed the professorship in Karlsruhe.

[Cp*Al]_{4} was discovered by the Schnöckel group.

In 2004, he received the Alfred Stock prize.
