= Marianne Baudler =

German chemist

- Born: 27 April 1921; Stettin, Poland
- Died: 5 March 2003 (aged 81)
- Education: Technische Hochschule Dresden; University of Göttingen
- Occupation: Chemist

Marianne Baudler (27 April 1921 – 5 March 2003) was a German chemist. She is known for her research on phosphorus.

== Life ==
Marianne Baudler was born in Stettin. She started studying Chemistry at the Technische Hochschule Dresden in April 1940 and finished her studies with a Diplom in 1943. From 1943 to 1946, she worked on her dissertation in the group of Franz Fehér at the University of Göttingen. Starting in 1949, Baudler performed research at the University of Cologne. In 1952, she finished her habilitation. In 1963 she became extraordinary professor at the University of Cologne. In 1968, the full professorship followed. From 1986 on, she was an emeritus professor.

== Research ==
Her research focused on:

- Small-ring phosphorus compounds
- Phosphorus hydrides
- Polycyclic organophosphanes
- Mono- and polycyclic compounds of arsenic

== Selected publications ==
Brauer, Georg; Baudler, Marianne, eds. (1975). Handbuch der präparativen anorganischen Chemie / 1 (3. ed.). Stuttgart: Enke. ISBN 978-3432023281. OCLC 310719485.

== Awards ==
- Alfred Stork Memorial Prize in 1986
- Member of the Academy of Sciences Leopoldina starting in 1982
- Member of the Göttingen Academy of Sciences and Humanities starting in 1991
- Wiberg Lecture in 1992
