= Electron deficiency =

Species that violate the octet rule or have electron-acceptor properties

In chemistry, electron deficiency (and electron-deficient) is jargon that is used in two contexts: chemical species that violate the octet rule because they have too few valence electrons and species that happen to follow the octet rule but have electron-acceptor properties, forming donor-acceptor charge-transfer salts.

== Octet rule violations ==
Triphenylborane is classified as electron deficient.

Traditionally, "electron-deficiency" is used as a general descriptor for boron hydrides and other molecules which do not have enough valence electrons to form localized (2-centre 2-electron) bonds joining all atoms. For example, diborane (B_{2}H_{6}) would require a minimum of 7 localized bonds with 14 electrons to join all 8 atoms, but there are only 12 valence electrons. A similar situation exists in trimethylaluminium. The electron deficiency in such compounds is similar to metallic bonding.

== Electron-acceptor molecules ==
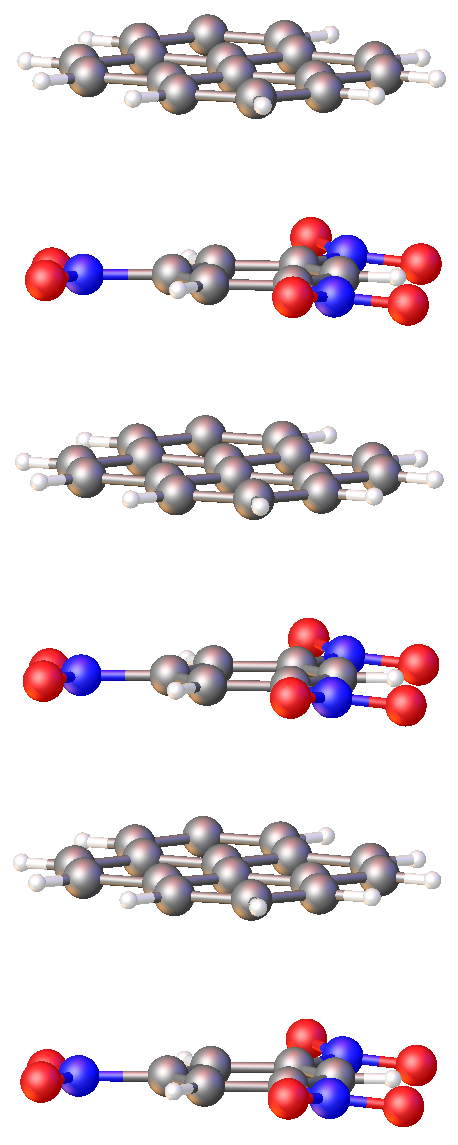
Structure of the charge-transfer complex between pyrene with the electron-deficient 1,3,5-trinitrobenzene.

Alternatively, electron-deficiency describes molecules or ions that function as electron acceptors. Such electron-deficient species obey the octet rule, but they have (usually mild) oxidizing properties. 1,3,5-Trinitrobenzene and related polynitrated aromatic compounds are often described as electron-deficient. Electron deficiency can be measured by linear free-energy relationships: "a strongly negative ρ value indicates a large electron demand at the reaction center, from which it may be concluded that a highly electron-deficient center, perhaps an incipient carbocation, is involved."
