= Egon Wiberg =

German chemistry professor (1901–1976)

Egon Gustaf Martin Wiberg (born 3 June 1901 in Güstrow; died 24 November 1976 in Munich) was a German chemist and professor of inorganic chemistry at LMU Munich.

== Life ==
Wiberg studied chemistry at the Technical University of Karlsruhe (TH Karlsruhe) since 1921 and completed his doctorate in 1927. He was an academic student of Stefan Goldschmidt and wrote his doctoral thesis on "Über den Abbau von Aminosäuren und Dipeptiden durch Hypobromit" ("On the degradation of amino acids and dipeptides by hypobromite"). In 1931, he completed his habilitation at the TH Karlsruhe. In 1936 he became an unscheduled professor at the TH Karlsruhe and in 1938 provisional head of the Extraordinariat (apl. Prof.) for Inorganic Chemistry at LMU Munich. Since 1943 he was co-editor of the "Lehrbuch der Chemie", founded by Arnold F. Holleman, which was published in 1955 as "Lehrbuch der Anorganischen Chemie". In 1951 he became a full professor and director of the Institute of Inorganic Chemistry at LMU Munich.

== Research ==
The fields of work were hydrides of the chemical elements beryllium, magnesium, boron, aluminium and other metals as well as phosphorus, boron, silicon and boron nitrogen compounds.

== Awards ==
- Alfred Stock Memorial Prize (1950)
- Member of the Bavarian Academy of Sciences and Humanities (1952)
- Member of the Academy of Sciences Leopoldina (1959)
- Honorary doctorate Dr. rer. nat. h. c. of the TH Aachen
- Honorary doctorate of the Technische Hochschule Wien (1965)
- Bavarian Order of Merit

A lecture series is named after him.

== Selected publications ==
- Holleman, Arnold F.; Wiberg, Egon; Wiberg, Nils (2016). Anorganische Chemie, Band 1, Grundlagen und Hauptgruppenelemente. Vol. 1 (103 ed.). Berlin: De Gruyter. ISBN 978-3-11-026932-1. OCLC 968134975.
- Holleman, Arnold F.; Wiberg, Egon; Wiberg, Nils (2016). Anorganische Chemie, Band 2, Nebengruppenelemente, Lanthanoide, Actinoide, Transactinoide. Vol. 1 (103 ed.). Berlin: De Gruyter. ISBN 978-3-11-049590-4. OCLC 960038226.
