= Metal aromaticity =

Concept of aromaticity extended to metals

Metal aromaticity or metalloaromaticity is the concept of aromaticity, found in many organic compounds, extended to metals and metal-containing compounds. The first experimental evidence for the existence of aromaticity in metals was found in aluminium cluster compounds of the type MAl^{−}_{4} where M stands for lithium, sodium or copper. These anions can be generated in a helium gas by laser vaporization of an aluminium / lithium carbonate composite or a copper or sodium / aluminium alloy, separated and selected by mass spectrometry and analyzed by photoelectron spectroscopy. The evidence for aromaticity in these compounds is based on several considerations. Computational chemistry shows that these aluminium clusters consist of a tetranuclear Al^{2−}_{4} plane and a counterion at the apex of a square pyramid. The Al^{2−}_{4} unit is perfectly planar and is not perturbed by the presence of the counterion or even the presence of two counterions in the neutral compound M_{2}Al_{4}. In addition its HOMO is calculated to be a doubly occupied delocalized pi system making it obey Hückel's rule. Finally a match exists between the calculated values and the experimental photoelectron values for the energy required to remove the first 4 valence electrons. The first fully metal aromatic compound was a cyclogallane with a Ga_{3}^{2-} core discovered by Gregory Robinson in 1995.

D-orbital aromaticity is found in trinuclear tungsten W_{3}O^{−}_{9} and molybdenum Mo_{3}O^{−}_{9} metal clusters generated by laser vaporization of the pure metals in the presence of oxygen in a helium stream. In these clusters the three metal centers are bridged by oxygen and each metal has two terminal oxygen atoms. The first signal in the photoelectron spectrum corresponds to the removal of the valence electron with the lowest energy in the anion to the neutral M_{3}O_{9} compound. This energy turns out to be comparable to that of bulk tungsten trioxide and molybdenum trioxide. The photoelectric signal is also broad which suggests a large difference in conformation between the anion and the neutral species. Computational chemistry shows that the M_{3}O^{−}_{9} anions and M_{3}O^{2−}_{9} dianions are ideal hexagons with identical metal-to-metal bond lengths. Tritantalum oxide clusters (Ta_{3}O_{3}^{−}) also are observed to exhibit possible D-orbital aromaticity.

The molecules discussed thus far only exist diluted in the gas phase. A study exploring the properties of a compound formed in water from sodium molybdate (Na_{2}MoO_{4}·2H_{2}O) and iminodiacetic acid also revealed evidence of aromaticity, but this compound has actually been isolated. X-ray crystallography showed that the sodium atoms are arranged in layers of hexagonal clusters akin to pentacenes. The sodium-to-sodium bond lengths are unusually short (327 pm versus 380 pm in elemental sodium) and, like benzene, the ring is planar. In this compound each sodium atom has a distorted octahedral molecular geometry with coordination to molybdenum atoms and water molecules. The experimental evidence is supported by computed NICS aromaticity values.

== See also ==
- Metal cluster compound – Cluster of three or more metals
- Catenation – Bonding of atoms of the same element into chains or rings
