= Band head =

In spectroscopy a band head is the abrupt edge of a spectroscopic band. When a band is described as degrading to the violet, it means that for wavelengths above the band head wavelength, the spectrum is dark as the band comes to a sudden stop(just above/after the head), and below the wavelength the brightness of the band weakens gradually. A band that degrades to the red, conversely means that the band head is a lower limit on wavelength for the band, and it fades off toward longer wavelengths, which in visible light is the red end of the spectrum.

If a band spectrum is examined at high resolution it consists of many lines. At a band head the numbers often increase to a limit, or otherwise a series of lines may approach from one side and then reverse at the band head. The lines pile up on top of each other at the band head, and may not be viewed separately. They have become unresolvable.

== Double head ==
Two bands may overlap with the head of one on top of another band or close to each other. This may make a stepped appearance. The two band heads close to each other are called a double head.

== Headless band ==
A headless band fades off at both ends with a maximum somewhere in the band.
