= C12H19N =

The molecular formula C_{12}H_{19}N (molar mass: 177.29 g/mol) may refer to:

- N,α-Diethylphenethylamine
- 2,6-Diisopropylaniline
- Isopropylamphetamine
- Propylamphetamine
- 4-Propylamphetamine
