= C2H4S2 =

The molecular formula C_{2}H_{4}S_{2} (molar mass: 92.18 g/mol, exact mass: 91.97544 u) may refer to:

- Isomers of dithietane
  - 1,2-Dithietane
  - 1,3-Dithietane
