= C4H6S =

The molecular formula C_{4}H_{6}S (molar mass: 86.16 g/mol, exact mass: 86.01902 u) may refer to:

- Dihydrothiophenes
  - 2,3-Dihydrothiophene
  - 2,5-Dihydrothiophene
- Divinyl sulfide
