= C9H9NO2 =

The molecular formula C_{9}H_{9}NO_{2} (molar mass: 163.17 g/mol, exact mass: 163.0633 u) may refer to:

- 2,6-Diacetylpyridine
- Phenyl-2-nitropropene (P2NP)
