= Dithietane =

Class of chemical compounds

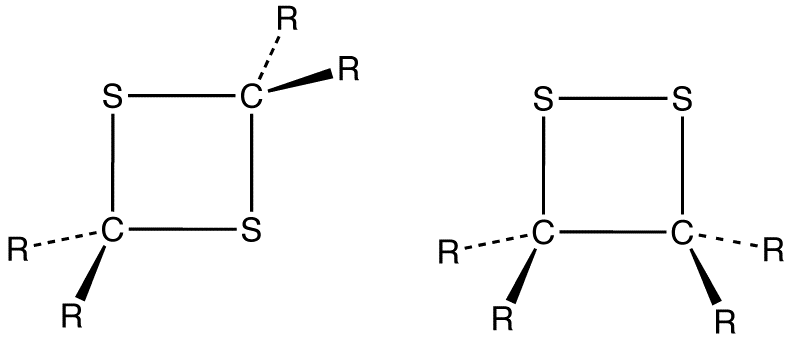
Structure of a 1,3-dithietane (left) and 1,2-dithietane (right), where R is an organic group

A dithietane is a saturated heterocyclic compound that contain two divalent sulfur atoms and two sp^{3}-hybridized carbon atoms. Two isomers are possible for this class of organosulfur compounds:

== 1,2-Dithietanes ==
1,2-dithietanes, 4-membered rings where the two sulfur atoms are adjacent, are very rare. The first stable 1,2-dithietane to be reported was the dithiatopazine, formed by intramolecular photodimerization of a bis(thionolactone):

Structure of dithiatopazine

Heating dithiatopazine generates eliminates the sulfur atoms as unstable disulfur, and other dithietanes are presumed to decompose similarly.

A stable 1,2-dithietane derivative is trans-3,4-diethyl-1,2-dithietane 1,1-dioxide:

Structure of trans-3,4-diethyl-1,2-dithietane 1,1-dioxide, the dimer of the onion lachrymatory agent

That compound is formed by the spontaneous dimerization of syn-propanethial-S-oxide, the lachrymatory agent found in onions.

Another derivative class of 1,2-dithietanes are the 1,2-dithietes, containing two adjacent sulfur atoms and two trigonal planar carbon centers.

== 1,3-Dithietanes ==
In 1,3-dithietanes, the sulfur atoms are non-adjacent. The functional group is used industrially in various biocides. Examples include the antibiotic Cefotetan and the pesticide Fosthietan.

1,3-Dithietane itself, a colorless, easily sublimed, crystalline, unpleasant-smelling solid with melting point 105-106 °C, was first prepared in 1976 by reaction of bis(chloromethyl) sulfoxide with sodium sulfide followed by THF-borane reduction of the first formed 1,3-dithietane 1-oxide:

Synthesis of 1,3-dithietane

Carbon-substituted 1,3-dithietanes are well known, with the first examples being described as early as 1872. Examples include 2,2,4,4-tetrachloro-1,3-dithietane, the photochemically-formed dimer of thiophosgene, and tetrakis(trifluoromethyl)-1,3-dithietane, [(CF_{3})_{2}CS]_{2}. Symmetric 1,3‑dithietanes are preferably synthesized from thiocarbonyl dimerization. Heating or irradiating dithietanes results in "dedimerization" to give the corresponding thiocarbonyl compounds.

Oxidized forms of 1,3-dithietane are well known, although they are often not prepared from the dithietane. Examples include the so-called zwiebelanes (2,3-dimethyl-5,6-dithiabicyclo[2.1.1]hexane S-oxides) from onion volatiles and 1,3-dithietane 1,1,3,3-tetraoxide, the so-called sulfene dimer:

Left: thiophosgene dimer, 2,2,4,4-tetrachloro-1,3-dithietane; center: a zwiebelane, found in onion volatiles; right: sulfene dimer

They are more acidic than acyclic disulfones, but even so are hard to alkylate.

In the desaurins, each carbon atom is attached to alkylidene substituents (i.e., a double bond).
