= Diisopinocampheylborane =

- Structure of (+)-Diisopinocampheylborane dimer

Names
- IUPAC name Di[(1S,2R,3S,5S)-pinan-3-yl]borane
- Systematic IUPAC name Bis[(1S,2S,3S,5R)-2,6,6-trimethylbicyclo[3.1.1]heptan-3-yl]borane
- Other names (+)-Di-3-pinanylborane; Diisopinocampheylborane; Ipc2BH dimer

Identifiers
CAS Number	21947-87-5
3D model (JSmol)	Interactive image
Abbreviations	Ipc_{2}BH
ChemSpider	10618744
PubChem CID	86278388
- InChI: InChI=1S/C20H35B/c1-11-15-7-13(19(15,3)4)9-17(11)21-18-10-14-8-16(12(18)2)20(14,5)6/h11-18,21H,7-10H2,1-6H3 Key: KBGJOMVTAXYPAG-UHFFFAOYSA-N; InChI=1/C20H35B/c1-11-15-7-13(19(15,3)4)9-17(11)21-18-10-14-8-16(12(18)2)20(14,5)6/h11-18,21H,7-10H2,1-6H3 Key: KBGJOMVTAXYPAG-UHFFFAOYAB
- SMILES: [H]B(C1CC2CC(C1(C))C2(C)(C))C3CC4CC(C3(C))C4(C)(C)

Properties
Chemical formula	C_{20}H_{35}B
Molar mass	286.31 g·mol^{−1}
Appearance	Colorless solid
Density	1.044 g/cm^{3}
- Except where otherwise noted, data are given for materials in their standard state (at 25 °C [77 °F], 100 kPa). Infobox references

Diisopinocampheylborane is an organoborane that is useful for asymmetric synthesis. This colourless solid is the precursor to a range of related reagents. The compound was reported in 1961 by Zweifel and Brown in a pioneering demonstration of asymmetric synthesis using boranes. The reagent is mainly used for the synthesis of chiral secondary alcohols. The reagent is often depicted as a monomer but like most hydroboranes, it is dimeric with B-H-B bridges.

== Preparation ==
Diisopinocampheylborane was originally prepared by hydroboration of excess α-pinene with borane, but it is now more commonly generated from borane-methyl sulfide (BMS).

The compound can be isolated as a solid, but because it is quite sensitive to water and air, it is often generated in situ and used as a solution. The synthesis is complicated by a number of factors, including the tendency of the compound to eliminate pinene.

Diisopinocampheylborane is often represented as a monomer (including in this article), but X-ray crystallography establishes a dimeric structure.

== Reactions ==
Oxidation of diisopinocampheylborane with basic hydrogen peroxide gives isopincampheol. Methanolysis gives methoxydiisopinocampheylborane

=== Hydroboration ===
Because of the large size of the α-pinenyl substituents, diisopinocampheylborane only hydroborates unhindered alkenes. These reactions proceed with high enantioselectivity. 2-Butene, 2-pentene, 3-hexene are converted to the respective chiral alcohols in high ee's. Norbornene under the same conditions gave an 83% ee. Heterocycles (dihydrofuran, dihydrothiophene, dihydropyrrole, tetrahydropyran) give the alcohols in ≥99% ee; the high ee's reflect their constrained conformations.

It adds to alkynes to form the corresponding vinyldiisopinocampheylboranes

In a highly stereoselective reaction, allyldiisopinocampheylboranes converts aldehydes to the homologated alcohols, rapidly even at -100 °C. The alkyldiisopinocampheylboranes, which result from the addition to alkenes, usefully react with a range of different reagents. Hydroxylamine-O-sulfonic acid provides 3-pinanamine.

Also useful is the reaction of diisopinocampheylborane with an aldehyde (RCHO) to give the chiral boronic ester, (isopinocampheyl)_{2}BOCH_{2}(R), which can be further used is a number of reactions e.g. Suzuki reaction.

== Related campheylboranes ==
Diisopinocampheylchloroborane

Alpine borane

Treatment of diisopinocampheylborane with TMEDA give the crystalline adduct of monoisopinocampheylborane. This adduct reacts with boron trifluoride to liberate the monoisopinocampheylborane (IpcBH_{2}) in 100% ee. Monoisopinocampheylborane reacts with a variety of alkenes. Two other reagents have been developed for the hydroboration of ketones:

In the above mechanism where G=O and R is Ipc and Cl or 9-Borabicyclononane. Diisopinocampheylchloroborane (Ipc_{2}BCl) is produced by treating diisopinocampheylborane with hydrogen chloride. The chloride is reported to be more stable that the trialkyl boranes, it works well with aryl alkyl ketones and tert-butyl alkyl ketones. Diisopinocampheylchloroborane is often complementary with diisopinocampheylborane, where one provides the R enantiomer and the other the S, the enantioselectivity is typically very high.

Alpine-borane is produced by hydroborating α-pinene with 9-borabicyclononane. Both of these reagents can be improved upon by using 2-ethylapopinene in place of α-pinene, 2-ethylapopinene has an ethyl group in place of the methyl in α-pinene. The additional steric bulk improves the stereoselectivity of the reduction.

Diisopinocampheylborane reacts with methanol to give diisopinocampheylmethoxyborane, which in turn reacts with an allyl or crotyl Grignard reagent to give B-allyldiisopinocampheylborane. This can then undergo an asymmetric allylboration to give a chiral homologated alcohol, which is a useful building block in a chiral synthesis.
