= Anexate =

Anexate is the trade name of two different drugs:

- Flumazenil, a benzodiazepine antagonist
- Mefenorex, a stimulant drug which was used as an appetite suppressant
