= Etilamfetamine =

Discontinued anorexiant

Ethylamphetamine INN: Etilamfetamine

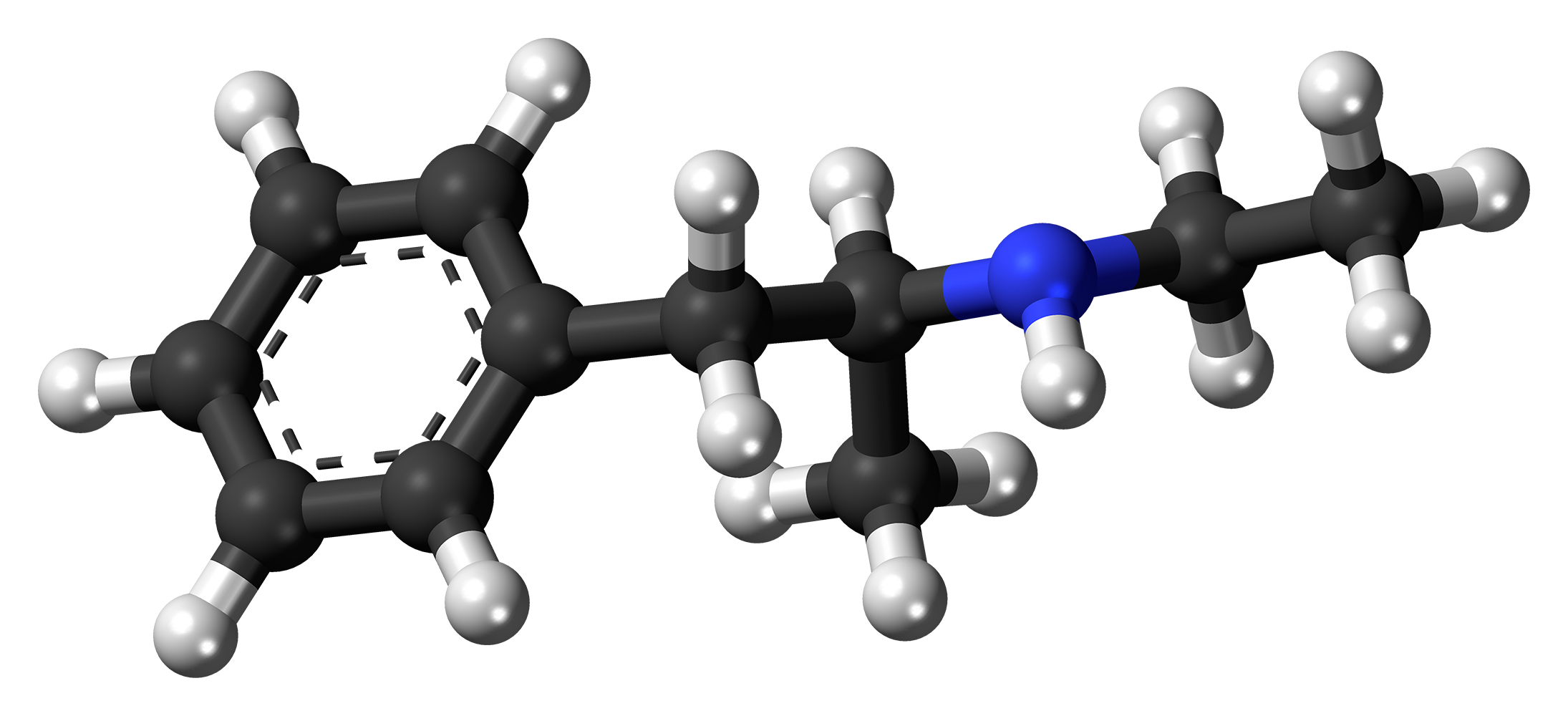

Clinical data
- Trade names: Apetinil; Adiparthrol
- Other names: Etilamfetamine; Ethylamphetamine; N-Ethylamphetamine; PAL-99; PAL99
- Routes of administration: Oral, sublingual, insufflated, inhaled (vaporized), intravenous, rectal
- ATC code: A08AA06 (WHO)

Legal status
- Legal status: BR: Class B1 (Psychoactive drugs); CA: Schedule I; DE: Anlage II (Authorized trade only, not prescriptible); UK: Class C; US: Schedule I

Pharmacokinetic data
- Metabolism: Hepatic (N-dealkylation, others)
- Metabolites: Amphetamine
- Excretion: Urine (5–18% as amphetamine)

Identifiers
- IUPAC name: N-Ethyl-1-phenyl-propan-2-amine
- CAS Number: 457-87-4
- PubChem CID: 9982
- ChemSpider: 9588
- UNII: 022YON1XMX
- KEGG: D07114
- ChEMBL: ChEMBL276443
- CompTox Dashboard (EPA): DTXSID10860359
- ECHA InfoCard: 100.230.711

Chemical and physical data
- Formula: C_{11}H_{17}N
- Molar mass: 163.264 g·mol^{−1}
- 3D model (JSmol): Interactive image
- SMILES: N(C(Cc1ccccc1)C)CC
- InChI: InChI=1S/C11H17N/c1-3-12-10(2)9-11-7-5-4-6-8-11/h4-8,10,12H,3,9H2,1-2H3; Key:YAGBSNMZQKEFCO-UHFFFAOYSA-N

Etilamfetamine, also known as N-ethylamphetamine and formerly sold under the brand names Apetinil and Adiparthrol, is a stimulant drug of the amphetamine family. It was invented in the early 20th century and was subsequently used as an anorectic or appetite suppressant in the 1950s, but was not as commonly used as other amphetamines such as amphetamine, methamphetamine, and benzphetamine, and was largely discontinued once newer drugs such as phenmetrazine were introduced.

== Pharmacology ==
=== Pharmacodynamics ===
==== Monoamine releasing agent ====
Ethylamphetamine is a potent dopamine releasing agent (DRA) in vitro, with an EC_{50} of 88.5 nM. This is about 10-fold lower than the EC_{50} of dextroamphetamine. The EC_{50} values of ethylamphetamine for induction of norepinephrine and serotonin release were not reported. However, the EC_{50} values of its dextrorotatory enantiomer dextroethylamphetamine have been reported and were 28.8 nM, 44.1 nM, and 333 nM for norepinephrine, dopamine, and serotonin, respectively. Hence, dextroethylamphetamine acts as a norepinephrine–dopamine releasing agent (NDRA) with weak effects on serotonin.

In terms of structure–activity relationships, the potency of amphetamines as dopamine releasing agents and reuptake inhibitors decreases with increasing N-alkyl chain length. That is, the order of potency of N-alkylated amphetamines is as follows: amphetamine > methamphetamine > ethylamphetamine > propylamphetamine > butylamphetamine. Propylamphetamine is a weak dopamine reuptake inhibitor rather than releaser, whereas butylamphetamine is completely inactive as a dopamine releaser or reuptake inhibitor. The same relationship, for monoamine release and reuptake inhibition generally, has been shown with 4-methylamphetamine and its N-alkylated derivatives like 4-methylmethamphetamine and so forth.

Monoamine release of ethylamphetamine and related agents (EC_{50}, nM)
Compound	NE	DA	5-HT	Ref
Phenethylamine	10.9	39.5	>10,000	
d-Amphetamine	6.6–10.2	5.8–24.8	698–1,765	
d-Methamphetamine	12.3–14.3	8.5–40.4	736–1,292	
Ethylamphetamine	ND	88.5	ND	
d-Ethylamphetamine	28.8	44.1	333.0	
Propylamphetamine	ND	RI (1,013)	ND	
Butylamphetamine	ND	IA (>10,000)	ND	
Notes: The smaller the value, the more strongly the drug releases the neurotransmitter. The assays were done in rat brain synaptosomes and human potencies may be different. See also Monoamine releasing agent § Activity profiles for a larger table with more compounds. Refs:

==== Other actions ====
Ethylamphetamine is inactive as an agonist of the mouse and human trace amine-associated receptor 1 (TAAR1), whereas findings in the case of the rat TAAR1 are conflicting. In one study, its K_{i} was 2,500 nM and its EC_{50} (E_{max}) was 880 nM (62%) at the rat TAAR1 (i.e., it was a partial agonist), whereas its K_{i} and/or EC_{50} values at the mouse and human TAAR1 were >10,000 nM. In another study however, ethylamphetamine showed very little capacity to activate the rat TAAR1.

=== Pharmacokinetics ===
Ethylamphetamine can be N-dealkylated into amphetamine (5–18% excreted in urine after 24 hours). As such, amphetamine may contribute to its effects in vivo.

==== Metabolism ====
The levorotatory enantiomer and dextrorotatory enantiomers have different metabolism, at least as demonstrated in rabbits; the levorotatory isomer is more frequently subjected to N-oxidation and dealkylation, whereas the dextrorotatory isomer more commonly undergoes deamination. In a racemic mixture of ethylamphetamine, they behave as two distinct substances and compete with each other for enzymes.

A study conducted on rats showed that the organism metabolizes the racemic drug more rapidly and actively into the levorotatory form of ethylamphetamine, resulting in the dextrorotatory form remaining in the urine largely unchanged. Within 24 hours, only about 8.8% of the initial 15 mg/kg dose administered to the rats was excreted unchanged in the urine (the remainder was either biotransformed into other substances or retained in the body). Of this amount, d-enantiomers accounted for 5.81%, while l-enantiomers accounted for 2.95%. In their unchanged form, the dextrorotatory isomer was excreted at a concentration of 3.67%, and the levorotatory isomer at 1.03%. The metabolite amphetamine (levoamphetamine and dextroamphetamine, respectively) was detected at concentrations of 2.14% for the dextrorotatory and 1.92% for the levorotatory form. In a review focusing on humans, it was noted that humans excrete the racemate much more intensively than rats. Although differences in metabolism still exist and vary from person to person, the human body metabolizes d-ethylamphetamine more actively, bypassing l-ethylamphetamine. Total excretion reached 47.46% in one subject and 31.43% in another, with the levorotatory isomer being present in the urine in higher proportions.

== Chemistry ==
The molecular structure of ethylamphetamine is analogous to methamphetamine, with an ethyl group in place of the methyl group. (Note: Amphetamine is a substituted phenethylamine with a methyl group at R^{A} position.) It can also be considered a substituted amphetamine, with an ethyl group on the amphetamine backbone. (Note: The ethyl group of ethylamphetamine is at R^{N} position, hence the name N-ethylamphetamine.) (Note: Ethylamphetamine is structurally similar to N-methylamphetamine (methamphetamine), the ethyl group being replaced in methamphetamine with a methyl group.)

Analogues of ethylamphetamine include amphetamine, methamphetamine, propylamphetamine, isopropylamphetamine, butylamphetamine, fenfluramine (3-trifluoromethyl-N-ethylamphetamine), dimethylamphetamine, and 3-fluoroethamphetamine (3-fluoro-N-ethylamphetamine), among others.

== Society and culture ==
=== Recreational use ===
Ethylamphetamine can be used as a recreational drug and, while its prevalence is less than amphetamine's, it is still encountered as a substance taken for recreational purposes. Ethylamphetamine produces effects similar to amphetamine and methamphetamine, though it is of lower potency.
