= 2,6-Diformylpyridine =

Names
- Preferred IUPAC name Pyridine-2,6-dicarbaldehyde
- Other names 2,6-Pyridinedialdehyde

Identifiers
CAS Number	5431-44-7
3D model (JSmol)	Interactive image
ChemSpider	71798
ECHA InfoCard	100.024.172
EC Number	226-589-6
PubChem CID	79485
UNII	FX6E2354Y8
CompTox Dashboard (EPA)	DTXSID80202681
- InChI: InChI=1S/C7H5NO2/c9-4-6-2-1-3-7(5-10)8-6/h1-5H Key: PMWXGSWIOOVHEQ-UHFFFAOYSA-N
- SMILES: C1=CC(=NC(=C1)C=O)C=O

Properties
Appearance	white solid
Melting point	124 °C (255 °F; 397 K)

Hazards
- GHS labelling
Pictograms	(GHS07: Exclamation mark)
Signal word	Warning
Hazard statements	H315, H319, H335
Precautionary statements	P261, P264, P271, P280, P302+P352, P304+P340, P305+P351+P338, P312, P321, P332+P313, P337+P313, P362, P403+P233, P405, P501
- Except where otherwise noted, data are given for materials in their standard state (at 25 °C [77 °F], 100 kPa). Infobox references

2,6-Diformylpyridine is an organic compound with the formula C_{5}H_{3}N(CHO)_{2}, and typically appears as a solid powder at room temperature. The molecule features formyl groups adjacent to the nitrogen of pyridine. The compound is prepared by oxidation of 2,6-dimethylpyridine.

It condenses with amines to give diiminopyridine ligands, as was demonstrated in Fraser Stoddart's synthesis of molecular Borromean rings. It also finds use in the preparation of metal-coordinated polymer materials.

== Related compounds ==
- 2,6-Diacetylpyridine
- Isophthalaldehyde
