= 2,6-Diisopropylaniline =

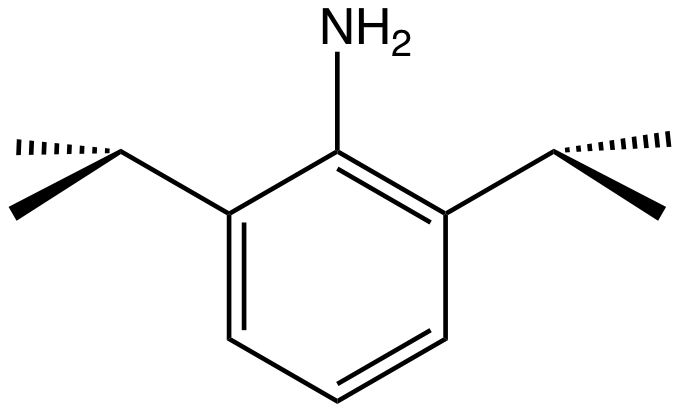

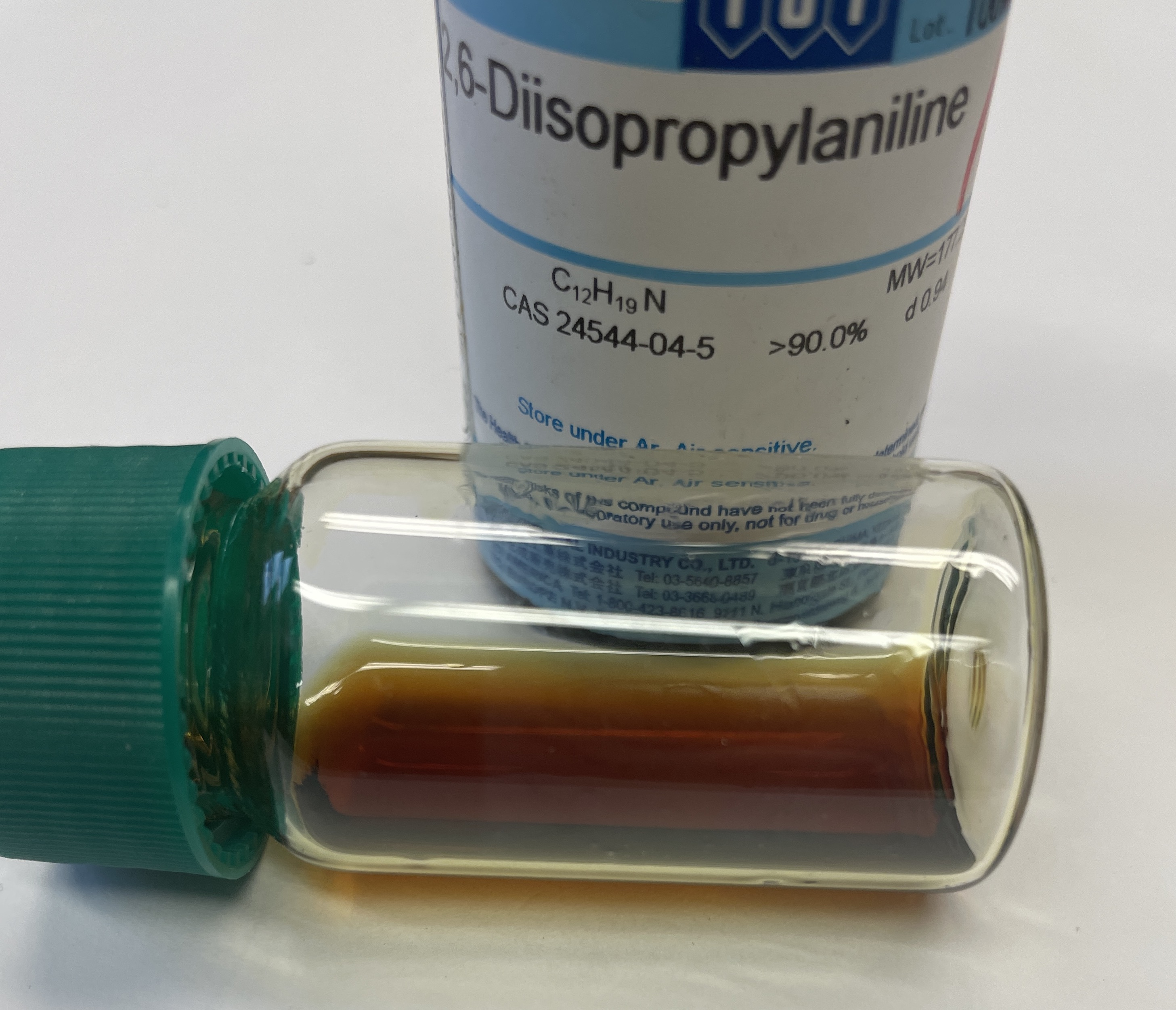

Names
- Preferred IUPAC name 2,6-Di(propan-2-yl)aniline
- Other names 2,6-Diisopropylaniline; 2,6-DIPA

Identifiers
| CAS Number | 24544-04-5 |
| 3D model (JSmol) | Interactive image |
| ChEMBL | ChEMBL3183764 |
| ChemSpider | 13859730 |
| ECHA InfoCard | 100.042.081 |
| EC Number | 246-305-4 |
| PubChem CID | 32484 |
| UNII | 190BG0089I |
| CompTox Dashboard (EPA) | DTXSID5022279 |
- InChI: InChI=1S/C12H19N/c1-8(2)10-6-5-7-11(9(3)4)12(10)13/h5-9H,13H2,1-4H3 Key: WKBALTUBRZPIPZ-UHFFFAOYSA-N
- SMILES: CC(C)C1=C(C(=CC=C1)C(C)C)N

Properties
| Chemical formula | C_{12}H_{19}N |
| Molar mass | 177.291 g·mol^{−1} |
| Appearance | colorless liquid |
| Melting point | −45 °C (−49 °F; 228 K) |
| Boiling point | 257 °C (495 °F; 530 K) |

Hazards
- GHS labelling
| Hazard statements | H412 |
| Precautionary statements | P273, P501 |
- Except where otherwise noted, data are given for materials in their standard state (at 25 °C [77 °F], 100 kPa). Infobox references

2,6-Diisopropylaniline is an organic compound with the formula H_{2}NC_{6}H_{3}(CHMe_{2})_{2} (Me = CH_{3}). It is a colorless liquid although, like many anilines, samples can appear yellow or brown. 2,6-Diisopropylaniline is a bulky aromatic amine that is often used to make ligands in coordination chemistry. The Schrock carbenes often are transition metal imido complexes derived from this aniline. Condensation with diacetylpyridine and acetylacetone gives, respectively, diiminopyridine and NacNac ligands.

Typical Schrock-style olefin metathesis catalysts feature bulky imides as spectator ligands.

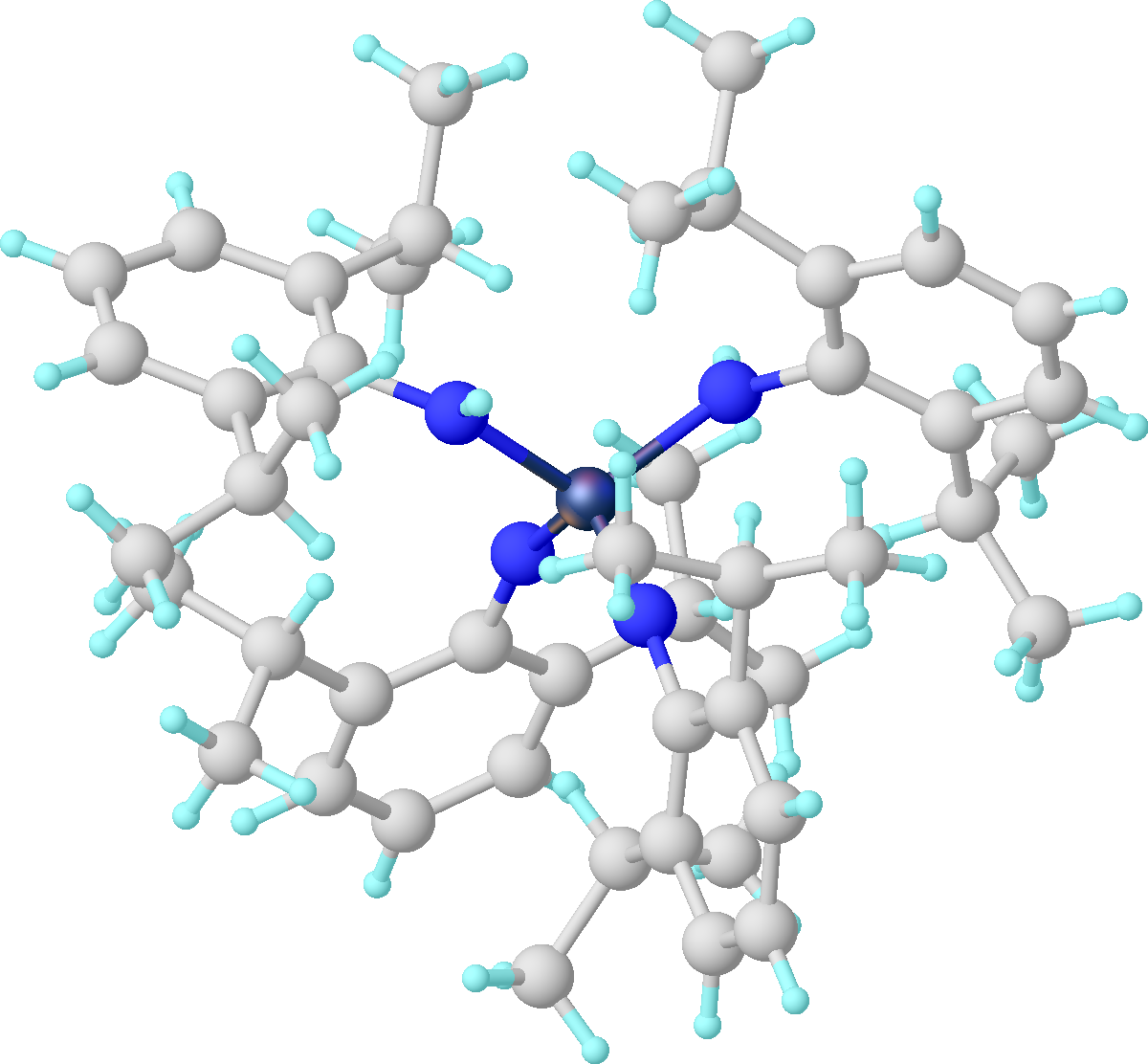
Structure of the diamido-diimido complex W(NAr)_{2}(N(H)Ar)_{2} (ArNH_{2} = 2,6-Diisopropylaniline.
