= Sodium maleonitriledithiolate =

Names
- Preferred IUPAC name Disodium (Z)-1,2-dicyanoethene-1,2-bis(thiolate)
- Other names Sodium mnt sodium maleonitriledithiolate

Identifiers
CAS Number	5466-54-6
3D model (JSmol)	Interactive image
ChemSpider	5013443
PubChem CID	6523934
CompTox Dashboard (EPA)	DTXSID601027241
- InChI: InChI=1S/C4H2N2S2.2Na/c5-1-3(7)4(8)2-6;;/h7-8H;;/q;2*+1/p-2/b4-3+;; Key: UIEQIOFOWZBELJ-CZEFNJPISA-L; InChI=1/C4H2N2S2.2Na/c5-1-3(7)4(8)2-6;;/h7-8H;;/q;2*+1/p-2/b4-3+;; Key: UIEQIOFOWZBELJ-YWCBZGCUBZ
- SMILES: [Na+].[Na+].[S-]/C(C#N)=C(/[S-])C#N

Properties
Chemical formula	C_{4}N_{2}Na_{2}S_{2}
Molar mass	186.16 g·mol^{−1}
Appearance	yellow solid
Solubility in ethanol, DMF	Soluble
- Except where otherwise noted, data are given for materials in their standard state (at 25 °C [77 °F], 100 kPa). verify (what is ?) Infobox references

Sodium maleonitriledithiolate is the chemical compound described by the formula Na_{2}S_{2}C_{2}(CN)_{2}. The name refers to the cis compound, structurally related to maleonitrile ((CH(CN))_{2}). Maleonitriledithiolate is often abbreviated mnt. It is a "dithiolene", i.e. a chelating alkene-1,2-dithiolate. It is a prototypical non-innocent ligand in coordination chemistry. Several complexes are known, such as Ni(mnt)_{2}]^{2−}.

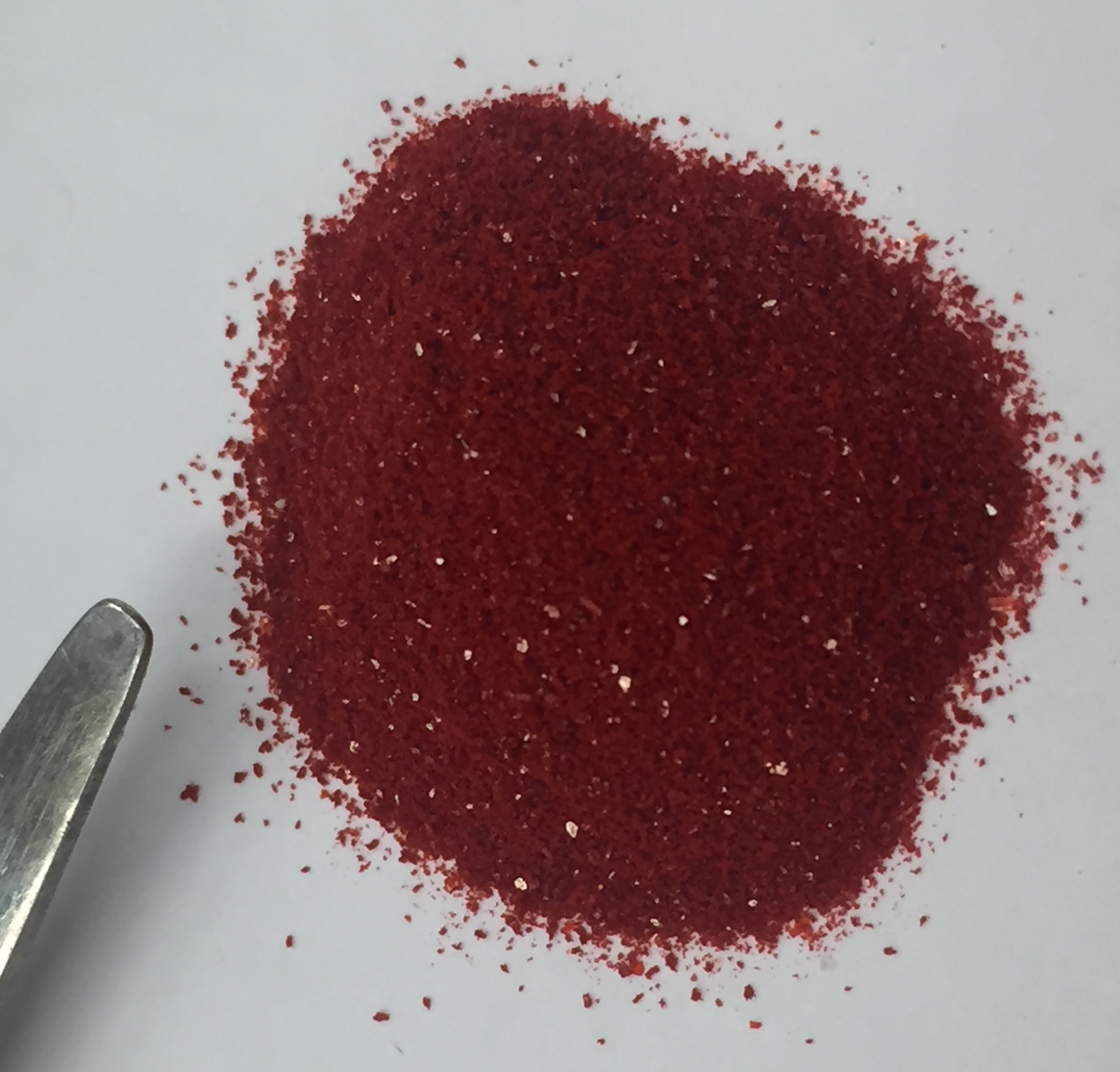
Sample of ([(CH_{3}CH_{2})_{4}N]^{+})_{2}[Ni(mnt)_{2}]^{2−}.

The salt is synthesized by treating carbon disulfide with sodium cyanide to give the cyanodithioformate salt, which eliminates elemental sulfur in aqueous solution:

8 NaCN + 8 CS_{2} → 4 Na_{2}S_{2}C_{2}(CN)_{2} + S_{8}

The compound was first described in 1958.
