= Butylamphetamine =

Amphetamine derivative and stimulant

Clinical data
- Other names: N-Butylamphetamine; N-(n-Butyl)amphetamine; NBA; PAL-90; 1-Phenyl-2-butylaminopropane; N-Butyl-α-methylphenethylamine

Identifiers
- IUPAC name: N-(1-phenylpropan-2-yl)butan-1-amine
- CAS Number: 51799-33-8
- PubChem CID: 94547
- ChemSpider: 85320
- ChEMBL: ChEMBL1907545
- CompTox Dashboard (EPA): DTXSID801024079

Chemical and physical data
- Formula: C_{13}H_{21}N
- Molar mass: 191.318 g·mol^{−1}
- 3D model (JSmol): Interactive image
- SMILES: CCCCNC(C)CC1=CC=CC=C1
- InChI: InChI=1S/C13H21N/c1-3-4-10-14-12(2)11-13-8-6-5-7-9-13/h5-9,12,14H,3-4,10-11H2,1-2H3; Key:VIAVBPFRYASSKF-UHFFFAOYSA-N

Butylamphetamine (code name PAL-90; also known as N-butylamphetamine or NBA) is a psychostimulant of the substituted amphetamine family which was never marketed.

It is the N-butyl analogue of amphetamine and is approximately 6-fold less potent than amphetamine in rats. The drug has been found to be inactive as a dopamine reuptake inhibitor or releasing agent (IC_{50} and EC_{50} > 10,000 nM, respectively). With regard to structure–activity relationships, the potency of N-substituted amphetamine derivatives decreases with increasing chain length in terms of both in vitro and in vivo activity.

Monoamine release of butylamphetamine and related agents (EC_{50}, nM)
Compound	NE	DA	5-HT	Ref
Phenethylamine	10.9	39.5	>10,000	
d-Amphetamine	6.6–10.2	5.8–24.8	698–1,765	
d-Methamphetamine	12.3–14.3	8.5–40.4	736–1,292	
Ethylamphetamine	ND	88.5	ND	
d-Ethylamphetamine	28.8	44.1	333.0	
Propylamphetamine	ND	RI (1,013)	ND	
Butylamphetamine	ND	IA (>10,000)	ND	
Notes: The smaller the value, the more strongly the drug releases the neurotransmitter. The assays were done in rat brain synaptosomes and human potencies may be different. See also Monoamine releasing agent § Activity profiles for a larger table with more compounds. Refs:

The pharmacokinetics of butylamphetamine have been studied in humans. It can be metabolized by CYP2D6 via ring hydroxylation similarly to amphetamine. In addition, butylamphetamine can be N-dealkylated into amphetamine (6–9% excreted in urine after 24 hours).

== See also ==
- Methamphetamine
- Ethylamphetamine
- Propylamphetamine
- Isopropylamphetamine
