= Electromerism =

Electromerism is a type of isomerism between a pair of molecules (electromers, electro-isomers) differing in the way electrons are distributed among the atoms and the connecting chemical bonds. In some literature electromerism is equated to valence tautomerism, a term usually reserved for tautomerism involving reconnecting chemical bonds.

One group of electromers are excited electronic states, but isomerism is usually limited to ground state molecules. Another group of electromers are also called redox isomers: metal ions that can exchange their oxidation state with their ligands (see non-innocent ligand). One of the first instances involved a cobalt(II)-quinone complex vs the related cobalt(III)-semiquinone species. Some metalloporphyrins exist as electromers. as well as a set without a metal.
