= Dithiete =

- Kekulé, skeletal formula of dithiete with all explicit hydrogens added

Names
- Preferred IUPAC name 1,2-Dithiete
- Systematic IUPAC name 1,2-Dithiacyclobut-3-ene
- Other names Dithiete; Dithiacyclobutene; 1,2-Dithia[4]annulene

Identifiers
CAS Number	7092-01-5
3D model (JSmol)	Interactive image; Interactive image
ChemSpider	122516
PubChem CID	138918
CompTox Dashboard (EPA)	DTXSID70221149
- InChI: InChI=1S/C2H2S2/c1-2-4-3-1/h1-2H Key: CTGHONDBXRRMRC-UHFFFAOYSA-N
- SMILES: c1css1; S1SC=C1

Properties
Chemical formula	C_{2}H_{2}S_{2}
Molar mass	90.16 g·mol^{−1}

Related compounds
Related thietes	Thiete
Related compounds	Thiirene; 2,3-Dihydrothiophene; Thiophene
- Except where otherwise noted, data are given for materials in their standard state (at 25 °C [77 °F], 100 kPa). Infobox references

Dithiete is an unsaturated heterocyclic compound that contains two adjacent sulfur atoms and two sp^{2}-hybridized carbon centers. Derivatives are known collectively as dithietes or 1,2-dithietes. With 6 π electrons, 1,2-dithietes are examples of aromatic organosulfur compounds. A few 1,2-dithietes have been isolated; one (low-yielding) route is oxidation of a dithiolene complex.

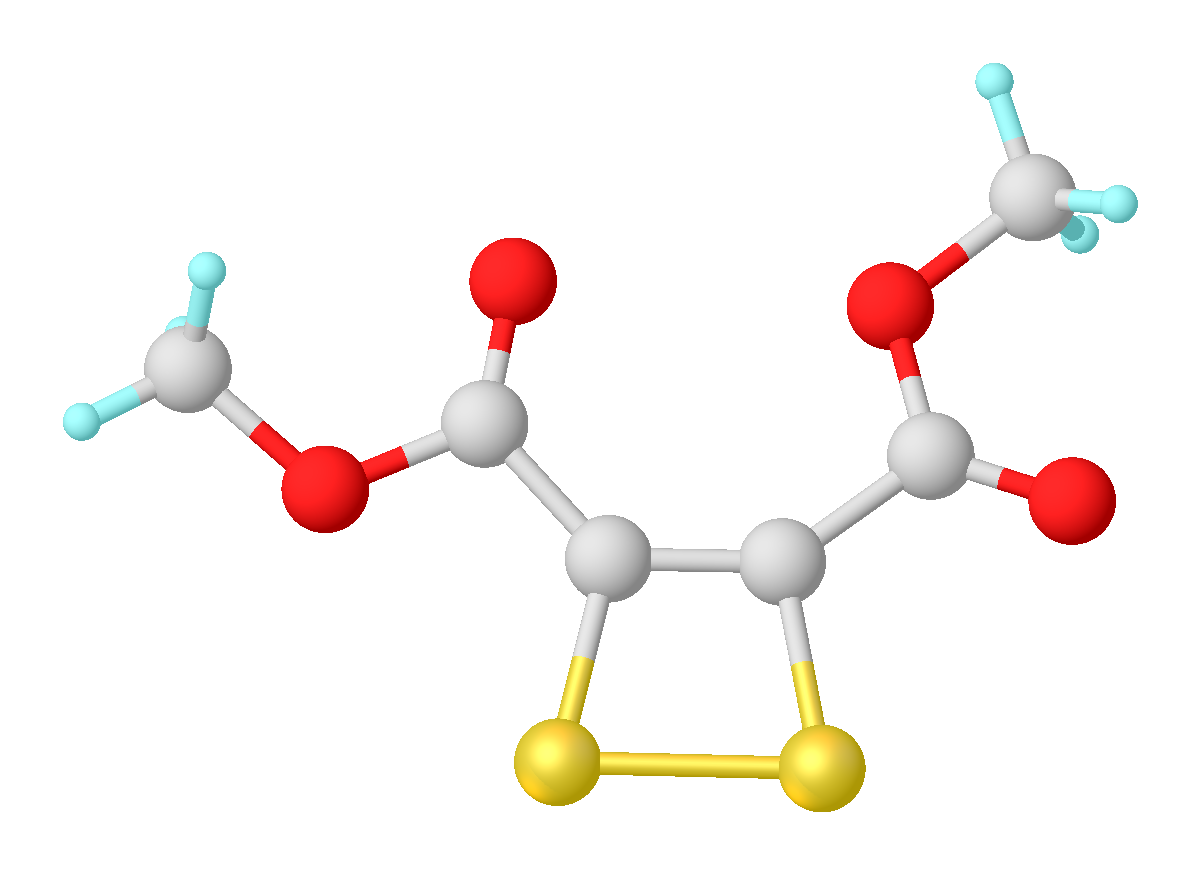
Structure of the dithiete S_{2}C_{2}(CO_{2}Me)_{2}. Selected distances and angles: r_{C=C} = 1.362, r_{C-S} = 1.738, r_{S-S} = 2.072 Å, <_{S-S-C} = 78.3°, <_{S-C-S} = 102°.

Computation suggests that electron-donating substituents tend to promote isomerization to the vicinal dithione, and conversely electron-withdrawing substituents stabilize the dithiete. 3,4-Bis(trifluoromethyl)-1,2-dithiete is a particularly stable example, arising from boiling the corresponding alkyne in sulfur. Empirically, bulky neighboring groups, even when electron-donating also force the equilibrium towards the dithiete conformer. Absent either of these effects, "most of the 1,2-dithietes are highly reactive and elude isolation at room temperature."

Ring opening is facile, even with stabilized dithietes, and occurs in many reactions. For example 3,4-bis(trifluoromethyl)-1,2-dithiete undergoes a hetero-Diels-Alder reaction with tetramethylethylene, indicating that a diene (thione) form must be the active intermediate. Metals and trivalent phosphorus derivatives insert into the ring/reduce the dithione tautomer to give metal dithiolene complexes.

Unsubstituted 1,2-dithiete has been generated in thermolytic reactions and was characterized by microwave spectroscopy, ultraviolet photoelectron spectroscopy and infrared spectroscopy in a low temperature matrix. The open ring isomer, dithioglyoxal, HC(S)C(S)H, is less stable than the 1,2-dithiete. The dithione can be prepared (as trans-dithioglyoxal) by low temperature photolysis of 1,3-dithiol-2-one. Quantum chemical calculations reproduce the observed greater stability of 1,2-dithiete only if large basis-sets with polarization functions are used.

== See also ==
- Dithietane - the corresponding saturated ring
- Thiete - an analogue with only one sulfur atom

== Additional reading ==
- Diehl, F.; Meyer, H.; Schweig, A.; Hess, B. A.; Fabian, J. (September 1989). "1,2-Dithiete is more stable than 1,2-dithioglyoxal as evidenced by a combined experimental and theoretical IR spectroscopic approach". J. Am. Chem. Soc. 111 (19): 7651–7653. Bibcode:1989JAChS.111.7651D. doi:10.1021/ja00201a076.
- Vijay, D; Priyakumar, UD; Sastry, GN (2004). "Basis set and method dependence of the relative energies of C_{2}S_{2}H_{2} isomers". Chemical Physics Letters. 383 (1–2): 192–197. Bibcode:2004CPL...383..192V. doi:10.1016/j.cplett.2003.11.021.
- Jonas, V; Frenking, G (1991). "On the crucial importance of polarization functions for the calculation of molecules with third-row elements: the conformations of chlorocarbonyl isocyanate ClC(O)NCO and the equilibrium of 1,2-dithioglyoxal with its cyclic isomer 1,2-dithiete". Chemical Physics Letters. 177 (2): 175–183. Bibcode:1991CPL...177..175J. doi:10.1016/0009-2614(91)90064-G.
- Gonzalez, L; Mo, O; Yanez, M (13 December 1996). "High-level ab initio calculations on the 1,2-dithioglyoxal/1,2-dithiete isomerism". Chemical Physics Letters. 263 (3): 407–413(7). Bibcode:1996CPL...263..407G. doi:10.1016/S0009-2614(96)01240-7.
