= 1,2-Dithietane =

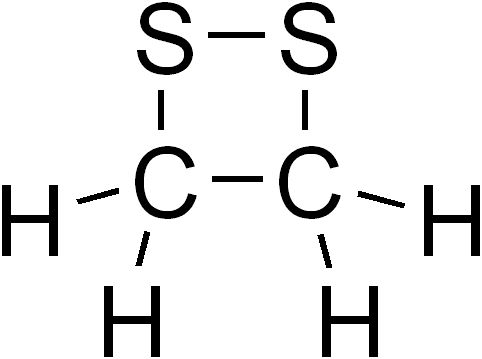

Names
- Preferred IUPAC name 1,2-Dithietane
- Systematic IUPAC name 1,2-Dithiacyclobutane

Identifiers
3D model (JSmol)	Interactive image
ChemSpider	11270017
PubChem CID	12309283
CompTox Dashboard (EPA)	DTXSID101028620
- InChI: InChI=1S/C2H4S2/c1-2-4-3-1/h1-2H2 Key: UPNNXUSUOSTIIM-UHFFFAOYSA-N; InChI=1/C2H4S2/c1-2-4-3-1/h1-2H2 Key: UPNNXUSUOSTIIM-UHFFFAOYAY
- SMILES: C1CSS1

Properties
Chemical formula	C_{2}H_{4}S_{2}
Molar mass	92.18 g/mol

Related compounds
Related compounds	Dithiete, Dioxetane, 1,2-Dithiadistannetane
- Except where otherwise noted, data are given for materials in their standard state (at 25 °C [77 °F], 100 kPa). verify (what is ?) Infobox references

1,2-Dithietane is a dithietane. It is a heterocyclic compound with a four-membered ring. Two sulfur atoms are adjacent, and the molecule is saturated. 1,2-Dithietane has not been produced as of 2000. The combination of ring strain, and lone pairs of electrons, which repel each other, on the sulfur atoms makes the sulfur-sulfur bond too weak to produce the molecule. However a few derivatives are known. 3,4-Diethyl-1,2-dithietane 1,1-dioxide has one sulfur fully oxidised. Dithiatopazine is a tricyclic compound with the -S-S- as a bridge. 1,2-Dithietan-3-one, the ketone of 1,2-dithietane, was produced in 2008 by reacting α-dithiolactone with ethoxycarbonylformonitrile oxide. 4,4-di-tert-butyl-1,2-dithietan-3-one and the spiro compound 5,5,9,9-tetramethyl-1,2-dithiaspiro[3.5]nonan-3-one have also been made.

1,2-Dithietane was claimed to have been made by reacting 1,2-ethanedithiol with iodine, but the major product was an eight-membered ring.

A reaction of 2,3-dimercapto-1-propanol with 3-methyllumiflavin transiently produced 3-hydroxy-1,2-dithietane. This dithietane polymerised under light, breaking and reforming the S-S bonds to form a long chain -SSCH(OH)CH_{2}-.
