= Metal dithiolene complex =

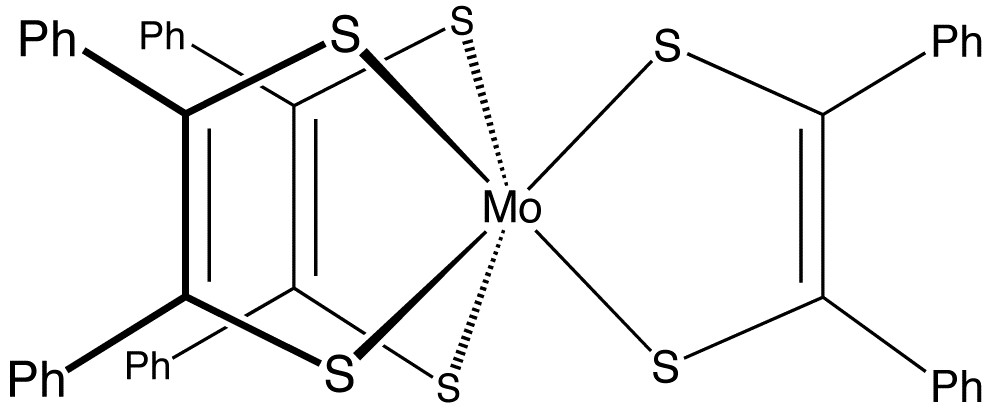
Structure of Mo(S_{2}C_{2}Ph_{2})_{3}

Dithiolene metal complexes are complexes containing 1,2-dithiolene ligands. 1,2-Dithiolene ligands, a particular case of 1,2-dichalcogenolene species along with 1,2-diselenolene derivatives, are unsaturated bidentate ligand wherein the two donor atoms are sulfur. 1,2-Dithiolene metal complexes are often referred to as "metal dithiolenes", "metallodithiolenes" or "dithiolene complexes". Most molybdenum- and tungsten-containing proteins have dithiolene-like moieties at their active sites, which feature the so-called molybdopterin cofactor bound to the Mo or W.

Dithiolene metal complexes have been studied since the 1960s when they were first popularized by Gerhard N. Schrauzer and Volker P. Mayweg, who prepared nickel bis(stilbene-1,2-dithiolate) (Ni(S_{2}C_{2}Ph_{2})_{2}) by the reaction of nickel sulfide and diphenylacetylene. The structural, spectroscopic, and electrochemical properties of many related complexes have been described.

== Structure ==
Dithiolene metal complexes can be found in coordination compounds where the metal centre is coordinated by one, two, or three dithiolene ligands. The tris(dithiolene) complexes were the first examples of trigonal prismatic geometry in coordination chemistry. One example is Mo(S_{2}C_{2}Ph_{2})_{3}. Similar structures have been observed for several other metals.

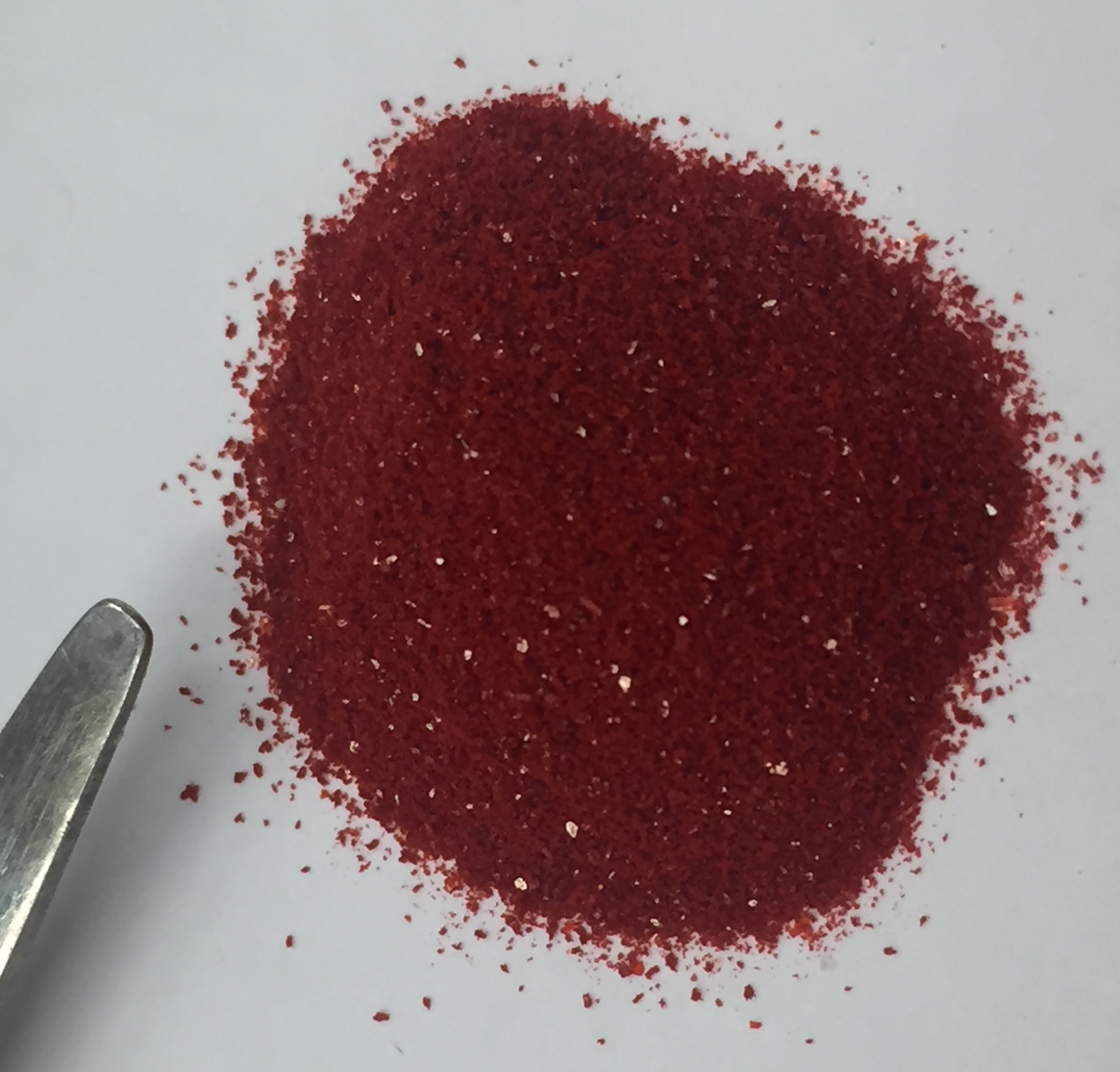
Sample of (Et_{4}N)_{2}Ni(mnt)_{2}, illustrating the intense color that typifies many dithiolene complexes

Because of the unusual redox and intense optical properties of dithiolenes, the electronic structure of dithiolene complexes has been the subject of intense studies. 1,2-Dithiolene ligands can exist in three oxidation states: the dianionic "ene-1,2-dithiolate", the neutral "1,2-dithioketone," and a monoanionic radical intermediate between these two. When the latter two are complexed to a metal centre, the oxidation state of the ligand (and therefore the metal centre) cannot be easily defined. Such ligands are therefore referred to as non-innocent. The substituents on the backbone of the dithiolene ligand, R and R′, affect the properties of the resulting metal complex in the expected way. Long chains confer solubility in less polar solvents. Electron acceptors (e.g. cyanide CN^{−}, acetate CH_{3}CO^{−}_{2}) stabilize reduced and anionic complexes. Derivatives are known where the substituents are the same, symmetrical dithiolenes (R = R′) are more common than unsymmetrical.

Due to their delocalized electronic structure, 1,2-dithiolene complexes undergo reversible redox reaction. When oxidized, dithiolene complexes have greater 1,2-dithioketone character. In reduced complexes, the ligand assumes more ene-1,2-dithiolate character. These descriptions are evaluated by examination of differences in C–C and C–S bond distances. The true structure lies somewhere between these resonance structures. Reflecting the impossibility to provide an unequivocal description of the structure, McCleverty introduced the term 'dithiolene' to give a general name for the ligand that does not specify a particular oxidation state. This suggestion was generally accepted, and 'dithiolene' is now a universally accepted term. Only more recently the radical nature of monoanionic 1,2-dithiolene ligands has been pointed out. While few examples of authentic dithiolene radicals have been reported, diamagnetism in neutral bis(1,2-dithiolene) complexes of divalent transition metal ions should be considered as a consequence of a string antiferromagnetic coupling between the two radical ligands.

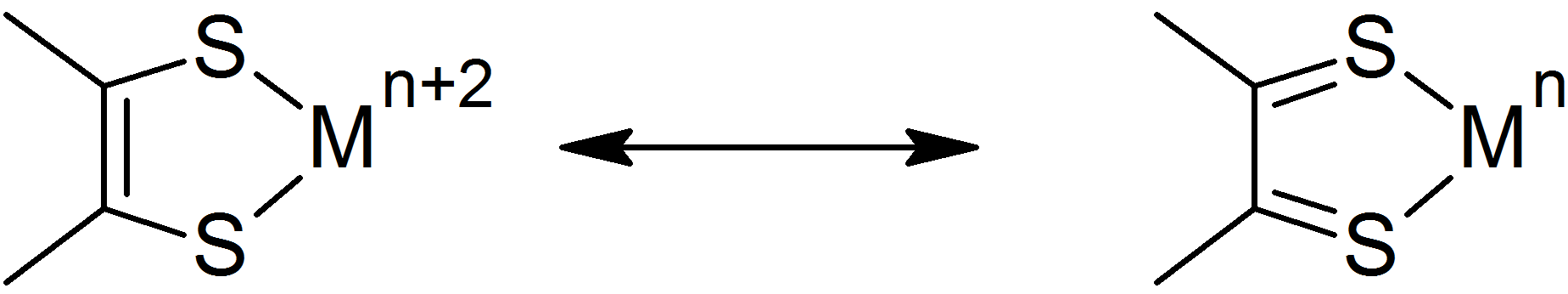
Limiting resonance structures of a C_{2}S_{2}M ring in a R_{2}C_{2}S_{2}M compounds, where R stands typically for H, CN or organyl.

== Applications and occurrence ==
1,2-Dithiolene metal complexes occur widely in nature in the form of the molybdopterin-bound Mo and W-containing enzymes.

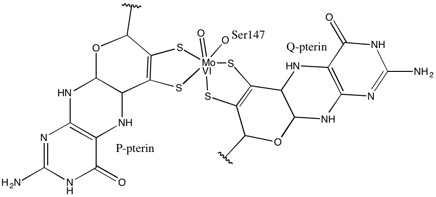
Active site of the enzyme DMSO reductase features two pyranopterindithiolene ligands.

1,2-Dithiolene complexes applications are numerous, and span from superconductivity, to linear and non linear optics, to biochemistry. Commercial applications of 1,2-dithiolene complexes are limited. A few dithiolene complexes have been commercialized as dyes in laser applications (Q-switching, mode-locking). 1,2-Dithiolene complexes have been discussed in the context of conductivity, magnetism, and nonlinear optics. It was proposed to use dithiolene metal complexes that bind unsaturated hydrocarbons at the sulfur centers for industrial olefin (alkene) purifications. However, the complexities within such systems became later apparent, and it was argued that more research would be needed before using metal dithiolene complexes in alkene purifications may become practical.

== Preparation ==
=== From alkenedithiolates ===
Most dithiolene complexes are prepared by reaction of alkali metal salts of 1,2-alkenedithiolates with metal halides. A thiolate is the conjugate base of a thiol, so alkenedithiolate is, formally speaking, the conjugate base of an alkenedithiol. Common alkenedithiolates are 1,3-dithiole-2-thione-4,5-dithiolate and maleonitriledithiolate (mnt^{2−}):

Ni^{2+} + 2 (NC)_{2}C_{2}S^{2−}_{2} → Ni[S_{2}C_{2}(CN)_{2}]^{2−}_{2}

Some alkenedithiolates are generated in situ, often by complex organic reactions:

cis-H_{2}C_{2}(SCH_{2}Ph)_{2} + 4 Na → cis-H_{2}C_{2}(SNa)_{2} + 2 NaCH_{2}Ph

Once generated, these anions are deployed as ligands:

NiCl_{2} + 2 cis-H_{2}C_{2}(SNa)_{2} → Na_{2}[Ni(S_{2}C_{2}H_{2})_{2}] + 2 NaCl

Often the initially formed, electron-rich complex undergoes spontaneous air-oxidation:

2 [Ni(S_{2}C_{2}H_{2})_{2}]^{2−} + 4 H^{+} + O_{2} → 2 Ni(S_{2}C_{2}H_{2})_{2} + 2 H_{2}O

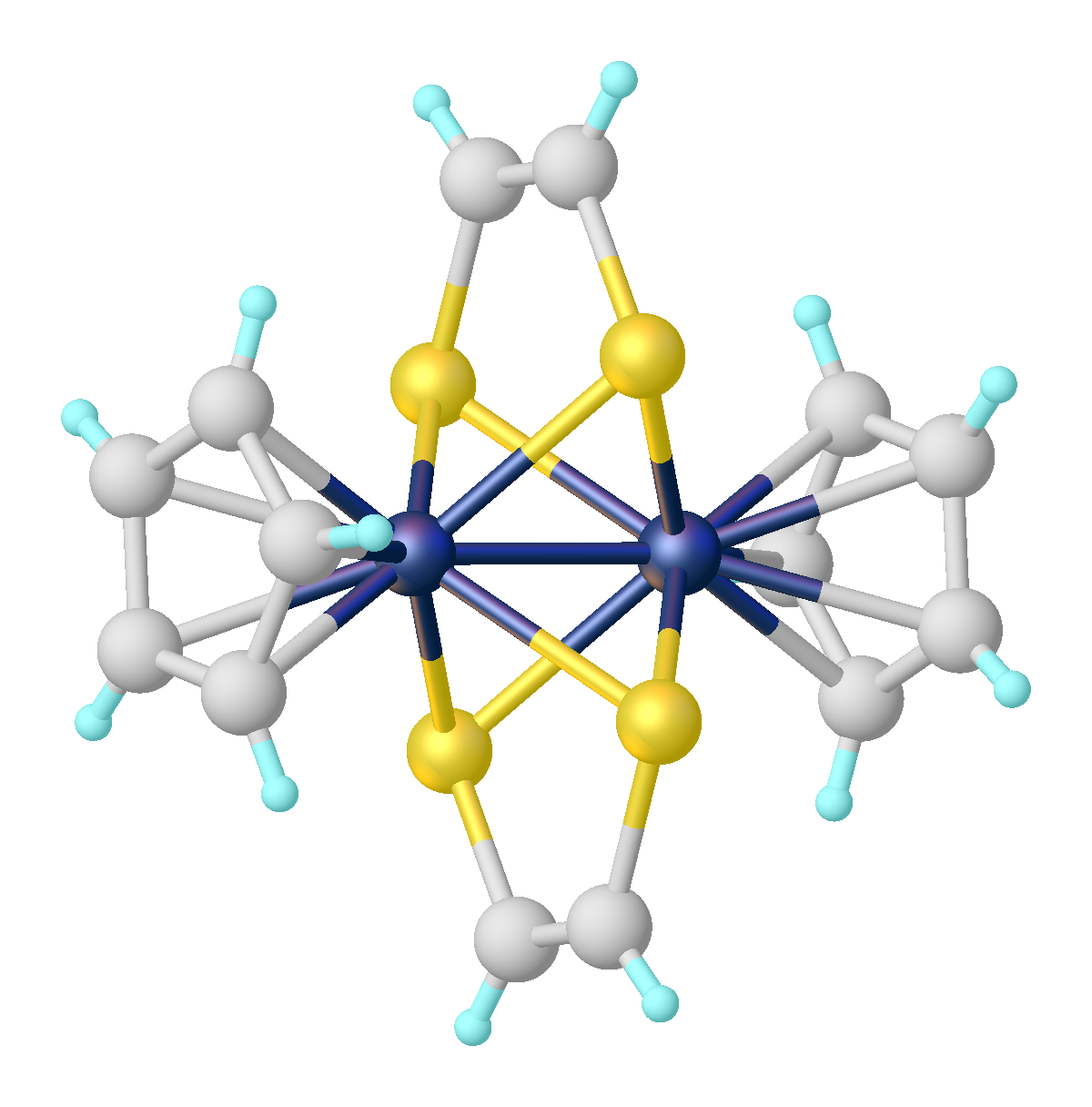
Structure of (C_{5}H_{5})_{2}Mo_{2}(S_{2}C_{2}H_{2})_{2}, featuring a bridging dithiolene ligand. It was prepared by the addition of acetylene to (C_{5}H_{5})_{2}Mo_{2}S_{4}.

=== From acyloins ===
An early and still powerful method for the synthesis of dithiolenes entails the reaction of α-hydroxyketones, acyloins, with P_{4}S_{10} followed by hydrolysis and treatment of the mixture with metal salts. This method is used to prepare Ni[S_{2}C_{2}Ar_{2}]_{2} (Ar = aryl).

=== From dithietes ===
Although 1,2-dithiones are rare and thus not useful precursors, their valence isomer, the 1,2-dithietes are occasionally used. One of the more common dithiete is the distillable (CF_{3})_{2}C_{2}S_{2}. This electrophilic reagent oxidatively adds to many low valent metals to give bis- and tris(dithiolene) complexes.

Mo(CO)_{6} + 3 (CF_{3})_{2}C_{2}S_{2} → [(CF_{3})_{2}C_{2}S_{2}]_{3}Mo + 6 CO
Ni(CO)_{4} + 2 (CF_{3})_{2}C_{2}S_{2} → [(CF_{3})_{2}C_{2}S_{2}]_{2}Ni + 4 CO

=== By reactions of metal sulfides with alkynes ===
Species of the type Ni[S_{2}C_{2}Ar_{2}]_{2} were first prepared by reactions of nickel sulfides with diphenylacetylene. More modern versions of this method entail the reaction of electrophilic acetylenes such as dimethyl acetylenedicarboxylate with well defined polysulfido complexes.

== History and nomenclature ==
Early studies on dithiolene ligands, although not called by that name until the 1960s, focused on the quinoxaline-2,3-dithiolates and 3,4-toluenedithiolates, which form brightly colored precipitates with several metal centres. Such species were originally of interest in analytical chemistry. Dithiolenes lacking benzene backbones represented an important development of the area, especially maleonitrile-1,2-dithiolate ("mnt"), (NC)_{2}C_{2}S^{2−}_{2}, and ethylenedithiolene, H_{2}C_{2}S^{2−}_{2}.
