= 3,4-Bis(trifluoromethyl)-1,2-dithiete =

Names
- Preferred IUPAC name Bis(trifluoromethyl)-1,2-dithiete

Identifiers
CAS Number	360-91-8
3D model (JSmol)	Interactive image
ChemSpider	119970
PubChem CID	136194
CompTox Dashboard (EPA)	DTXSID60189562
- InChI: InChI=1S/C4F6S2/c5-3(6,7)1-2(12-11-1)4(8,9)10 Key: YSIXKKRCABXBLQ-UHFFFAOYSA-N
- SMILES: C1(=C(SS1)C(F)(F)F)C(F)(F)F

Properties
Chemical formula	C_{4}F_{6}S_{2}
Molar mass	226.15 g·mol^{−1}
Appearance	yellow liquid
Boiling point	96 °C (205 °F; 369 K)
- Except where otherwise noted, data are given for materials in their standard state (at 25 °C [77 °F], 100 kPa). Infobox references

3,4-Bis(trifluoromethyl)-1,2-dithiete is the organofluorine compound with the formula (CF_{3})_{2}C_{2}S_{2}, a yellow liquid. It is a stable 1,2-dithiete. It arises by the reaction of hexafluoro-2-butyne with molten sulfur.

== Bonding ==
Being planar with six pi-electrons, the compound is considered to be aromatic. This description is supported by an electron diffraction study, which reveals an elongated C=C distance of 1.40 Å and shortened C-S distances of 1.73 Å.

== Reactions ==
The compound tends to dimerize at room temperature, but the dimer cracks at higher temperature back to the dithiete. It is used to prepare metal dithiolene complexes. It reacts with low valent metal complexes by oxidative addition:

Ni(CO)_{4} + 2 (CF_{3})_{2}C_{2}S_{2} → Ni(S_{2}C_{2}(CF_{3})_{2})_{2} + 4 CO
Mo(CO)_{6} + 3 (CF_{3})_{2}C_{2}S_{2} → Mo(S_{2}C_{2}(CF_{3})_{2})_{3} + 6 CO
