= Diiminopyridine =

Class of chemical compounds

Diiminopyridines (DIP, also known a pyridine diimines, PDIs) are a class of diimine ligands. They featuring a pyridine nucleus with imine sidearms appended to the 2,6–positions. The three nitrogen centres bind metals in a tridentate fashion, forming pincer complexes. Diiminopyridines are notable as non-innocent ligand that can assume more than one oxidation state. Complexes of DIPs participate in a range of chemical reactions, including ethylene polymerization, hydrosilylation, and hydrogenation.

== Synthesis and properties of DIP ligands ==
Many DIPs have been prepared. They are synthesized by Schiff base condensation of commercially available 2,6-diacetylpyridine or 2,6-diformylpyridine with two equivalents of substituted anilines. Using substituted anilines, complexes one can obtain DIPs with diverse steric environments. Commonly used bulky anilines are 2,4,6-trimethylaniline and 2,6-diisopropylaniline. Unsymmetric variations have been established by successive condensation of different anilines. The dicarbonyl portion of the backbone can be further modified, as with 2,6-dipyridecarboxaldehyde and 2,6-dibenzoylpyridine. Most commonly, variations in the DIP arise from changes in the anilines.

Synthesis of diiminopyridine complexes

=== Effect of steric bulk ===
Depending on its steric bulk, DIP ligands form complexes of 2:1 and 1:1 ratios, M(DIP)L_{x} and M(DIP)_{2}, respectively. The 2:1 complexes occur for unhindered DIP ligands. Although such complexes are coordinatively saturated, they have been studied for their electronic and structural properties. Formation of 2:1 complexation is suppressed with bulky DIP ligands. Complexes of the type M(DIP)L_{n} exhibit diverse reactivity.

== Fe and Co complexes ==
The reduction of the Fe(II)(DIP)X_{2} with sodium amalgam under nitrogen yields a square-pyramidal bis(nitrogen) complex Fe(II)(DIP)(N_{2})_{2}. This complex is a precursor to other derivatives by exchange of the dinitrogen ligands, e.g. with H_{2} and CO, to give the monohydrogen or dicarbonyl complexes. Arylazides give imido complexes. Fe(DIP)(N_{2})_{2} is a precursor to highly active catalysts for hydrosilylation and hydrogenation reactions. Dissociation of N_{2} from Fe(DIP)(N_{2})_{2} results in binding of the anilino arene in an η^{6}-fashion. This binding mode may play a role in the catalytic hydrogenation cycle.

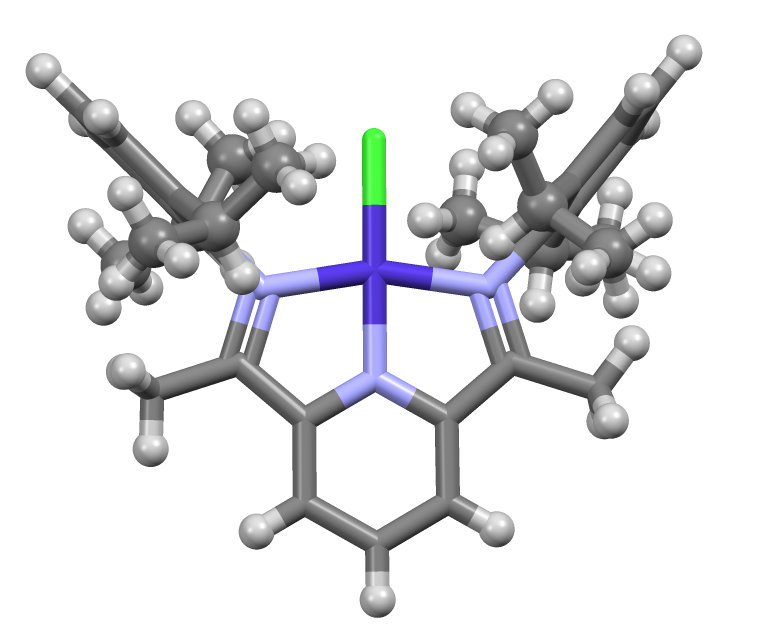
Structure of Co(DIP)Cl where DIP = C_{5}H_{3}N-2,6-(C(NAr)Me)_{2} (Ar = 2,6-diisopropylphenyl) derived from diacetylpyridine and 2,6-diisopropylaniline).

The reactivity of cobalt- and iron-DIP complexes are similar. Cobalt DIP complexes with azide ligands have been shown to lose N_{2} to give reactive nitrido complexes that undergo C-H activation of benzylic sites of the aryl substituents. The resulting cyclometalated amide adopt a roughly planar geometry.

== Noninnocence of DIP complexes ==
The highly conjugated ligand framework of bis(imino)pyridine stabilizes metals in unusual oxidation states. The ability of the neutral complex to accept up to three electrons leads to ambiguity about the oxidation states of the metal center. The complex Fe(DIP)(N_{2})_{2} complex is ostensibly a 18e complex, consisting of Fe(0) with five 2-electron ligands. Mössbauer spectroscopy indicates, however, that this complex is better described as a ferrous derivative of DIP^{2−}. This assignment is corroborated by the high frequency of the ν_{NN} vibration in the infrared spectrum, which is more consistent with Fe(II). Thus, reduction of Fe(DIP)Br_{2} is ligand-centered, not Fe-centered.

This non-innocent behavior allows iron-DIP complexes to participate in 2e redox reactions, which is a pattern more usually seen for complexes of platinum group metals.

== Catalytic reactions of M-DIP complexes ==
The catalytic properties of DIP complexes of Fe, Co, and Ni have attracted much attention. In principle, catalyst derived from "base metals" are preferred to noble transition metal catalysis due to low environmental impact and cost effectiveness. Furthermore, owing to its modular synthesis, the DIP ligand is easily modifiable allowing diversity in ligand screening. Complexes of the type M(DIP)X_{n} serve as precatalysts for ethylene polymerization. The precatalysts are activated by treatment with methylaluminoxane (MAO), which serves as a co-catalyst. Activities for 2,6-bis(imino)pyridine iron complexes are often comparable to or greater than group 4 metallocenes. The aryl substituents greatly affect the products. Small aryl substituents allow for highly selective production of oligomeric α-olefins, whereas bulky groups provide strictly linear, high molecular weight polyethylene. Silica-supported and homogeneous catalysts have been reported.

Traditionally catalyzed by Pt and other precious metals, hydrosilylation is also catalyzed by Fe-DIP complexes. Reactions proceed under mild conditions, show anti-Markovnikov selectivity, and tolerate diverse functional groups. Depending on the steric properties of the ligand, Fe-DIP complexes catalyze hydrogenation of terminal olefins.

== Variations of DIP ligands ==
In N-heterocyclic carbene variations of the diiminopyridine complex, the pyridine or imine substituents is replaced with an NHC group. The aryl substituted bis(imino)NHC complexes produce tridentate ligands, while the pyridine exchanged NHC forms exclusively bidentate complexes. This is presumably due to the additional strain from the 5 member ring of the central carbene.
