= Desaurin =

2,4-Dimethylidene-1,3-dithietane

Names
- IUPAC name 2,4-dimethylidene-1,3-dithietane

Identifiers
3D model (JSmol)	parent: Interactive image
PubChem CID	parent: 129652735
- InChI: parent: InChI=1S/C4H4S2/c1-3-5-4(2)6-3/h1-2H2 Key: QWWVTCYHWDEKBZ-UHFFFAOYSA-N
- SMILES: parent: C=C1SC(=C)S1
- Except where otherwise noted, data are given for materials in their standard state (at 25 °C [77 °F], 100 kPa). Infobox references

General structure of desaurins

Desaurins are a type of sulfur-containing heterocycle. The parent is 2,4-bismethylene-1,3-dithietane. They are derived from the base-promoted condensation of carbon disulfide with "active methylene" compounds:

2 Z_{2}CH_{2} + 2 CS_{2} → Z_{2}C=CS_{2}C=CZ_{2} + 2 H_{2}S

According to X-ray crystallography, the C_{4}S_{2} core of desaurins is planar. With unsymmetrical substitution (at the ends of the methylene groups), they can exist as separable cis and trans isomers.
