= Isophthalaldehyde =

Names
- Other names 1,3-Benzenedialdehyde, 1,3-Diformylbenzene

Identifiers
CAS Number	626-19-7
3D model (JSmol)	Interactive image
ChEMBL	ChEMBL2289228
ChemSpider	32002
ECHA InfoCard	100.009.942
EC Number	210-935-8
PubChem CID	34777
UNII	LU162B2N9X
CompTox Dashboard (EPA)	DTXSID30870718
- InChI: InChI=1S/C8H6O2/c9-5-7-2-1-3-8(4-7)6-10/h1-6H Key: IZALUMVGBVKPJD-UHFFFAOYSA-N
- SMILES: C1=CC(=CC(=C1)C=O)C=O

Properties
Chemical formula	C_{8}H_{6}O_{2}
Molar mass	134.134 g·mol^{−1}
Appearance	white
Density	1.395 g/cm^{3}
Melting point	89.5 °C (193.1 °F; 362.6 K)

Hazards
- GHS labelling
Pictograms	(GHS07: Exclamation mark)
Signal word	Warning
Hazard statements	H315, H319, H335
Precautionary statements	P261, P264, P271, P280, P302+P352, P304+P340, P305+P351+P338, P312, P321, P332+P313, P337+P313, P362, P403+P233, P405, P501
- Except where otherwise noted, data are given for materials in their standard state (at 25 °C [77 °F], 100 kPa). Infobox references

Isophthalaldehyde is an organic compound with the formula C_{6}H_{4}(CHO)_{2}. It is one of three isomers of benzene dicarbaldehyde, a reduced analog of phthalic acid. It is a colorless solid, although commercial samples often appear yellowish. One preparation entails the Sommelet reaction of α,α'-diamino-ortho-xylene.

== Reactions and use ==
Like many benzaldehydes, isophthalaldehyde forms a variety of Schiff base derivatives. Being bifunctional (having two formyl groups), isophthalaldehyde allows the formation of polymers or covalent organic frameworks upon reaction with di- or triamines. They also find use in metal coordination complexes.

== Related compounds ==
- Phthalaldehyde
- Terephthalaldehyde
- Benzaldehyde
- 2,6-Diformylpyridine
