= Nickel bis(stilbenedithiolate) =

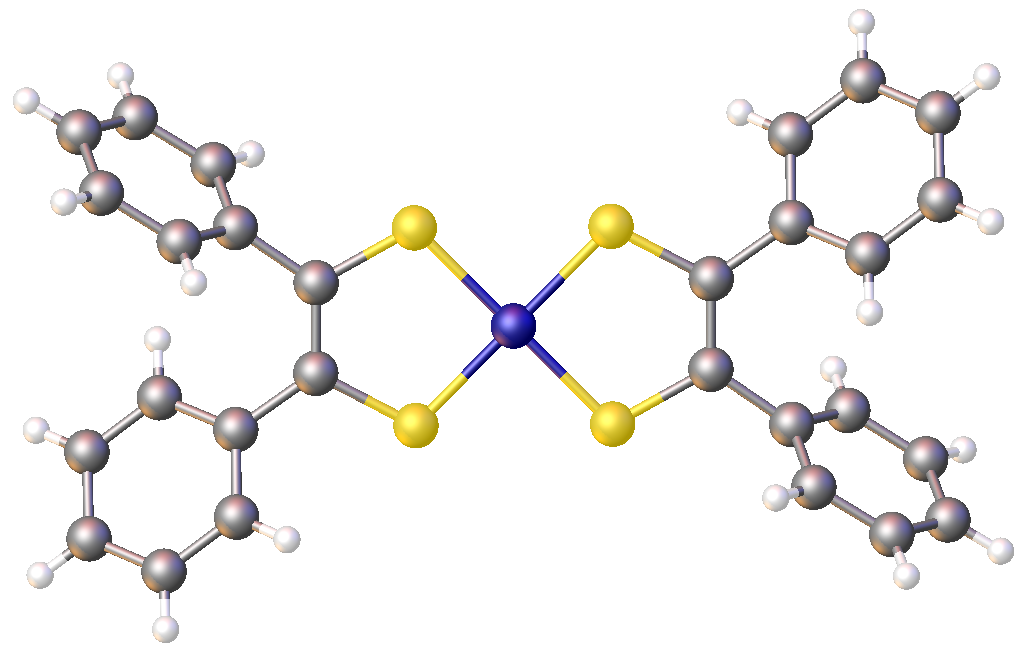

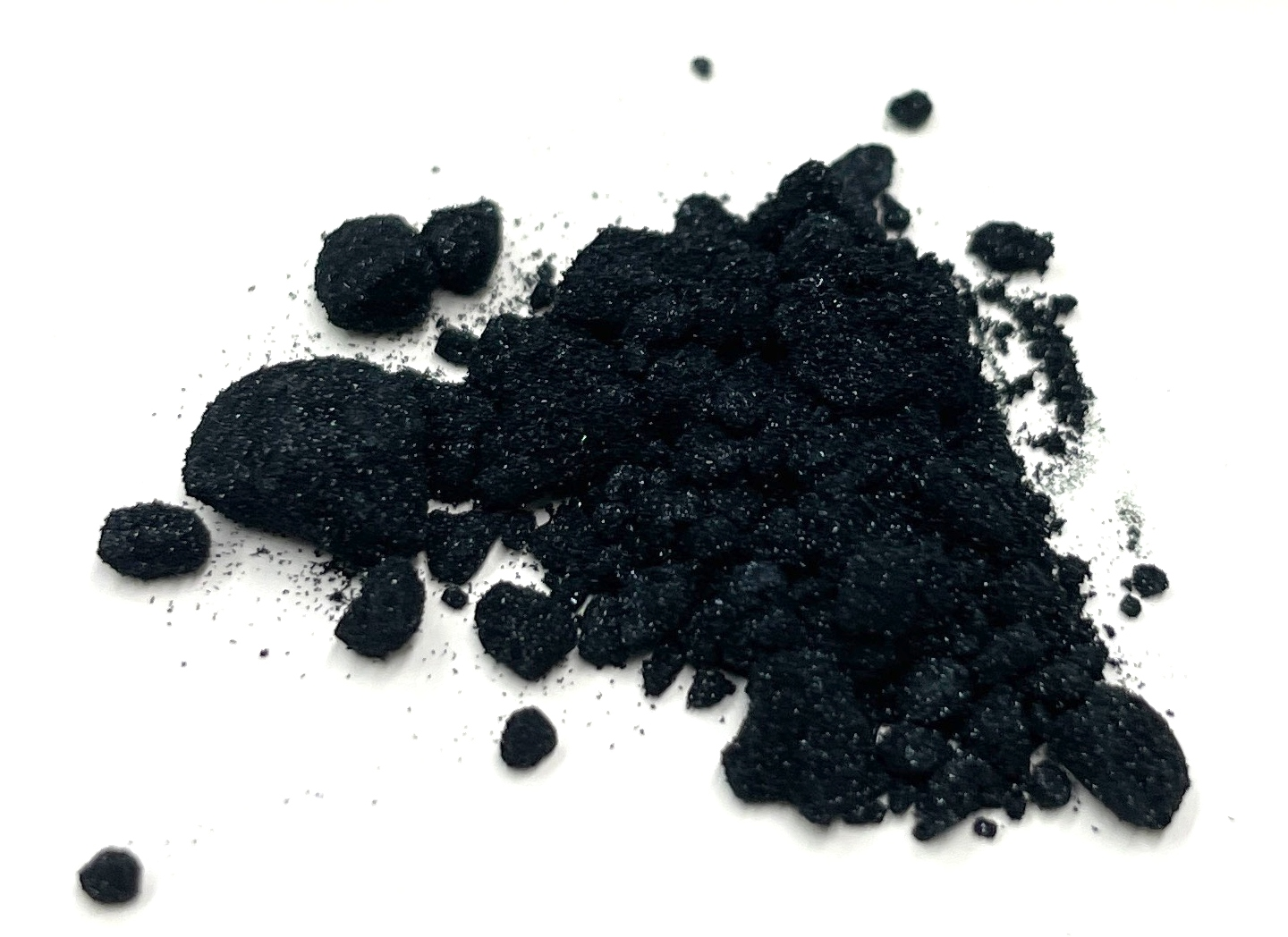

Names
- Other names bis[1,2-diphenyl-1,2-ethenedithiolato]nickel bis(dithiobenzil)nickel(II)

Identifiers
CAS Number	28984-20-5
3D model (JSmol)	Interactive image
ChemSpider	44211332
ECHA InfoCard	100.044.853
PubChem CID	5374634
CompTox Dashboard (EPA)	DTXSID5067427
- InChI: InChI=1S/2C14H12S2.Ni/c2*15-13(11-7-3-1-4-8-11)14(16)12-9-5-2-6-10-12;/h2*1-10,15-16H;/p-4/b2*14-13-; Key: LJISAPFYPQSNRX-DEWSNNOYSA-J
- SMILES: C1=CC=C(C=C1)/C(=C(/[S-])\C2=CC=CC=C2)/[S-].C1=CC=C(C=C1)/C(=C(/[S-])\C2=CC=CC=C2)/[S-].[Ni]

Properties
Chemical formula	C_{28}H_{20}NiS_{4}
Molar mass	543.40 g·mol^{−1}
Appearance	black-green solid
Density	1.466 g/cm^{3}
Melting point	260 °C (500 °F; 533 K)

Structure
Crystal structure	monoclinic
Space group	P2_{1}/n
Lattice constant	a = 0.5836 nm, b = 1.097 nm, c = 1.836 nm α = 90°, β = 91.4°, γ = 90°

Hazards
- GHS labelling
Hazard statements	H317, H334, H350, H372
Precautionary statements	P260, P270, P272, P280
Safety data sheet (SDS)	Bis(dithiobenzil)nickel(II). TCI
- Except where otherwise noted, data are given for materials in their standard state (at 25 °C [77 °F], 100 kPa). Infobox references

Nickel bis(stilbenedithiolate) or bis(dithiobenzil)nickel is a coordination complex with the formula Ni(S_{2}C_{2}Ph_{2})_{2} (where Ph = phenyl). It exists as a black solid that gives green solutions in toluene due to a strong absorption at 855 nm. The complex is a prototype of a large family of bis(dithiolene) complexes or the formula Ni(S_{2}C_{2}R_{2})_{2} (R = H, alkyl, aryl). These complexes have attracted much attention as dyes. They are of academic interest because the dithiolenes are noninnocent ligands. The lengths of the C-S and C-C bonds in the backbone, respectively 1.71 and 1.39 Å, are intermediate between double and single bonds.

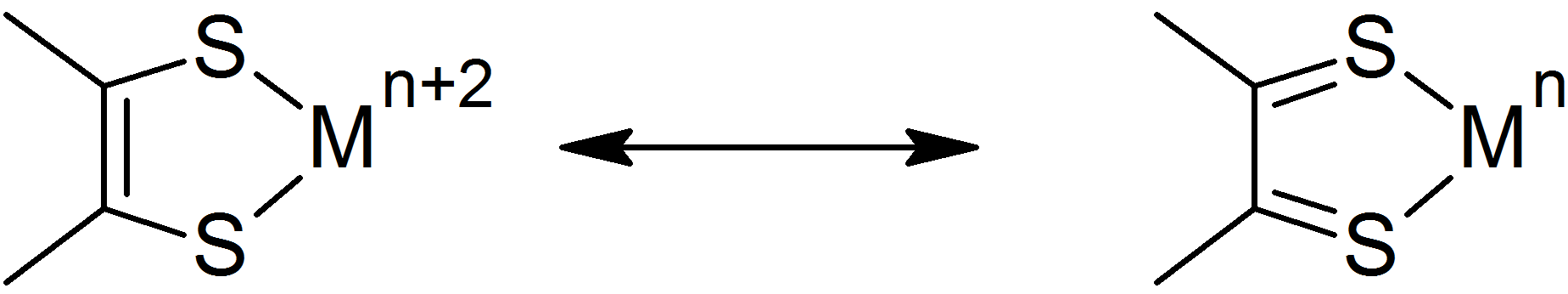
Limiting resonance structures of a R_{2}C_{2}S_{2}M ring

The complex was prepared originally by treating nickel sulfide with diphenylacetylene. High yielding syntheses involve treating nickel salts with sulfided benzoin. The complex reacts with ligands to form monodithiolene complexes of the type Ni(S_{2}C_{2}Ph_{2})L_{2}.
