= Thiete =

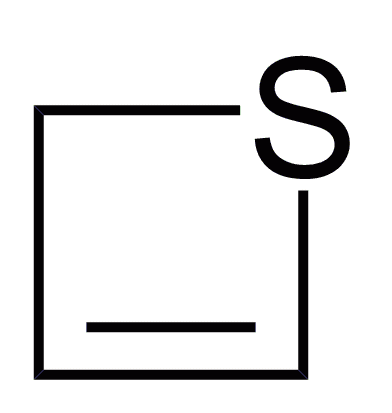

Names
- Preferred IUPAC name 2H-Thiete
- Other names 1-Thiacyclobut-2-ene

Identifiers
CAS Number	503-31-1
3D model (JSmol)	Interactive image
ChemSpider	2659702
PubChem CID	3415867
CompTox Dashboard (EPA)	DTXSID30392288
- InChI: InChI=1S/C3H4S/c1-2-4-3-1/h1-2H,3H2 Key: HPINPCFOKNNWNW-UHFFFAOYSA-N; InChI=1/C3H4S/c1-2-4-3-1/h1-2H,3H2 Key: HPINPCFOKNNWNW-UHFFFAOYAF
- SMILES: C1C=CS1

Properties
Chemical formula	C_{3}H_{4}S
Molar mass	72.12886
- Except where otherwise noted, data are given for materials in their standard state (at 25 °C [77 °F], 100 kPa). verify (what is ?) Infobox references

Thiete is a heterocyclic compound containing an unsaturated four-membered ring with three carbon atoms and one sulfur atom. It is more commonly encountered not on its own, but in anellated derivatives, several of which have been synthesized. Thietes are generally not very stable.

== Structure ==
Thiete is a valence isomer of the compound thioacrolein (CH_{2}=CHCH=S) and undergoes ring opening to it when heated at temperatures below 400 °C. Thiete has been shown to be planar, with a C-S-C angle of 76.8 degrees.

In principle, deprotonation should give a cyclic, planar anion with 6 π electrons, satisfying the Hückel criteria for aromaticity. Computer simulations in 1965 suggested that any aromatic stabilization was small, and other known approximation errors likely increased the instability. Certainly, attempts at deprotonation give only an uncharacterized mixture of decomposition products or nucleophilic substitution, even with relatively hindered bases.

== Derivatives ==
Benzothietes are thietes annulated to benzo group. Such species are prepared by flash vacuum pyrolysis of 2-mercaptobenzyl alcohols. They are precursors to other S-heterocycles.

Thiete 1,1-dioxides are sulfones, the parent being C_{3}H_{4}SO_{2}. They are more stable than the parent thietes. Substituted thiete-1,1-dioxides can be prepared through oxidation of thietes, elimination of thietane dioxides, or [2+2] cycloaddition of sulfenes and ynamines.

== See also ==
- Dithiete - analogue with two sulfur atoms
