= 4-Propylamphetamine =

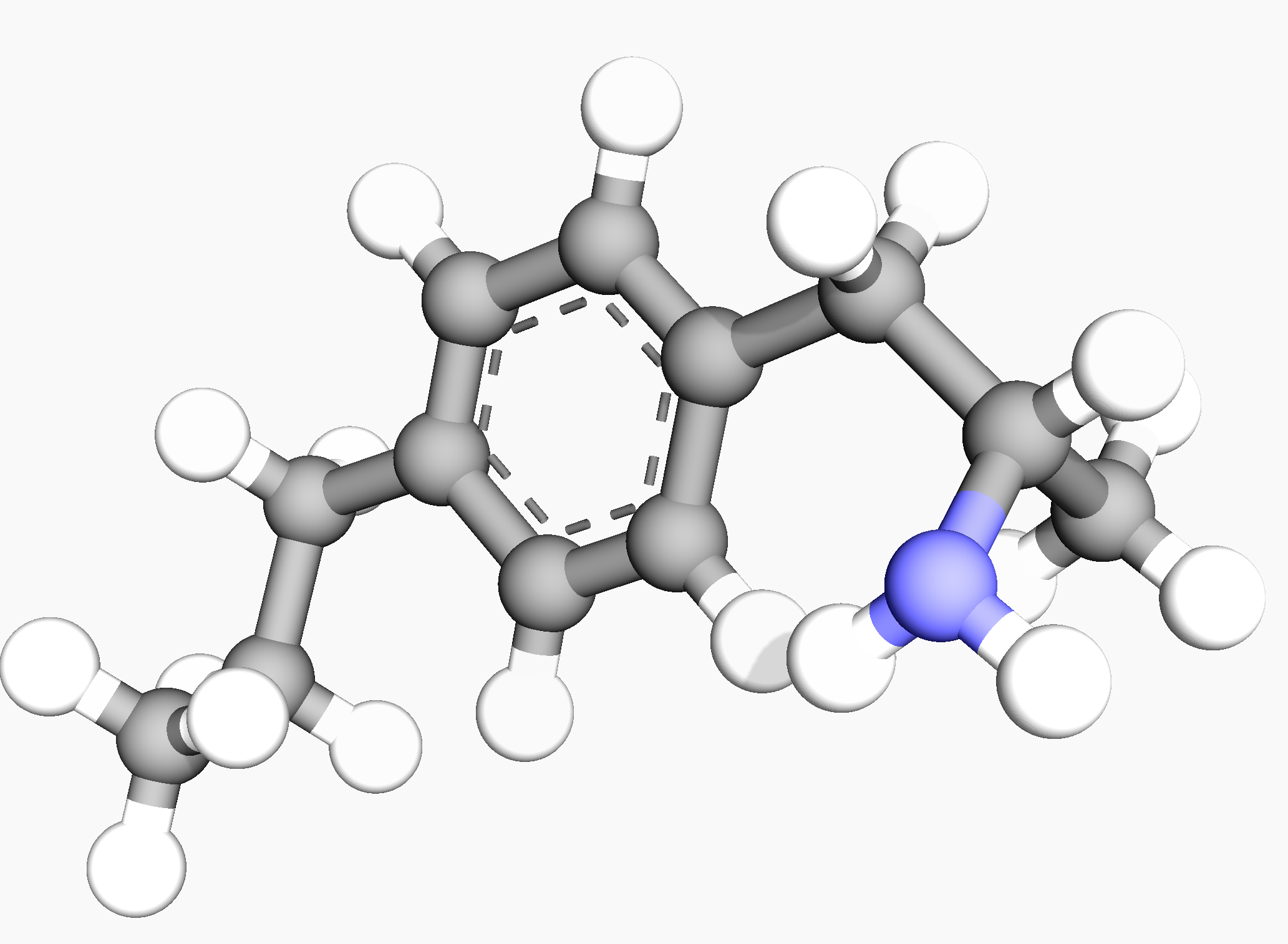

Clinical data
- Other names: 4-PrA; para-Propylamphetamine
- Drug class: serotonergic agent; psychedelic
- ATC code: None

Identifiers
- IUPAC name: 1-(4-propylphenyl)propan-2-amine
- PubChem CID: 15061884
- ChemSpider: 23234030
- ChEMBL: ChEMBL166185

Chemical and physical data
- Formula: C_{12}H_{19}N
- Molar mass: 177.291 g·mol^{−1}
- 3D model (JSmol): Interactive image
- SMILES: CCCC1=CC=C(C=C1)CC(C)N
- InChI: InChI=1S/C12H19N/c1-3-4-11-5-7-12(8-6-11)9-10(2)13/h5-8,10H,3-4,9,13H2,1-2H3; Key:MRPZLQUGNPYVGK-UHFFFAOYSA-N

4-Propylamphetamine (4-PrAor 4-PPA) is a serotonin receptor modulator of the phenethylamine and amphetamine families. It has shown weak affinity for the serotonin 5-HT_{2A} and 5-HT_{2C} receptors (K_{i} = 1,250 nM and 2,345 nM, respectively). The drug was described by Richard Glennon and colleagues in 1992.

== See also ==
- Substituted amphetamine
- DOPR
