= Propylamphetamine =

Chemical compound

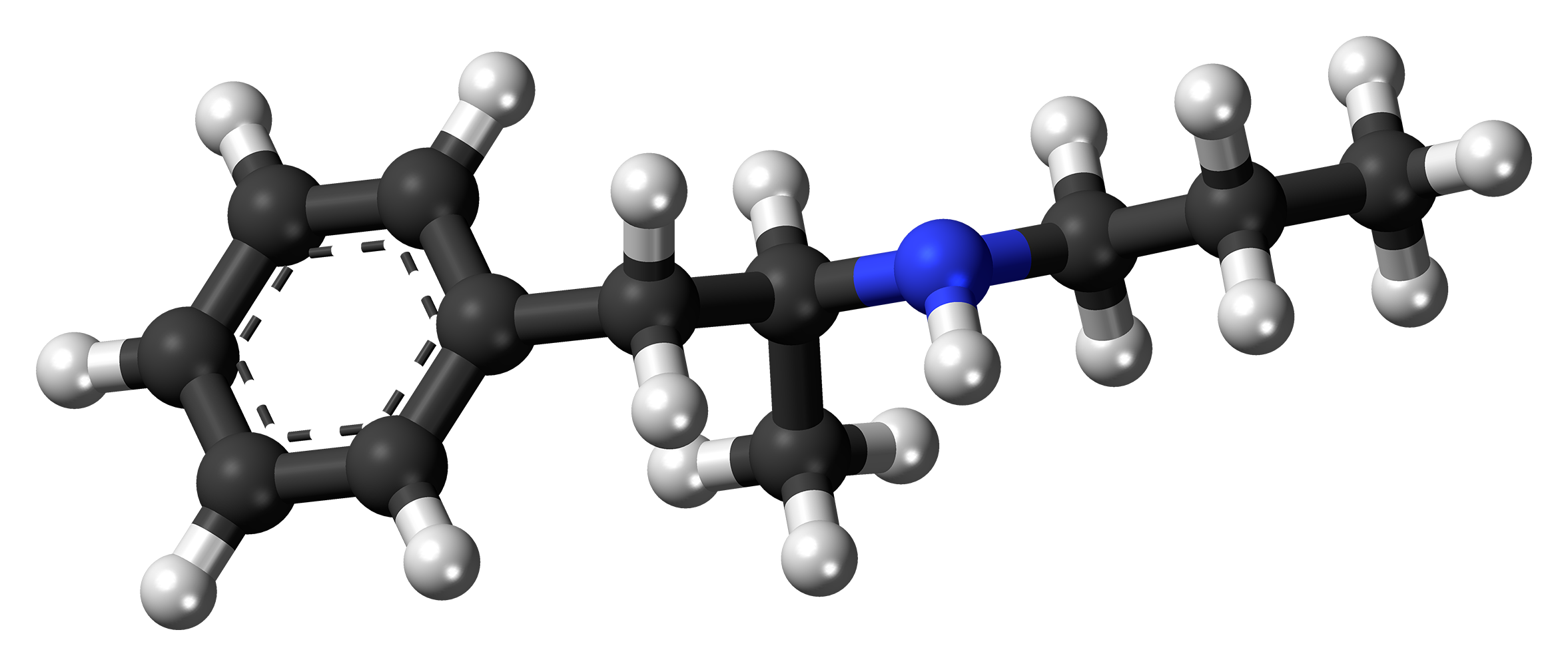

Clinical data
- Other names: N-Propylamphetamine; NPA; PAL-424
- ATC code: none

Legal status
- Legal status: UK: Not controlled

Pharmacokinetic data
- Metabolism: Hepatic
- Excretion: Renal

Identifiers
- IUPAC name: N-(1-methyl-2-phenylethyl)propan-1-amine
- CAS Number: 51799-32-7
- PubChem CID: 103544
- ChemSpider: 11655332
- UNII: E52ZLB6J7C
- CompTox Dashboard (EPA): DTXSID30966120
- ECHA InfoCard: 100.215.934

Chemical and physical data
- Formula: C_{12}H_{19}N
- Molar mass: 177.291 g·mol^{−1}
- 3D model (JSmol): Interactive image
- SMILES: NC(C)Cc1ccccc1CCC
- InChI: InChI=1S/C12H19N/c1-3-6-11-7-4-5-8-12(11)9-10(2)13/h4-5,7-8,10H,3,6,9,13H2,1-2H3; Key:VMVXCJCVBKWYTF-UHFFFAOYSA-N

Propylamphetamine (code name PAL-424; also known as N-propylamphetamine or NPA) is a central nervous system psychostimulant and substituted amphetamine which was never marketed. It was first developed in the 1970s, mainly for research into the metabolism of, and as a comparison tool to, other amphetamines.

Propylamphetamine is inactive as a dopamine releasing agent in vitro and instead acts as a low-potency dopamine reuptake inhibitor with an IC_{50} of 1,013 nM. The drug can be N-dealkylated to form amphetamine (10–20% excreted in urine after 24 hours). A study in rats found propylamphetamine to be approximately 4-fold less potent than amphetamine.

Monoamine release of propylamphetamine and related agents (EC_{50}, nM)
Compound	NE	DA	5-HT	Ref
Phenethylamine	10.9	39.5	>10,000	
d-Amphetamine	6.6–10.2	5.8–24.8	698–1,765	
d-Methamphetamine	12.3–14.3	8.5–40.4	736–1,292	
Ethylamphetamine	ND	88.5	ND	
d-Ethylamphetamine	28.8	44.1	333.0	
Propylamphetamine	ND	RI (1,013)	ND	
Butylamphetamine	ND	IA (>10,000)	ND	
Notes: The smaller the value, the more strongly the drug releases the neurotransmitter. The assays were done in rat brain synaptosomes and human potencies may be different. See also Monoamine releasing agent § Activity profiles for a larger table with more compounds. Refs:

== See also ==
- Methamphetamine
- Ethylamphetamine
- Isopropylamphetamine
- Butylamphetamine
- Fenproporex
- Mefenorex
- Phenylpropylaminopentane (PPAP)
