= Non-innocent ligand =

Ligand with unclear oxidation state

In chemistry, a (redox) non-innocent ligand is a ligand in a metal complex where the oxidation state is not clear. Typically, complexes containing non-innocent ligands are redox active at mild potentials. The concept assumes that redox reactions in metal complexes are either metal or ligand localized, which is a simplification, albeit a useful one.

C.K. Jørgensen first described ligands as "innocent" and "suspect": "Ligands are innocent when they allow oxidation states of the central atoms to be defined. The simplest case of a suspect ligand is NO..."

== Redox reactions of complexes of innocent vs. non-innocent ligands ==
Conventionally, redox reactions of coordination complexes are assumed to be metal-centered. The reduction of MnO_{4}^{−} to MnO_{4}^{2−} is described by the change in oxidation state of manganese from +7 to +6. The oxide ligands do not change in oxidation state, remaining −2. Oxide is an innocent ligand. Another example of conventional metal-centered redox couple is [Co(NH_{3})_{6}]^{3+}/[Co(NH_{3})_{6}]^{2+}. Ammonia is innocent in this transformation.

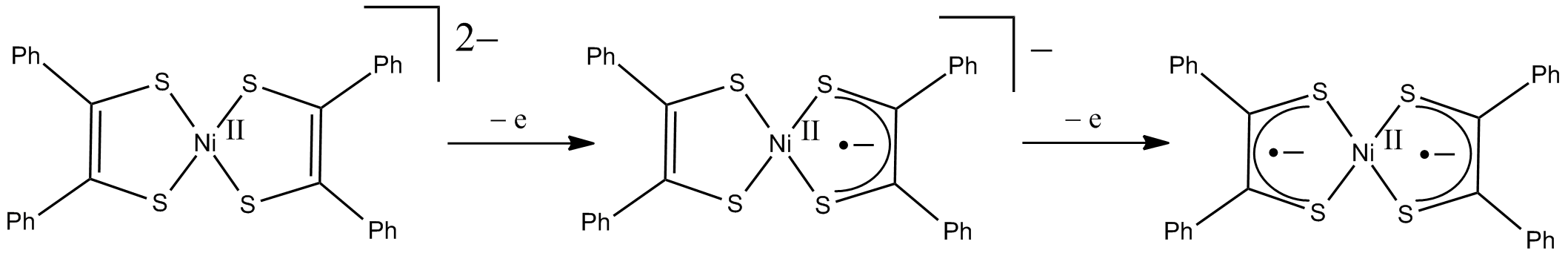

Redox non-innocent behavior of ligands is illustrated by nickel bis(stilbenedithiolate) ([Ni(S_{2}C_{2}Ph_{2})_{2}]^{z}). As all bis(1,2-dithiolene) complexes of nd^{8} metal ions, three oxidation states can be identified: z = −2, −1, and 0. If the ligands are always considered to be dianionic (as is done in formal oxidation state counting), then z = 0 requires that that nickel has a formal oxidation state of +4. The formal oxidation state of the central nickel atom therefore ranges from +2 to +4 in the above transformations (see Figure). However, the formal oxidation state is different from the real (spectroscopic) oxidation state based on the (spectroscopic) metal d-electron configuration. The stilbene-1,2-dithiolate behaves as a redox non-innocent ligand, and the oxidation processes actually take place at the ligands rather than the metal. This leads to the formation of ligand radical complexes. The charge-neutral complex (z =0), showing a partial singlet diradical character, is therefore better described as a Ni^{2+} derivative of the radical anion S_{2}C_{2}Ph_{2}^{•−}. The diamagnetism of this complex arises from anti-ferromagnetic coupling between the unpaired electrons of the two ligand radicals. Another example is higher oxidation states of copper complexes of diamido phenyl ligands that are stabilized by intramolecular multi center hydrogen bonding

== Typical non-innocent ligands ==
- Nitrosyl (NO) binds to metals in one of two extreme geometries - bent where NO is treated as a pseudohalide (NO^{−}), and linear, where NO is treated as NO^{+}.
- Dioxygen can be non-innocent, since it exists in two oxidation states, superoxide (O_{2}^{−}) and peroxide (O_{2}^{2−}).

Ligands with extended pi-delocalization such as porphyrins, phthalocyanines, and corroles and ligands with the generalised formulas [D-CR=CR-D]^{n−} (D = O, S, NR’ and R, R' = alkyl or aryl) are often non-innocent. In contrast, [D-CR=CR-CR=D]^{−} such as NacNac or acac are innocent.

- catecholates and related 1,2-dioxolenes.
- dithiolenes, such as maleonitriledithiolate (see example of [Ni(S_{2}C_{2}Ph_{2})_{2}]^{n−} above).
- 1,2-diimines such as derivatives of 1,2-diamidobenzene, 2,2'-bipyridine, and dimethylglyoxime. The complex Cr(2,2'-bipyridine)_{3} is a derivative of Cr(III) bound to three bipyridine^{1−} ligands. On the other hand, one-electron oxidation of [Ru(2,2'-bipyridine)_{3}]^{2+} is localized on Ru and the bipyridine is behaving as a normal, innocent ligand in this case.
- ligands containing ferrocene can have oxidation events centered on the ferrocene iron center rather than the catalytically active metal center.
- pyridine-2,6-diimine ligands can be reduced by one and two electrons.

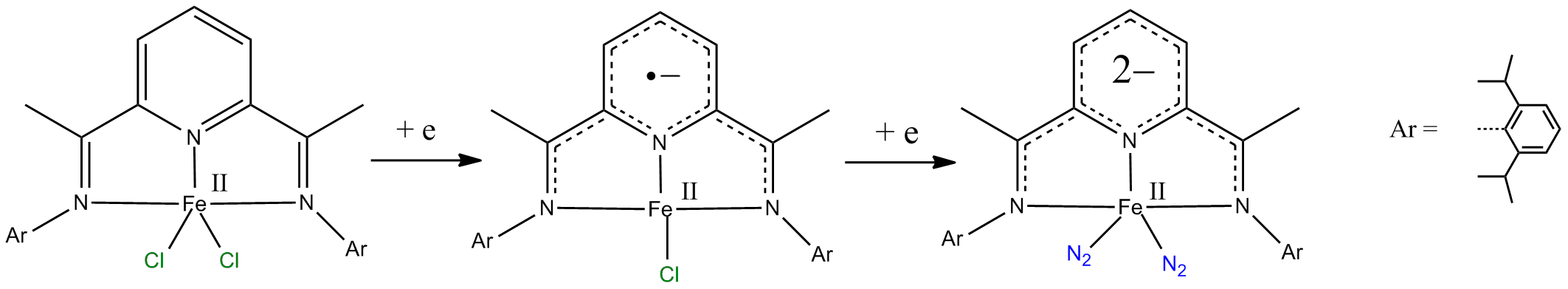

== Redox non-innocent ligands in biology and homogeneous catalysis ==
In certain enzymatic processes, redox non-innocent cofactors provide redox equivalents to complement the redox properties of metalloenzymes. Of course, most redox reactions in nature involve innocent systems, e.g. [4Fe-4S] clusters. The additional redox equivalents provided by redox non-innocent ligands are also used as controlling factors to steer homogeneous catalysis.

=== Hemes ===
:

Oxygen rebound mechanism utilized by cytochrome P450 for conversion of hydrocarbons to alcohols via the action of "compound I", an iron(IV) oxide bound to a radical heme, which is non-innocent.

Porphyrin ligands can be innocent (−2) or noninnocent (−1). In the enzymes chloroperoxidase and cytochrome P450, the porphyrin ligand sustains oxidation during the catalytic cycle, notably in the formation of Compound I. In other heme proteins, such as myoglobin, ligand-centered redox does not occur and the porphyrin is innocent.

=== Galactose oxidase ===
The catalytic cycle of galactose oxidase (GOase), found in fungi, illustrates the involvement of non-innocent ligands. GOase oxidizes primary alcohols into aldehydes using O_{2} and releasing H_{2}O_{2}. The active site of the enzyme GOase features a tyrosyl coordinated to a Cu^{II} ion. In the key steps of the catalytic cycle, a cooperative Brønsted-basic ligand-site deprotonates the alcohol, and subsequently the oxygen atom of the tyrosinyl radical abstracts a hydrogen atom from the alpha-CH functionality of the coordinated alkoxide substrate. The tyrosinyl radical participates in the catalytic cycle: 1e-oxidation is effected by the Cu(II/I) couple and the 1e oxidation is effected by the tyrosyl radical, giving an overall 2e change. The radical abstraction is fast. Anti-ferromagnetic coupling between the unpaired spins of the tyrosine radical ligand and the d^{9} Cu^{II} center gives rise to the diamagnetic ground state, consistent with synthetic models.

== See also ==
- Electromerism
- Isomerism
  - Chiral molecules
- Redox
