= Isopropylamphetamine =

Chemical compound

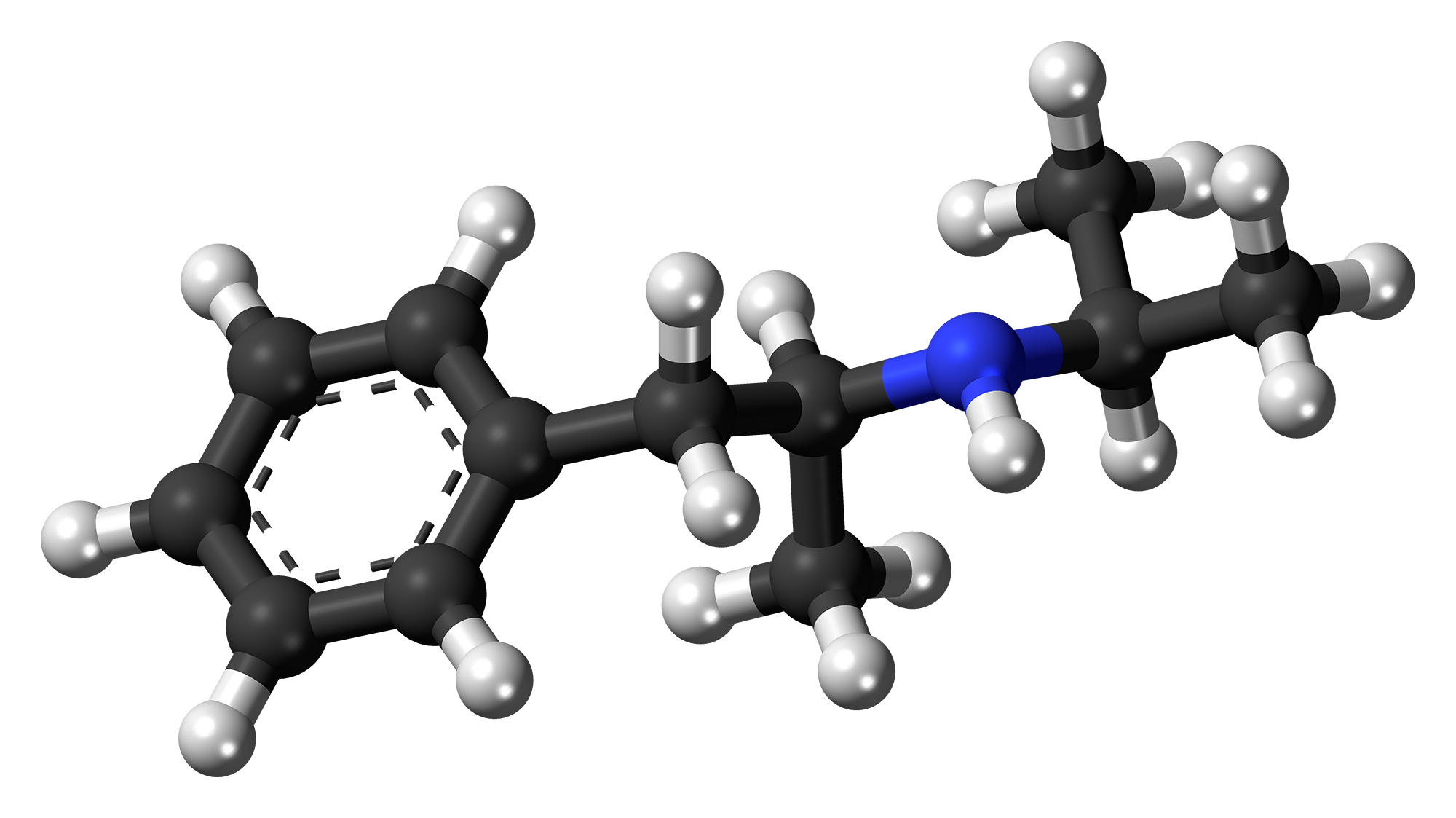

Clinical data
- Other names: N-isopropylamphetamine
- ATC code: none

Identifiers
- IUPAC name: 1-phenyl-N-(propan-2-yl)propan-2-amine
- CAS Number: 33236-69-0
- PubChem CID: 213536
- ChemSpider: 185142
- UNII: 8XR4H66ACF
- ChEMBL: ChEMBL2008764
- CompTox Dashboard (EPA): DTXSID80954875

Chemical and physical data
- Formula: C_{12}H_{19}N
- Molar mass: 177.291 g·mol^{−1}
- 3D model (JSmol): Interactive image
- SMILES: CC(NC(C)C)CC1=CC=CC=C1
- InChI: InChI=1S/C12H19N/c1-10(2)13-11(3)9-12-7-5-4-6-8-12/h4-8,10-11,13H,9H2,1-3H3; Key:PJXXJRMRHFYMEY-UHFFFAOYSA-N

Isopropylamphetamine is a psychostimulant of the substituted amphetamine class. It is an isomer of propylamphetamine and was discovered by a team at Astra Läkemedel AB. The isopropyl moiety reduces the stimulant activity of the compound but greatly increases the duration of action. For this reason, the compound is not used recreationally.

== See also ==
- Amphetamine
- Ethylamphetamine
- Methamphetamine
- Propylamphetamine
- Butylamphetamine
- Isoprenaline
