= Mefenorex =

Pharmaceutical drug

Clinical data
- Trade names: Rondimen, Pondinil, Anexate
- Other names: N-(3-Chloropropyl)amphetamine
- ATC code: A08AA09 (WHO)

Legal status
- Legal status: BR: Class B2 (Anorectic drugs); CA: Schedule I; DE: Anlage II (Authorized trade only, not prescriptible)

Identifiers
- IUPAC name: 3-chloro-N-(1-methyl-2-phenylethyl)propan-1-amine
- CAS Number: 17243-57-1
- PubChem CID: 21777
- ChemSpider: 20467
- UNII: K98M4N387W
- KEGG: D07891
- CompTox Dashboard (EPA): DTXSID6057665
- ECHA InfoCard: 100.037.511

Chemical and physical data
- Formula: C_{12}H_{18}ClN
- Molar mass: 211.73 g·mol^{−1}
- 3D model (JSmol): Interactive image
- SMILES: ClCCCNC(Cc1ccccc1)C
- InChI: InChI=1S/C12H18ClN/c1-11(14-9-5-8-13)10-12-6-3-2-4-7-12/h2-4,6-7,11,14H,5,8-10H2,1H3; Key:XXVROGAVTTXONC-UHFFFAOYSA-N

Mefenorex (marketed as Rondimen, Pondinil, Anexate), also known as N-(3-chloropropyl)amphetamine, is an amphetamine derivative with a relatively mild psychostimulant profile. Developed in the 1960s, it was used throughout the 1970s as an appetite suppressant for treating obesity. Mefenorex is a prodrug of amphetamine; upon ingestion, the compound will begin to metabolize into, as well as promote the production of, the active metabolites levoamphetamine and dextroamphetamine. Multiple sources have noted the substance as exerting "mild stimulant effects....[and having] relatively little abuse potential."

== See also ==
- Substituted amphetamine
- Propylamphetamine
- Fenproporex
