= Fosthietan =

Names
- Preferred IUPAC name Diethyl N-(1,3-dithietan-2-ylidene)phosphoramidate

Identifiers
CAS Number	21548-32-3
3D model (JSmol)	Interactive image
ChEBI	CHEBI:82133
ChemSpider	28473
ECHA InfoCard	100.040.383
EC Number	244-437-7
KEGG	C18999
PubChem CID	30684
UNII	4LD157TUHJ
UN number	3018
CompTox Dashboard (EPA)	DTXSID4041993
- InChI: InChI=1S/C6H12NO3PS2/c1-3-9-11(8,10-4-2)7-6-12-5-13-6/h3-5H2,1-2H3 Key: RHJOIOVESMTJEK-UHFFFAOYSA-N; InChI=1/C6H12NO3PS2/c1-3-9-11(8,10-4-2)7-6-12-5-13-6/h3-5H2,1-2H3 Key: RHJOIOVESMTJEK-UHFFFAOYAP
- SMILES: O=P(OCC)(/N=C1\SCS1)OCC

Properties
Chemical formula	C_{6}H_{12}NO_{3}PS_{2}
Molar mass	241.26 g·mol^{−1}

Hazards
- GHS labelling
Pictograms	(GHS06: Toxic)
Signal word	Danger
Hazard statements	H300, H310
Precautionary statements	P262, P264, P270, P280, P301+P310, P302+P350, P310, P321, P322, P330, P361, P363, P405, P501
- Except where otherwise noted, data are given for materials in their standard state (at 25 °C [77 °F], 100 kPa). Infobox references

Fosthietan (chemical formula:C_{6}H_{12}NO_{3}PS_{2}) is an organophosphate compound used in insecticides and nematicides. It is a pale-yellow liquid with an odor similar to mercaptan. It is extremely toxic.

== History ==
Fosthietan was first introduced by American Cyanamid in 1972. Due to its high toxicity, its use has almost entirely disappeared.
