= 2,6-Diacetylpyridine =

- Skeletal formula

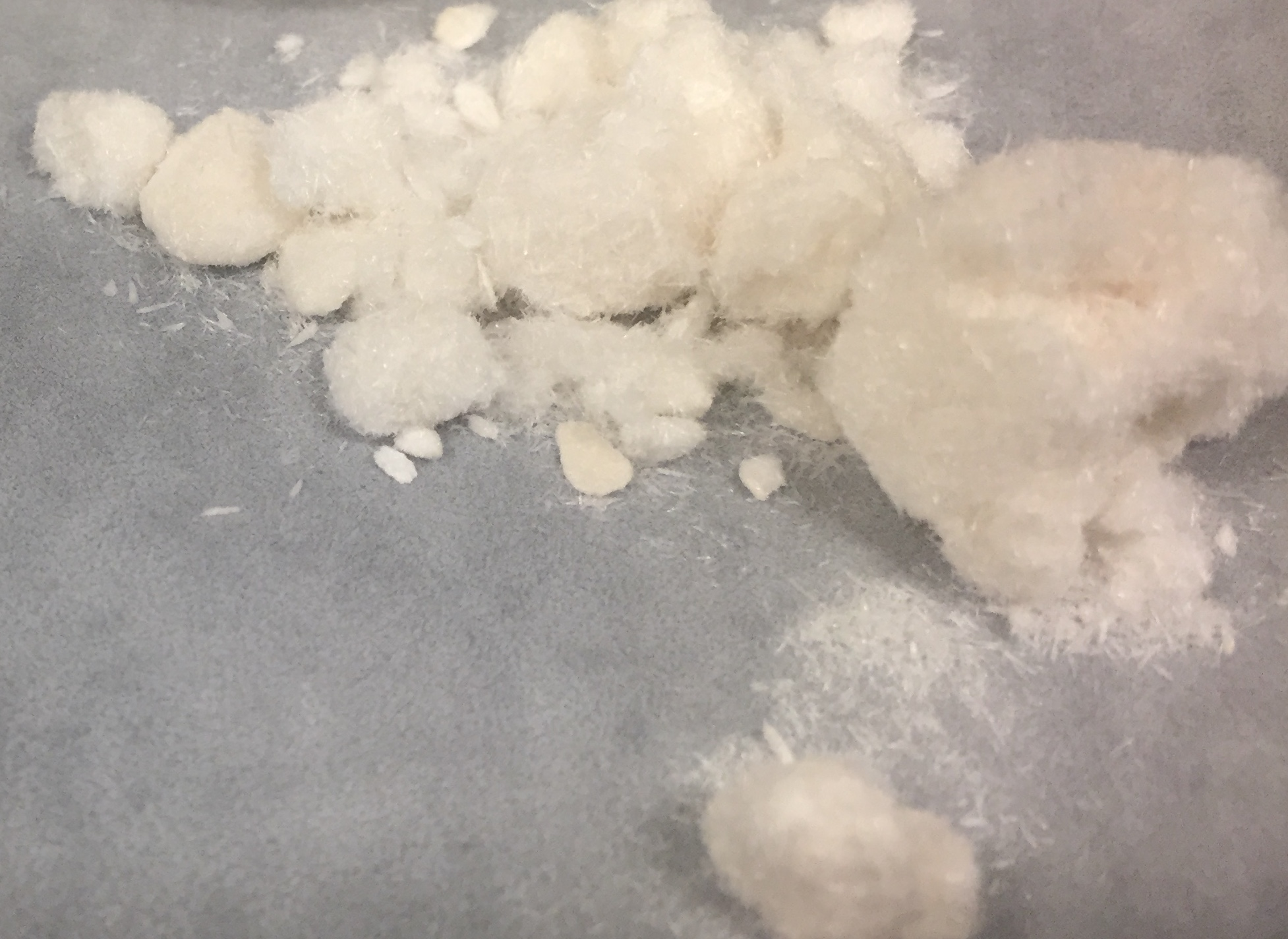

Names
- Preferred IUPAC name 1,1′-(Pyridine-2,6-diyl)di(ethan-1-one)
- Other names 1,1′-(Pyridine-2,6-diyl)diethanone; 1-(6-Acetylpyridin-2-yl)ethanone; DAP; 2,6-Bisacetylpyridine

Identifiers
CAS Number	1129-30-2
3D model (JSmol)	Interactive image
ChemSpider	63955
ECHA InfoCard	100.013.130
EC Number	214-442-9
PubChem CID	70790
UNII	P34UXL3MYV
CompTox Dashboard (EPA)	DTXSID10150202
- InChI: InChI=1S/C9H9NO2/c1-6(11)8-4-3-5-9(10-8)7(2)12/h3-5H,1-2H3 Key: BEZVGIHGZPLGBL-UHFFFAOYSA-N
- SMILES: CC(=O)c1cccc(n1)C(=O)C

Properties
Chemical formula	C_{9}H_{9}NO_{2}
Molar mass	163.176 g·mol^{−1}
Appearance	White crystals
Density	1.119 g/cm^{3}
Melting point	81 °C (178 °F; 354 K) Sublimes at 110 to 130 °C (230 to 266 °F; 383 to 403 K)
Boiling point	126 °C (259 °F; 399 K)

Hazards
- GHS labelling
Pictograms	(GHS07: Exclamation mark)
Signal word	Warning
Hazard statements	H315, H319, H335
Precautionary statements	P261, P264, P271, P280, P302+P352, P304+P340, P305+P351+P338, P312, P321, P332+P313, P337+P313, P362, P403+P233, P405, P501
Safety data sheet (SDS)	MSDS sheet

Related compounds
Related pyridines	2-acetylpyridine
- Except where otherwise noted, data are given for materials in their standard state (at 25 °C [77 °F], 100 kPa). verify (what is ?) Infobox references

2,6-Diacetylpyridine is an organic compound with the formula C_{5}H_{3}N(C(O)CH_{3})_{2}. It is a white solid that is soluble in organic solvents. It is a disubstituted pyridine. It is a precursor to ligands in coordination chemistry.

== Synthesis ==
The synthesis of 2,6-diacetylpyridine begins with oxidation of the methyl groups in 2,6-lutidine to form dipicolinic acid. This process has been well established with potassium permanganate and selenium dioxide. The diketone can be formed from the diester of picolinic acid groups through a Claisen condensation. The resulting adduct can be decarboxylated to give diacetylpyridine.

DAP synthesis Claisen

Treating 2,6-pyridinedicarbonitrile with methylmagnesium bromide provides an alternative synthesis for the diketone.

DAP synthesis Grignard

== Precursor to Schiff base ligands ==
Diacetylpyridine is a popular starting material for ligands in coordination chemistry, often via template reactions. The diiminopyridine (DIP) class of ligands can be formed from diacetylpyridine through Schiff base condensation with substituted anilines. Diiminopyridine ligands have been the focus of much interest due to their ability to traverse a wide range of oxidation states.

diiminopyridine_synthesis

In azamacrocycle chemistry, diacetylpyridines can undergo the same Schiff base condensation with N1-(3-aminopropyl)propane-1,3-diamines. The product of the condensation can be hydrogenated to yield macrocyclic tetradentate ligands. Similar penta- and hexadentate ligands have been synthesized by varying the polyamine chain.

== See also ==
- 2,6-Diformylpyridine
