= 2,3-Dihydrothiophene =

Names
- Preferred IUPAC name 2,3-Dihydrothiophene
- Other names 2-Thiolene

Identifiers
CAS Number	1120-59-8
3D model (JSmol)	Interactive image; Interactive image
ChemSpider	120627
PubChem CID	136880
UNII	9WWU9T5GZH
CompTox Dashboard (EPA)	DTXSID20149809
- InChI: InChI=1S/C4H6S/c1-2-4-5-3-1/h1,3H,2,4H2 Key: OXBLVCZKDOZZOJ-UHFFFAOYSA-N; InChI=1/C4H6S/c1-2-4-5-3-1/h1,3H,2,4H2 Key: OXBLVCZKDOZZOJ-UHFFFAOYAG
- SMILES: C1CSC=C1; S1\C=C/CC1

Properties
Chemical formula	C_{4}H_{6}S
Molar mass	86.16 g/mol
Appearance	colorless liquid
Density	1.04 g·cm^{−3} (20 °C)
Melting point	−110 °C (−166 °F; 163 K)
Boiling point	112 °C (234 °F; 385 K)
Refractive index (n_{D})	1.53 (20 °C)
- Except where otherwise noted, data are given for materials in their standard state (at 25 °C [77 °F], 100 kPa). verify (what is ?) Infobox references

2,3-Dihydrothiophene is a heterocyclic compound and an organosulfur compound with the formula SC_{4}H_{6}. It is isomeric with the more symmetrical 2,5-dihydrothiophene. Both isomers of dihydrothiophene are colorless liquids with a thioether-like odor. In terms of their reactivity, both isomers exhibit characteristics of alkenes and thioethers, undergoing addition reactions at carbon and oxidation at sulfur. In contrast, thiophene engages in neither reaction.

== Dihydrothiophenes in nature ==
2,3-dihydrothiophene is present in dry fermented sausages, a product of the fermentation process. It has a nutty aroma.

Dihydrothiophenes contribute to the aroma of the white truffle. The major component is 3-methyl-4,5-dihydrothiophene (alternative name:4-methyl-2,3-dihydrothiophene), produced by bacterial colonies in the truffle's fruiting bodies.
