= 1,3-Dithietane =

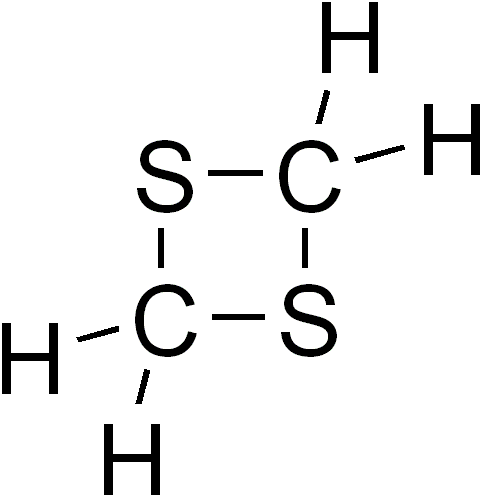

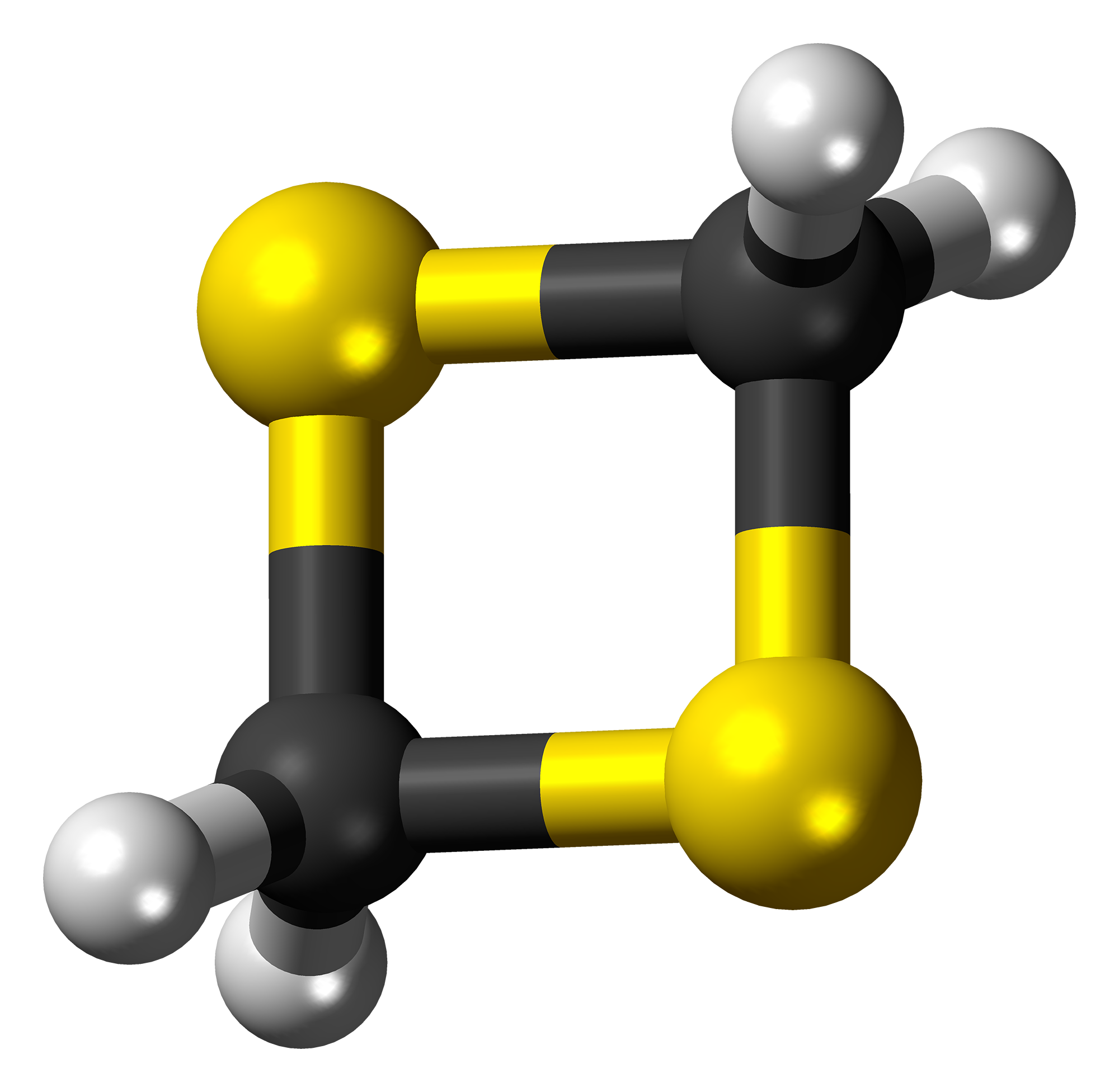

Names
- Preferred IUPAC name 1,3-Dithietane
- Other names 1,3-Dithiacyclobutane

Identifiers
CAS Number	287-53-6
3D model (JSmol)	Interactive image
ChemSpider	119906
PubChem CID	136129
UNII	XQ54M93UBZ
CompTox Dashboard (EPA)	DTXSID10182861
- InChI: InChI=1S/C2H4S2/c1-3-2-4-1/h1-2H2 Key: ITXACGPMGJCSKF-UHFFFAOYSA-N; InChI=1/C2H4S2/c1-3-2-4-1/h1-2H2 Key: ITXACGPMGJCSKF-UHFFFAOYAY
- SMILES: C1SCS1

Properties
Chemical formula	C_{2}H_{4}S_{2}
Molar mass	92.18 g/mol
- Except where otherwise noted, data are given for materials in their standard state (at 25 °C [77 °F], 100 kPa). verify (what is ?) Infobox references

1,3-Dithietane is a dithietane. It is a colorless, crystalline, unpleasant-smelling solid. It was first prepared in 1976 by the reaction of bis(chloromethyl) sulfoxide with sodium sulfide to give 1,3-dithietane 1-oxide, followed by THF-borane reduction.

Synthesis of 1,3-dithietane
