= Dihydrothiophene =

Chemical structures of 2,3-dihydrothiophene (left) and 2,5-dihydrothiophene (right)

Dihydrothiophenes are heterocyclic organosulfur compounds. Two isomers are possible for the parent C_{4}H_{6}S:

- 2,3-Dihydrothiophene, a vinyl thioether. CAS RN = 1120-59-8.
- 2,5-Dihydrothiophene, an allylic thioether. A well-known derivative is 2,5-dihydrothiophene 1,1-dioxide. CAS RN = 1708-32-3.

Depending on the substituents, some dihydrothiophenes are called 4,5-dihydrothiophenes.
