= Cavitand =

Molecule able to contain another molecule within itself

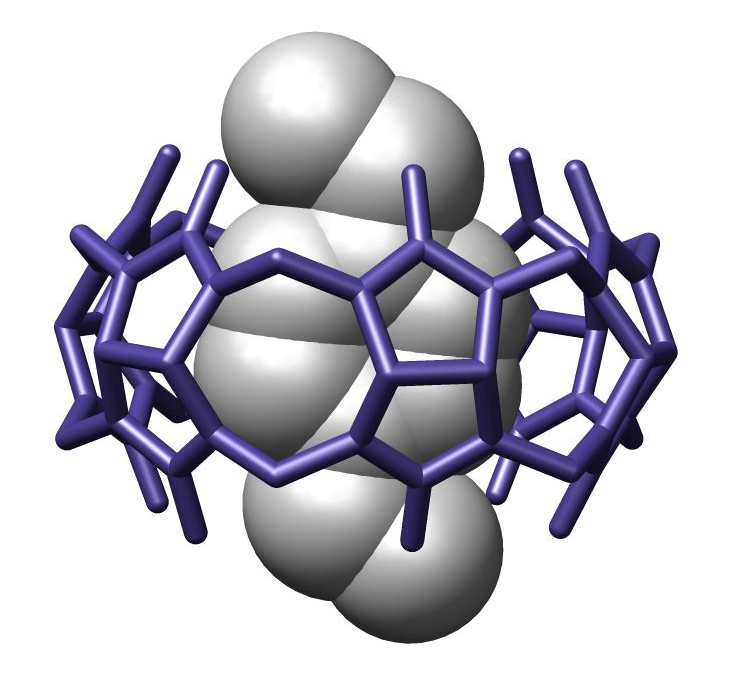
A cavitand cucurbituril bound with a guest p-xylylenediammonium

In chemistry, a cavitand is a container-shaped molecule. The cavity of the cavitand allows it to engage in host–guest chemistry with guest molecules of a complementary shape and size. The original definition proposed by Cram includes many classes of molecules: cyclodextrins, calixarenes, pillararenes and cucurbiturils. However, modern usage in the field of supramolecular chemistry specifically refers to cavitands formed on a resorcinarene scaffold by bridging adjacent phenolic units. The simplest bridging unit is methylene (−CH_{2}−), although dimethylene (−(CH_{2})_{2}−), trimethylene (−(CH_{2})_{3}−), benzal, xylyl, pyridyl, 2,3-disubstituted-quinoxaline, o-dinitrobenzyl, dialkylsilylene, and phosphonates are known. Cavitands that have an extended aromatic bridging unit, or an extended cavity containing 3 rows of aromatic rings are referred to as deep-cavity cavitands and have broad applications in host-guest chemistry. These types of cavitands were extensively investigated by Rebek, and Gibb, among others.

== Applications of Cavitands ==
Specific cavitands form the basis of rigid templates onto which de novo proteins can be chemically linked. This template assembled synthetic protein (TASP) structure provides a platform for the study of protein structure.

Silicon surfaces functionalized with tetraphosphonate cavitands have been used to singularly detect sarcosine in water and urine solutions.

== See also ==
- Molecular recognition
