= Ligand (disambiguation) =

Ligand may refer to:

- Ligand, an atom, ion, or functional group that donates one or more of its electrons through a coordinate covalent bond to one or more central atoms or ions
- Ligand (biochemistry), a substance that binds to a protein
- a 'guest' in host–guest chemistry

== See also ==
- Ligand-gated ion channel
