= Anion complex =

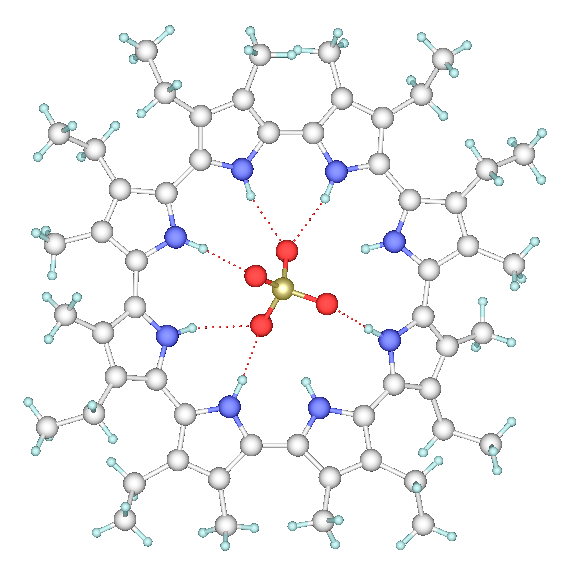
Binding of sulfate by a diprotonated calixpyrrole. The multiple hydrogen bonds are indicated by dotted lines. Color code: blue=N, red = O, white = C.

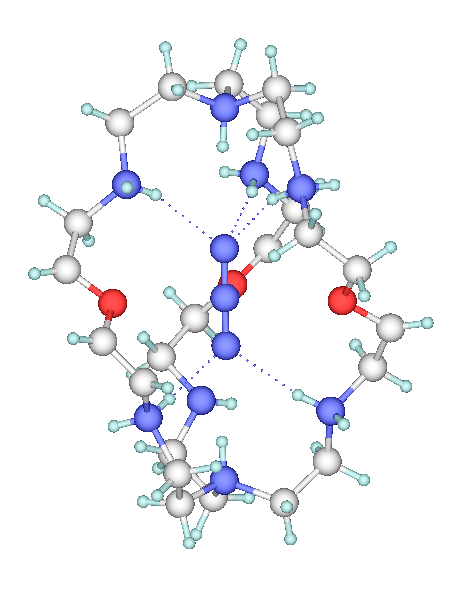
Azide complex of bistren cryptand, an early example of an anion complex.

An anion complex is a coordination complex with the anion as the central ion. The topic is related to salt bridges found in proteins. Anions of interest range from simple halides, sulfate, phosphate up to complex anions like polyphosphates.

== Guest anions ==
Unlike traditional coordination complexes where the center position is occupied by a metal, here the central position is occupied by an anion such as halides. Several examples are known where the central position is occupied by a polyatomic anion such as azide, sulfate, thiosulfate, and various phosphates.

== Anion binding modalities ==
Anion complexation is a subset of supramolecular chemistry since non-covalent interactions are particularly important. With regard to determinants of binding strength, ion pairing is important Selectivity e.g. within the halide series has been achieved, mostly by hydrogen bonds contributions. Because hydrogen bonds are weaker than normal coordinate bonds, the ligands in anion complexes present several hydrogen bond donors. For this reason, anion complexes are often discussed as inclusion compounds.

In view of the importance of ion pairing and hydrogen bonding, typical anion binders are cationic and feature multiple hydrogen bond donors. These hydrogen bond donors are often N-H groups of amides and ammonium ions. Cases are known where C-H bonds engage the anion.

== Major references ==
- Bowman-James K, Bianchi A, García-Espana E, eds. (2012). Anion Coordination Chemistry. Weinheim: Wiley-VCH. ISBN 978-3527323708.
- Sessler JL, Gale PA, Cho WS, eds. (2006). Anion receptor chemistry. Cambridge: Royal Society of Chemistry. ISBN 978-0854049745.
- Gale PA, Dehaen W, eds. (2010). Anion Recognition in Supramolecular Chemistry. Springer Science. Bibcode:2010arsc.book.....G. ISBN 978-3642264702.
