= Molecular gyroscope =

Type of chemical compound

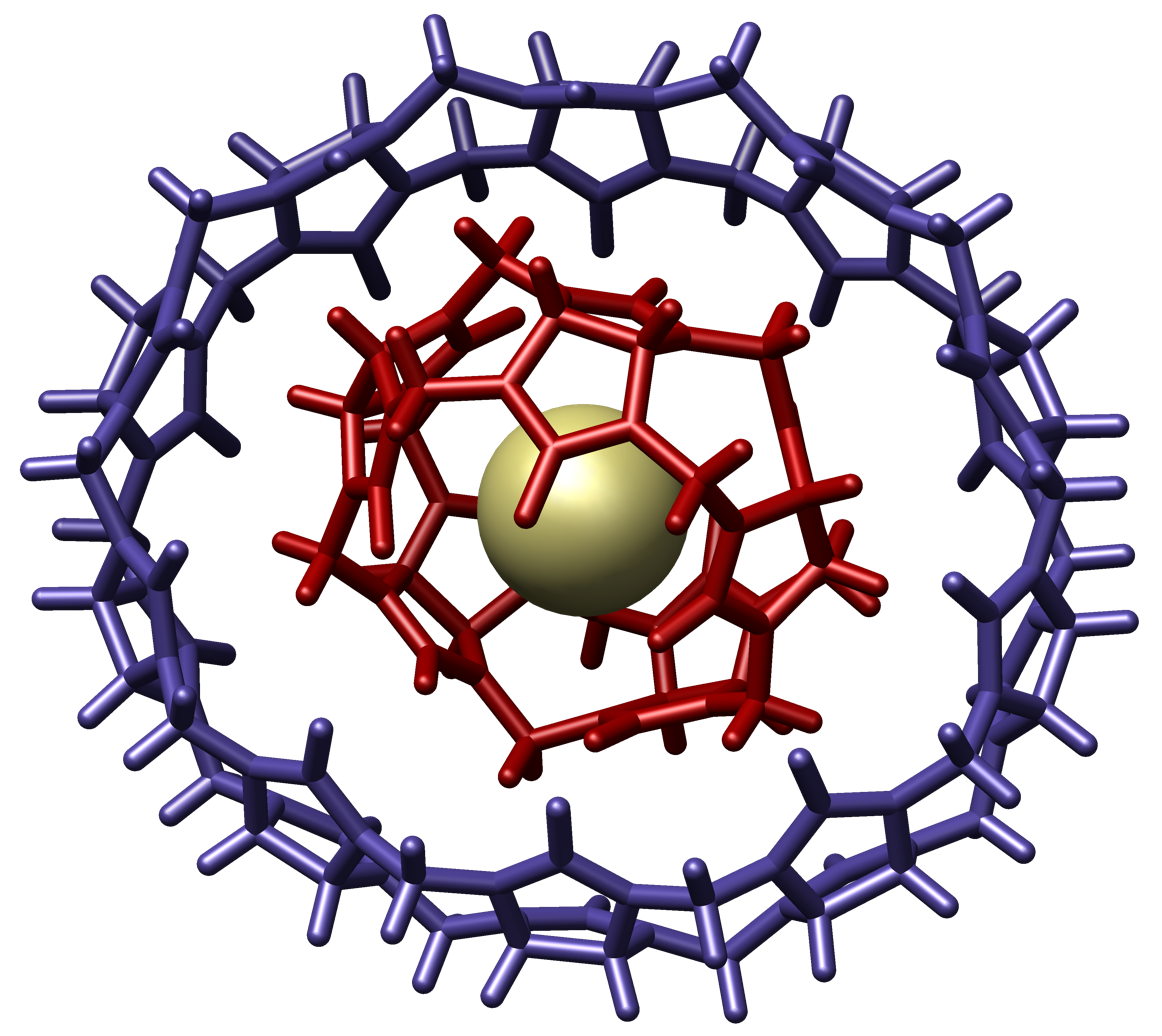
Supramolecular complex of a chloride ion (in yellow), cucurbit[5]uril (rotor, in red), and cucurbit[10]uril (stator, in purple), one of the first reported molecular gyroscopes

Molecular gyroscopes are chemical compounds or supramolecular complexes containing two or more concentric or co-axial portions that rotate freely compared to each other. They thus have a similar design to a gyroscope, with a rotor protected from outside influence by a surrounding stator. Though any single bond or triple bond permits a chemical group to freely rotate, the compounds described as gyroscopes may protect the rotor from interactions, such as in a crystal structure with low packing density or by physically surrounding the rotor avoiding steric contact. A qualitative distinction can be made based on whether the activation energy needed to overcome rotational barriers is higher than the available thermal energy. If the activation energy required is higher than the available thermal energy, the rotor undergoes "site exchange", jumping in discrete steps between local energy minima on the potential energy surface. If there is thermal energy sufficiently higher than that needed to overcome the barrier to rotation, the molecular rotor can behave more like a macroscopic freely rotating inertial mass.

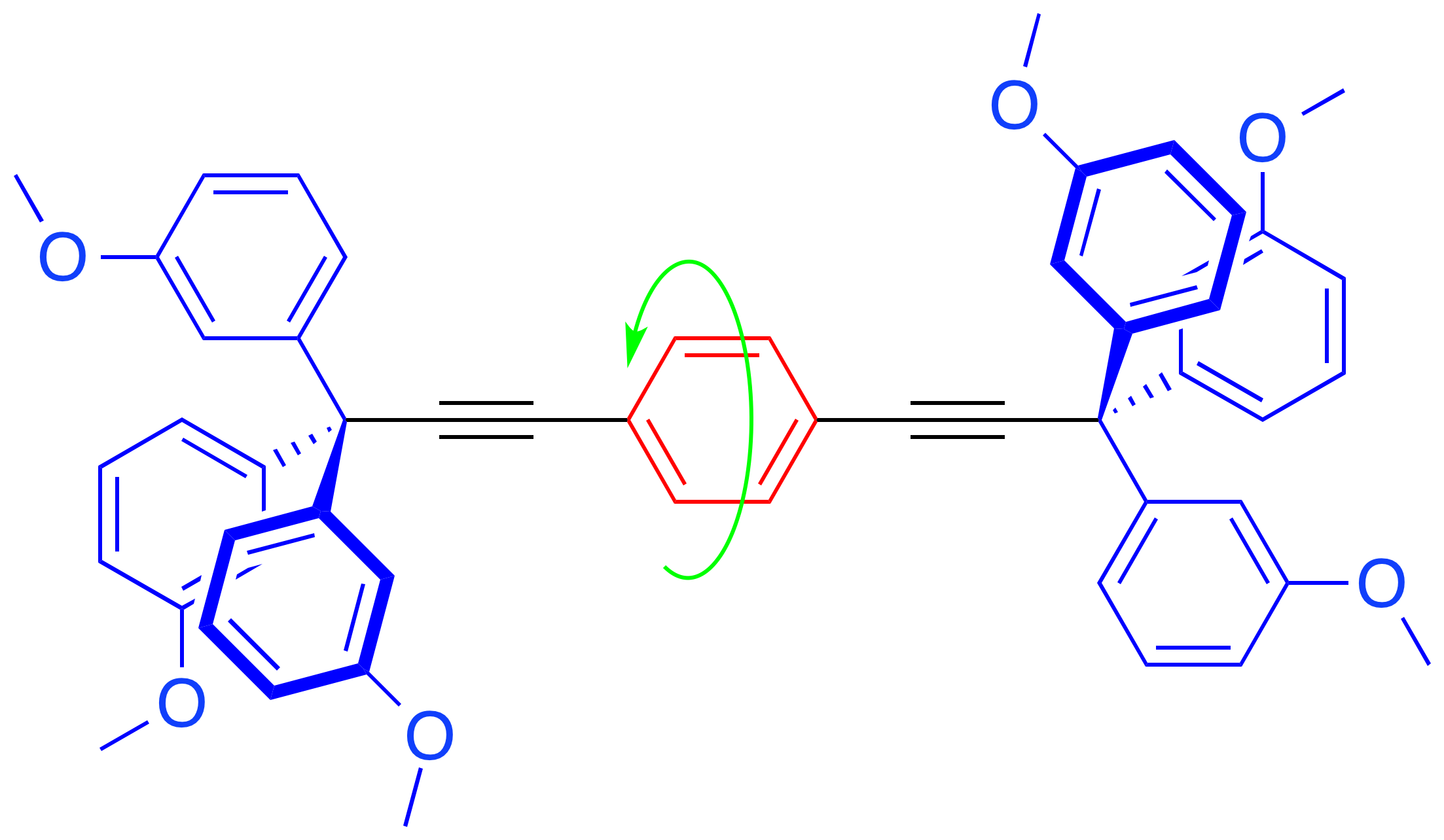
A p-Phenylene rotor (red) rotates on two acetylene (black) axles between two m-methoxy-substituted trityl stators (blue).

For example, several studies in 2002 with a p-phenylene rotor found that some structures using variable-temperature (VT) solid-state ^{13}C CPMAS and quadrupolar echo ^{2}H NMR were able to detect a two-site exchange rate of 1.6 MHz (over 10^{6}/second at 65 °C), described as "remarkably fast for a phenylene group in a crystalline solid", with steric barriers of 12–14 kcal/mol. However, tert-butyl modification of the rotor increased the exchange rate to over 10^{8} per second at room temperature, and the rate for inertially rotating p-phenylene without barriers is estimated to be approximately 2.4 trillion revolutions per second.

Year of publication	Rotor	Stator	Linkage	Reference
2002	cucurbit[5]uril	cucurbit[10]uril	noncovalent	
2007	p-phenylene	two m-methoxy-substituted trityl groups	triple bonds	
2007	p-phenylene	triply bridged trityl cage	triple bonds	
2010	halogen-substituted p-phenylene	silaalkane chains	single bonds	
2014	p-phenylene	trityl groups bridged by photoactive azobenzene bridge	triple bonds	
2015	H–Pt–H	two tri-tert-butylphosphine groups	Pt–P bonds	
