= Resorcinarene =

Ring molecule able to hold other molecules within itself

In chemistry, a resorcinarene (also resorcarene or calix[4]resorcinarene) is a macrocycle, or a cyclic oligomer, based on the condensation of resorcinol (1,3-dihydroxybenzene) and an aldehyde. Resorcinarenes are a type of calixarene. Other types of resorcinarenes include the related pyrogallolarenes and octahydroxypyridines, derived from pyrogallol and 2,6-dihydroxypyridine, respectively.

Resorcinarenes interact with other molecules forming a host–guest complex. Resorcinarenes and pyrogallolarenes self-assemble into larger supramolecular structures. Both in the crystalline state and in organic solvents, six resorcinarene molecules are known to form hexamers with an internal volume of around one cubic nanometer (nanocapsules) and shapes similar to the Archimedean solids. Hydrogen bonds appear to hold the assembly together. A number of solvent or other molecules reside inside. The resorcinarene is also the basic structural unit for other molecular recognition scaffolds, typically formed by bridging the phenolic oxygens with alkyl or aromatic spacers. A number of molecular structures are based on this macrocycle, namely cavitands and carcerands.

== Synthesis ==
The resorcinarenes are typically prepared by condensation of resorcinol and an aldehyde in acid solution. This reaction was first described by Adolf von Baeyer who described the condensation of resorcinol and benzaldehyde but was unable to elucidate the nature of the product(s). The methods have since been refined. Recrystallization typically gives the desired isomer in quite pure form. However, for certain aldehydes, the reaction conditions lead to significant by-products. Alternative condensation conditions have been developed, including the use of Lewis acid catalysts.

Preparation of resorcin[4]arenes from resorcinol and an aldehyde

A green chemistry procedure uses solvent-free conditions: resorcinol, an aldehyde, and p-toluenesulfonic acid are ground together in a mortar and pestle at low temperature.

== Structure ==
Resorcinarenes can be characterized by a wide upper rim and a narrow lower rim. The upper rim includes eight hydroxyl groups that can participate in hydrogen bonding interactions. Depending on the aldehyde starting material, the lower rim includes four appending groups, usually chosen to give optimal solubility. The resorcin[n]arene nomenclature is analogous to that of calix[n]arenes, in which 'n' represents the number of repeating units in the ring. Pyrogallolarenes are related macrocycles derived from the condensation of pyrogallol (1,2,3-trihydroxybenzene) with an aldehyde.

Resorcinarenes and pyrogallolarenes self-assemble to give supramolecular assemblies. Both in the crystalline state and in solution, they are known to form hexamers that are akin to certain Archimedean solids with an internal volume of around one cubic nanometer (nanocapsules). (Isobutylpyrogallol[4]arene)_{6} is held together by 48 intermolecular hydrogen bonds. The remaining 24 hydrogen bonds are intramolecular. The cavity is filled by solvent.

== Catalysis ==
The resorcinarene hexamer has been described as a yoctolitre reaction vessel. Within the confines of the container, terpene cyclizations and iminium catalyzed reactions have been observed.
