= Cucurbituril =

Ring molecule able to store other molecules within itself

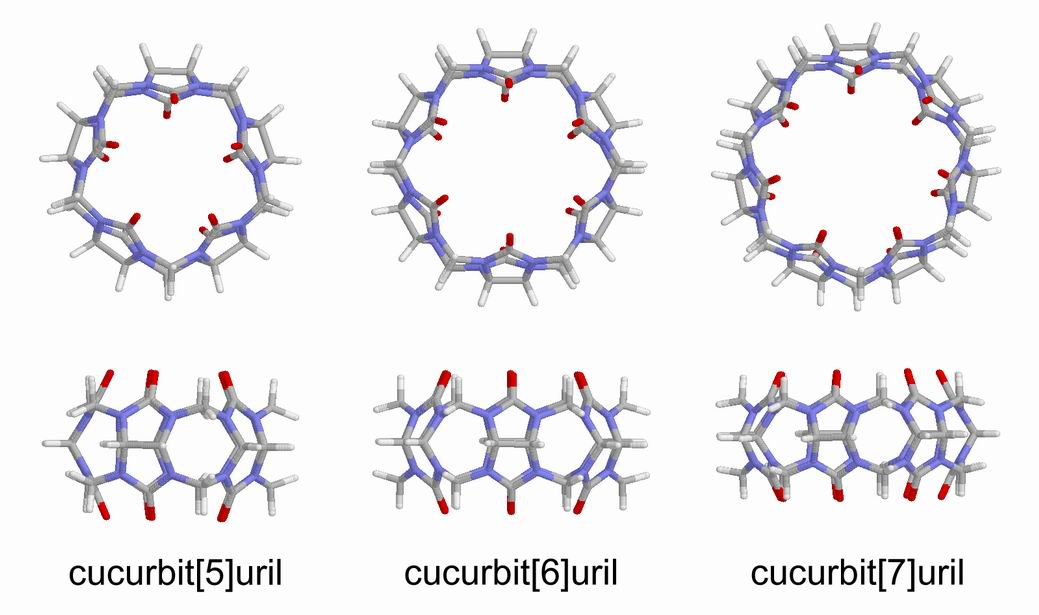
Computer models of CB[5], CB[6], and CB[7]. Top row is the view into the cavity and the bottom is the side view

In host–guest chemistry, cucurbiturils are macrocyclic molecules made of glycoluril (=C_{4}H_{2}N_{4}O_{2}=) monomers linked by methylene bridges (−CH_{2}−). The oxygen atoms are located along the edges of the band and are tilted inwards, forming a partly enclosed cavity (cavitand). The name is derived from the resemblance of this molecule with a pumpkin of the family of Cucurbitaceae.

Cucurbiturils are commonly written as cucurbit[n]uril, where n is the number of glycoluril units. Two common abbreviations are CB[n], or simply CBn.

These compounds are particularly interesting to chemists because they are suitable hosts for an array of neutral and cationic species. The binding mode is thought to occur through hydrophobic interactions, and, in the case of cationic guests, through cation-dipole interactions as well. The dimensions of cucurbiturils are generally on the ~10 Å size scale. For instance, the cavity of cucurbit[6]uril has a height ~9.1 Å, an outer diameter ~5.8 Å, and an inner diameter ~3.9 Å.

Cucurbiturils were first synthesized in 1905 by Robert Behrend, by condensing glycoluril with formaldehyde, but their structure was not elucidated until 1981. The field expanded as CB5, CB7, and CB8 were discovered and isolated by Kim Kimoon in the year 2000. To date cucurbiturils composed of 5, 6, 7, 8, 10, and 14 repeat units have all been isolated, which have internal cavity volumes of 82, 164, 279, 479, and 870 Å^{3} respectively. A cucurbituril composed of 9 repeat units has yet to be isolated (as of 2009). Other common molecular capsules that share a similar molecular shape with cucurbiturils include cyclodextrins, calixarenes, and pillararenes.

== Synthesis ==
Cucurbituril synthesis

Cucurbiturils are amidals (less precisely aminals) and synthesized from urea 1 and a dialdehyde (e.g., glyoxal 2) via a nucleophilic addition to give the intermediate glycoluril 3. This intermediate is condensed with formaldehyde to give hexamer cucurbit[6]uril above 110 °C. Ordinarily, multifunctional monomers such as 3 would undergo a step-growth polymerization that would give a distribution of products, but due to favorable strain and an abundance of hydrogen bonding, the hexamer is the only reaction product isolated after precipitation.

Decreasing the temperature of the reaction to between 75 and 90 °C can be used to access other sizes of cucurbiturils including CB[5], CB[7], CB[8], and CB[10]. CB[6] is still the major product; the other ring sizes are formed in smaller yields. The isolation of sizes other than CB[6] requires fractional crystallization and dissolution. CB[5], CB[6], CB[7], and CB[8] are all currently commercially available. The larger sizes are a particularly active area of research since they can bind larger and more interesting guest molecules, thus expanding their potential applications.

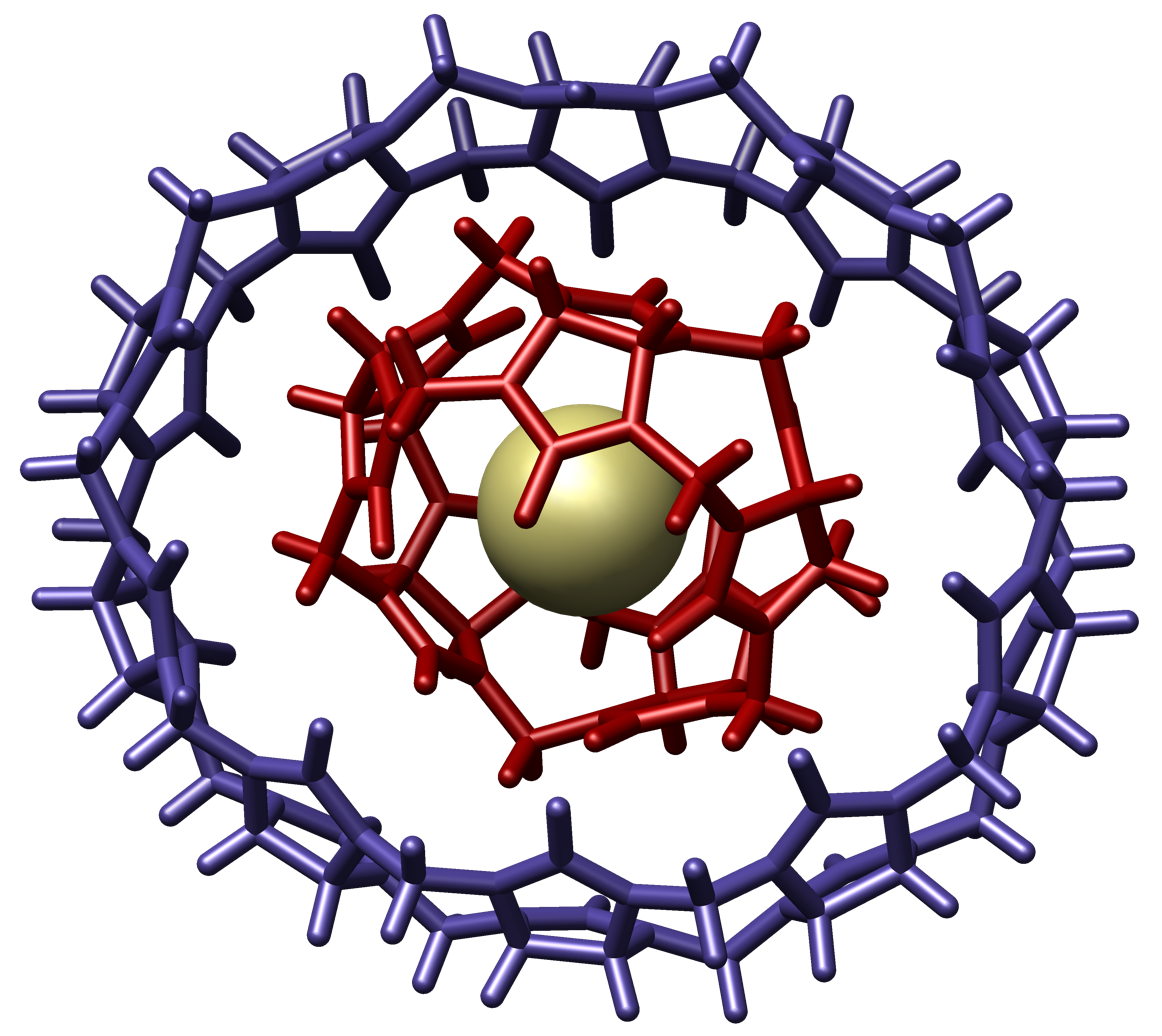
Crystal structure of the CB[10]·CB[5] complex including a chloride anion

Cucurbit[10]uril is particularly difficult to isolate. It was first discovered by Day and coworkers in 2002 as an inclusion complex containing CB[5] by fractional crystallization of the cucurbituril reaction mixture. The CB[10]·CB[5] was unambiguously identified by single crystal X-ray structural analysis that revealed the complex resembled a molecular gyroscope. In this case, the free rotation of the CB[5] within the CB[10] cavity mimics the independent rotation of a flywheel within the frame of a gyroscope.

Isolation of pure CB[10] could not be accomplished by direct separation methods since the compound has such a high affinity for CB[5]. The strong binding affinity for the CB[5] can be understood since it has a complementary size and shape to the cavity of the CB[10]. Pure CB[10] was isolated by Isaacs and coworkers in 2005 by introducing a more strongly binding melamine diamine guest that is capable of displacing the CB[5]. The melamine diamine guest was then separated from the CB[10] by reaction with acetic anhydride that converted the positively charged amine groups to neutrally charged amides. Cucurbiturils strongly bind cationic guests, but by removing the positive charge from the melamine diamine guest reduces the association constant to the point it can be removed by washing with methanol, DMSO, and water. The CB[10] has an unusually large cavity (870 Å^{3}) that's free and capable of binding extraordinarily large guests including a cationic calix[4]arene.

== Supramolecular chemistry ==
Cucurbiturils have been examined heavily with the goals including drug delivery, asymmetric synthesis, molecular switching, and dye tuning. None of these activities achieved commercialization.

=== Supramolecular host molecules ===
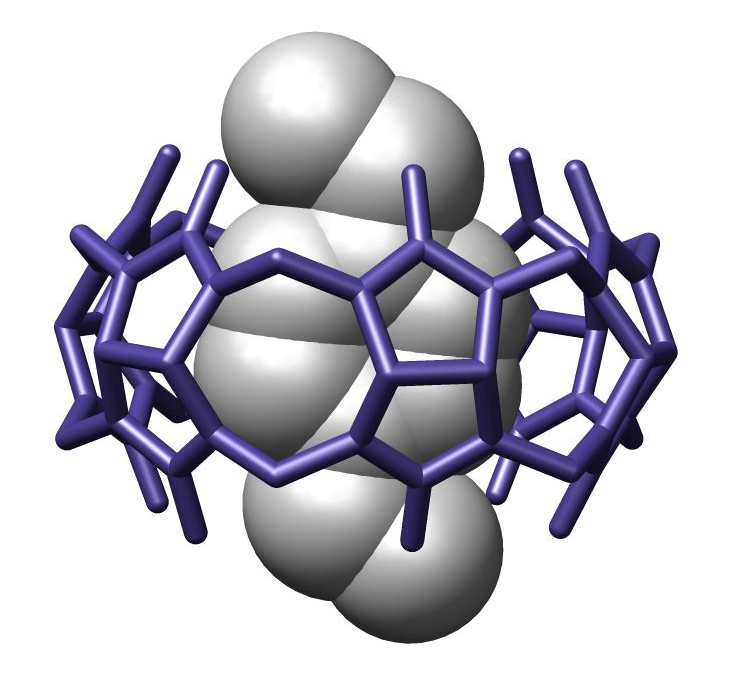
Crystal structure of a host–guest complex with a p-xylylenediammonium bound within a cucurbit[6]uril

Cucurbiturils are efficient host molecules in molecular recognition and have a particularly high affinity for positively charged or cationic compounds. High association constants with positively charged molecules are attributed to the carbonyl groups that line each end of the cavity and can interact with cations in a similar fashion to crown ethers. The affinity of cucurbiturils can be very high. For example, the affinity equilibrium constant of cucurbit[7]uril with the positively charged 1-aminoadamantane hydrochloride is experimentally determined at 4.23*10^{12}.

Although cucurbit[6]uril dissolves poorly in just about any solvent but its inclusion complexes are quite soluble. The cavitand forms a positively charged inclusion compound with a potassium ion or a hydronium ion respectively which have much greater solubility than the uncomplexed neutral molecule.

Cucurbituril's host–guest properties have been explored for drug delivery vehicles. The potential of this application has been explored with cucurbit[7]uril that forms an inclusion compound with the important cancer fighting drug oxaliplatin. CB[7] was employed despite the fact that it is more difficult to isolate since it has much greater solubility in water and its larger cavity size can accommodate the drug molecule. The resulting complex was found to have increased stability and greater selectivity that may lead to fewer side effects.

=== Rotaxane macrocycles ===
Cucurbiturils have been employed as the macrocycles component of a rotaxane. After formation of the supramolecular assembly or threaded complex with a guest molecule such as hexamethylene diamine the two ends of the guest can be reacted with bulky groups that will then act as a "stoppers", preventing the two separate molecules from dissociating.

In another rotaxane system with a CB[7] "wheel", the axle is a 4,4'-bipyridinium or viologen subunit with two carboxylic acid terminated aliphatic N-substituents at both ends. In water at concentration higher than 0.5 mM complexation is quantitative without need of stoppers. At pH = 2 the carboxylic end-groups are protonated and the wheel shuttles back and forth between them as evidenced by the presence of just two aromatic viologen protons in the proton NMR spectrum. At pH = 9 the wheel is locked around the viologen center.

=== Supramolecular catalysts ===
Cucurbiturils have also been explored as supramolecular catalysts. Larger cucurbiturils, such as cucurbit[8]uril can bind multiple guest molecules. CB[8] forms a complex 2:1 (guest:host) with (E)-diaminostilbene dihydrochloride which is accommodated by CB[8]'s larger internal diameter of 8.8 angstrom and height 9.1 angstrom. The close proximity and optimal orientation of the guest molecules within the cavity enhances the rate of the photochemical cyclization to give cyclobutane dimer with a 19:1 stereoselectivity for the syn configuration when bound to CB[8]. In the absence of CB[8] the cyclization reaction does not occur, but only the isomerization of the trans isomer to the cis isomer is observed.

== Related compounds ==
Inverted cucurbiturils or iCB[x] are CB analogues with one glycoluril repeating unit inverted. In this unit the methine protons actually point into the cavity and this makes the cavity less spacious. Inverted cucurbiturils form as a side-product in CB-forming reactions, with yields between 2 and 0.4%. Isolation of this type of CB compound is possible because it is more difficult to form inclusion compounds that ordinarily form with regular CBs. Inverted cucurbiturils are believed to be the kinetically controlled reaction products because the heating of iCB[6] in acidic medium results in a mixture of CB[5], CB[6] and CB[7] in a 24:13:1 ratio.

A cucurbituril cut in half along the equator is called a hemicucurbituril.

== Systematic name ==
Cucurbit[6]uril's systematic name is dodecahydro-1H,4H,14H,17H-2,16:3,15-dimethano-5H,6H,7H,8H,9H,10H,11H,12H,13H,18H,19H,20H,21H,22H,23H,24H,25H,26H-2,3,4a,5a,6a,7a,8a,9a,10a,11a,12a,13a,15,16,17a,18a,19a,20a,21a,22a,23a,24a,25a,26a-tetracosaazabispentaleno[1''',6''':5'',6'',7'']cyclooctyl[1'',2'',3'':3',4']pentaleno(1',6':5,6,7)-cycloocta(1,2,3-gh:1',2',3'-g'h')cycloocta(1,2,3-cd:5,6,7-c'd')dipentalene-1,4,6,8,10,12,14,17,19,21,23,25-dodecone.
