= Hemicucurbituril =

A hemicucurbituril is a macrocycle composed of alternating methylene bridges (−CH_{2}− units) and N-substituted ethylene urea units. Hemicucurbit[6]uril is a hexamer. This compound closely resembles cucurbituril cut in half along the equator and the chemistry is also similar. The ethylene urea units also alternate with the carbonyl groups assuming alternating up and down positions. For this reason this compound contrary to cucurbituril is unable to form inclusion compounds with metal ions.

The compound is formed by reaction of ethylene urea with a 37% solution of formalin and hydrochloric acid in a sequence of Mannich reactions. The success of the reaction critically depends on the acid concentration, which is why the discovery of the compound took until 2004. A crystalline product settles out of the solution which is the inclusion compound of Hemicucurbituril with water or HCl. These guests can be driven out by application of elevated temperature and a vacuum. With tweaking of the reaction conditions the hemicucurbit[12]uril (n = 6) is also obtained.

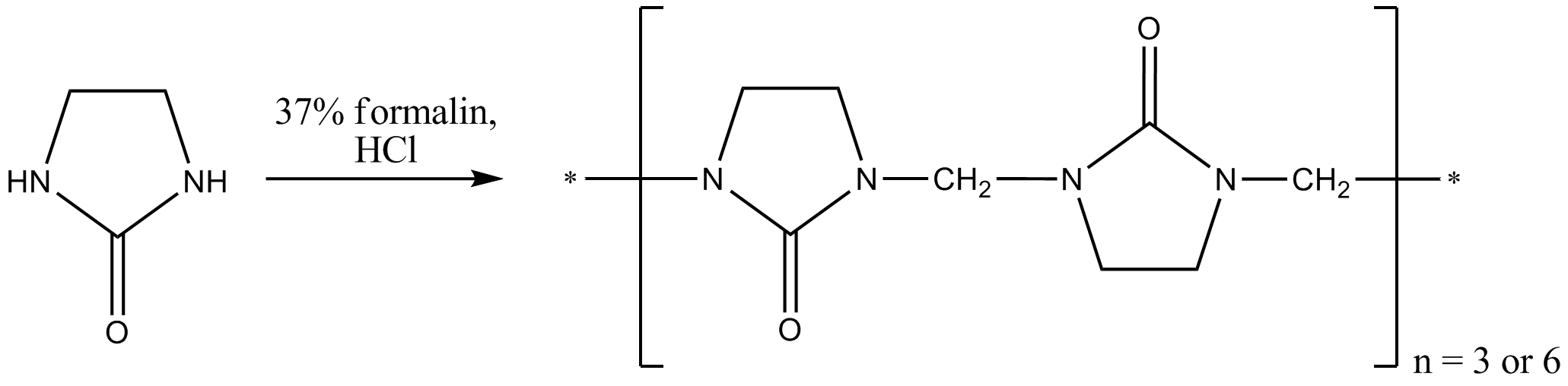
