= Potentiometric titration =

Measuring electric potential of a solution as titrant is added

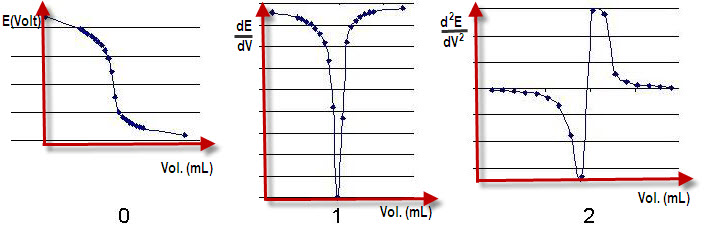
Measurements, first and second derivative in a potentiometric titration.

In analytical chemistry, potentiometric titration is a technique similar to direct titration of a redox reaction. It is a useful means of characterizing an acid. No indicator is used; instead, the electric potential is measured across the analyte, typically an electrolyte solution. To do this, two electrodes are used, an indicator electrode (the glass electrode and metal ion indicator electrode) and a reference electrode. Reference electrodes generally used are hydrogen electrodes, calomel electrodes, and silver chloride electrodes. This reference electrode forms an electrochemical half-cell, typically serving as the anode. The indicator electrode forms the other half-cell with the ions of interest in the test solution.

The overall electric potential is calculated as

$$E_{\rm cell} = E_{\rm ind} - E_{\rm ref} + E_{\rm sol}.$$

E_{sol} is the potential drop over the test solution between the two electrodes due to differences in ion diffusion rates across the salt bridge, which is typically negligible. E_{cell} is recorded at intervals as the titrant is added. A graph of potential against volume added can be drawn and the end point of the reaction is when the jump in voltage is observed, similar to other types of titrations. E_{cell} depends on the concentration of the ions of interest with which the indicator electrode is in contact. For example, the electrode reaction may be

$$\ce{M}^{n+} + n\ \ce{e- -> M}$$

As the concentration of M^{n+} changes, the E_{cell} changes correspondingly according to the Nernst equation. Thus the potentiometric titration involve measurement of E_{cell} with the addition of titrant. Types of potentiometric titration include acid–base titration (total alkalinity and total acidity), redox titration, precipitation titration, and complexometric titration (e.g. free EDTA).

== History ==
The first potentiometric titration was carried out in 1893 by Robert Behrend at Ostwald's Institute in Leipzig. He titrated mercurous solution with potassium chloride, potassium bromide, and potassium iodide. He used a mercury electrode along with a mercury/mercurous nitrate reference electrode. He found that in a cell composed of mercurous nitrate and mercurous nitrate/mercury, the initial voltage is 0. If potassium chloride is added to mercurous nitrate on one side, mercury (I) chloride is precipitated. This decreased the osmotic pressure of mercury (I) ions on the side and creates a potential difference. This potential difference increases slowly as additional potassium chloride is added, but then increases more rapidly. He found the greatest potential difference is achieved once all of the mercurous nitrate has been precipitated. This was used to discern end points of titrations.

Wilhelm Böttger then developed the tool of potentiometric titration while working at Ostwald's Institute. He used potentiometric titration to observe the differences in titration between strong and weak acids, as well as the behavior of polybasic acids. He introduced the idea of using potentiometric titrations for acids and bases that could not be titrated in conjunction with a colorimetric indicator

Potentiometric titrations were first used for redox titrations by Crotogino. He titrated halide ions with potassium permanganate using a shiny platinum electrode and a calomel electrode. He said that if an oxidizing agent is added to a reducing solution then the equilibrium between the reducing substance and reaction product will shift towards the reaction product. This changes the potential very slowly until the amount of reducing substance becomes very small. A large change in potential will occur then once a small addition of the titrating solution is added, as the final amounts of reducing agent are removed and the potential corresponds solely to the oxidizing agent. This large increase in potential difference signifies the endpoint of the reaction.

== See also ==
- Chronoamperometry
- Electroanalytical methods
