= Robert Behrend =

German chemist (1856–1926)

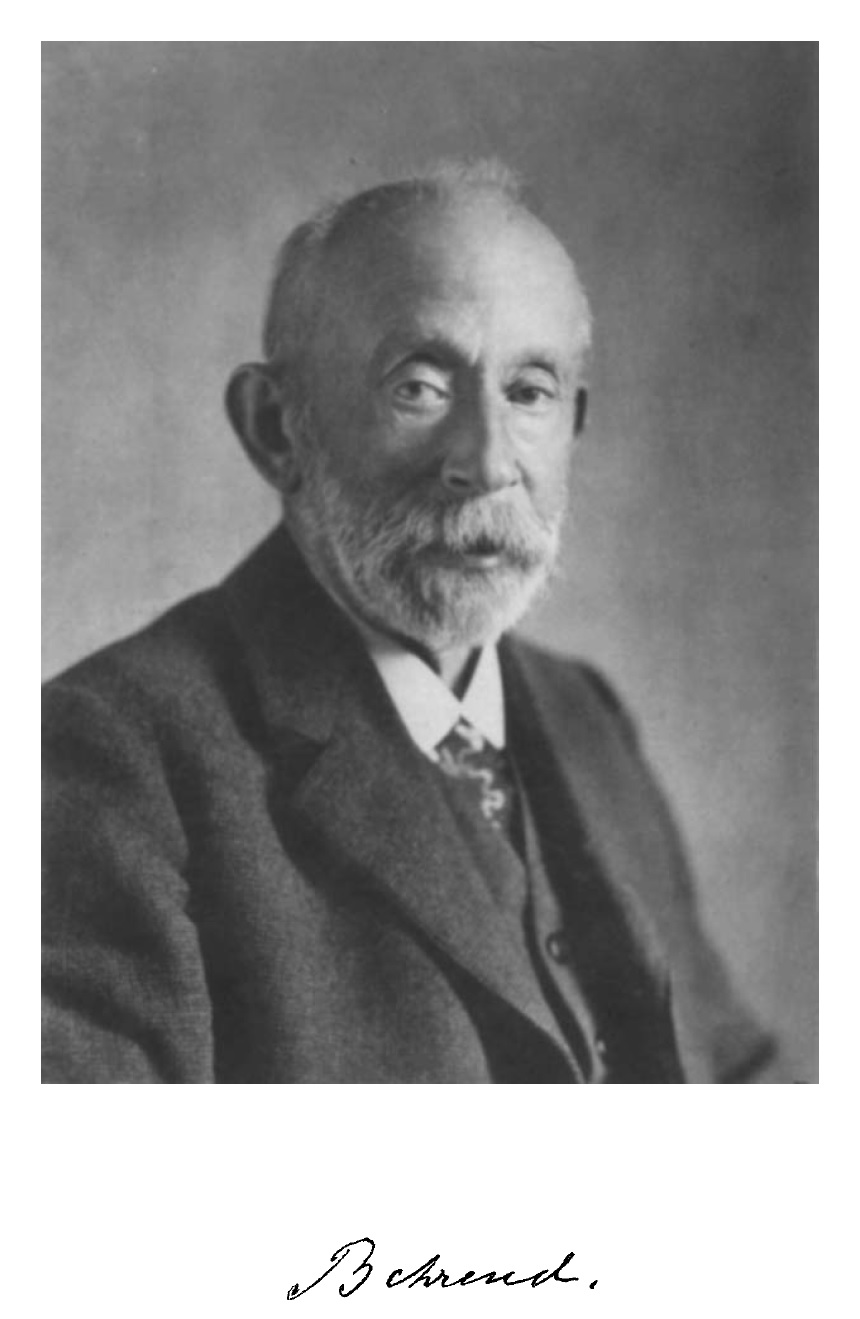
- Behrend, c. 1925
- Born: Anton Friedrich Robert Behrend; 17 December 1856; Harburg, Free and Hanseatic City of Hamburg
- Died: 15 September 1926 (aged 69); Hannover, Germany
- Known for: Conductometry; Potentiometric titration Synthesis of cucurbituril and uric acid
- Scientific career
- Fields: Organic chemistry Stereochemistry
- Institutions: Leibniz University Hannover

Anton Friedrich Robert Behrend (17 December 1856 – 15 September 1926) was a German analytical organic chemist who made pioneering studies of stereochemistry and isomerism. He was also the first to synthesize uric acid and introduced potentiometric titration. The Behrend rearrangement reaction of nitrones is named after him.

Behrend was born in Harburg to Karl, a trader and his wife Louise Elisabeth Margarethe Carol née Himbeck. He grew up in Hamburg. He joined the infantry regiment in 1876 and studied law for some time and then shifted to physics under Emil Gabriel Warburg. In 1877 and 1878, he tried to study chemistry at Leipzig under Herman Kolbe but was not accepted as he knew nothing. He then worked under Gustav Heinrich Wiedemann and received a doctorate in organic chemistry in 1881. He became a professor in 1889 and in 1897, he moved to the Technical College of Hannover working on stereochemistry. He was among the first to synthesize uric acid, and cucurbiturils. He was a fit and keen outdoors person but his health declined from 1922 and he retired in 1924. He died during a typhoid outbreak in 1926.

Behrend married Elizabeth Tischendorf in 1886 and they had a son and three daughters, one of whom was the photographer Katharina Eleonore Behrend (1888–1973).
