= Conductometry =

Measurement of the electrolytic conductivity to measure reaction progress

Conductometry is a measurement of electrolytic conductivity to monitor a progress of chemical reaction. Conductometry has notable application in analytical chemistry, where it is a standard technique. In usual analytical chemistry practice, the term conductometry is used as a synonym of conductometric titration while the term conductimetry is used to describe non-titrative applications. Conductometry is often applied to determine the total conductance of a solution or to analyze the end point of titrations that include ions.

== History ==
Conductive measurements began as early as the 18th century, when Andreas Baumgartner noticed that salt and mineral waters from Bad Gastein in Austria conducted electricity. As such, using conductometry to determine water purity, which is often used today to test the effectiveness of water purification systems, began in 1776. Friedrich Kohlrausch further developed conductometry in the 1860s when he applied alternating current to water, acids, and other solutions. It was also around this time when Willis Whitney, who was studying the interactions of sulfuric acid and chromium sulfate complexes, found the first conductometric endpoint. These finding culminated into potentiometric titrations and the first instrument for volumetric analysis by Robert Behrend in 1883 while titrating chloride and bromide with HgNO_{3}. This development allowed for testing the solubility of salts and hydrogen ion concentration, as well as acid/base and redox titrations. Conductometry was further improved with the development of the glass electrode, which began in 1909.

== Titration ==
Conductometric titration is a type of titration in which the electrolytic conductivity of the reaction mixture is continuously monitored as one reactant is added. The equivalence point is the point at which the conductivity undergoes a sudden change. Marked increase or decrease in conductance are associated with the changing concentrations of the two most highly conducting ions—the hydrogen and hydroxyl ions. The method can be used for titrating coloured solutions or homogeneous suspension (e.g.: wood pulp suspension), which cannot be used with normal indicators.

Acid-base titrations and redox titrations are often performed in which common indicators are used to locate the end point e.g., methyl orange, phenolphthalein for acid base titrations and starch solutions for iodometric type redox process. However, electrical conductance measurements can also be used as a tool to locate the end point.

Example: titration of an HCl solution with the strong base NaOH. As the titration progresses, the protons are neutralized to form water by the addition of NaOH. For each amount of NaOH added equivalent amount of hydrogen ions is removed. Effectively, the mobile H^{+} cation is replaced by the less-mobile Na^{+} ion, and the conductivity of the titrated solution as well as the measured conductance of the cell fall. This continues until the equivalence point is reached, at which one obtains a solution of sodium chloride, NaCl. If more base is added, an increase in conductivity or conductance is observed, since more ions Na^{+} and OH^{−} are being added and the neutralization reaction no longer removes an appreciable amount of H^{+}. Consequently, in the titration of a strong acid with a strong base, the conductance has a minimum at the equivalence point. This minimum can be used, instead of an indicator dye, to determine the endpoint of the titration. The conductometric titration curve is a plot of the measured conductance or conductivity values as a function of the volume of the NaOH solution added. The titration curve can be used to graphically determine the equivalence point.

For reaction between a weak acid and a weak base in the beginning conductivity decreases a bit as the few available H^{+} ions are used up. Then conductivity increases slightly up to the equivalence point volume, due to contribution of the salt cation and anion of the weak acid as it is formed from $\ce{OH-}$ and the neutral acid (This changing contribution in case of a strong acid-strong base does not occur as in strong acids the anion is present all the time). After the equivalence point is achieved the conductivity flattens as by adding more weak base to a solution containing its conjugated acid a buffer is formed and extra added weak base in essence will stay in that form.

== See also ==
Molar conductivity
