= Katharina Behrend =

German-born Dutch photographer

Katharina Eleonore Behrend (July 22, 1888 – November 15, 1973) was a German-born Dutch photographer who is remembered for her work in a wide variety of photographic genres including a nude self-portrait.

== Biography ==
Born in Leipzig, she grew up in a well-to-do family as the daughter of Robert Behrend, a chemistry professor, later moving to Hanover. She carefully recorded the photographs she took from 1904 with her father's 9 × 12 cm camera, noting shutter-speed, aperture, location and the names of the people photographed.

Behrend's work is archived at the Nederlands Fotomuseum in Rotterdam. The images from 1904 to 1913 cover the time the family lived in Hanover while those from 1913 to 1929 cover her life in the Netherlands after she married Arie Haentjens, director of the steam engine factory in Leiden. In 1930, when she started using a Zeiss Ikon Ikonta, she stopped keeping detailed records.

Some 900 negatives by Behrend are kept in the museum. In addition to photographs of family and friends, there are views of Algeria (1905–06), including the temple ruins at Timgad, and of her husband's factory (1913–1915). There are also nude photographs of herself and her friends (1910–11) at a time when she supported the German Freikörperkultur movement.
