= Pillararene =

Ring molecule able to store other molecules within itself

Pillararenes are macrocycles composed of hydroquinone or dialkoxybenzene units (5 to 10) linked in the para position by methylene bridges. They are structurally similar to the cucurbiturils and calixarenes that play an important part in host–guest chemistry. The first pillararene was the five membered dimethoxypillar[5]arene.

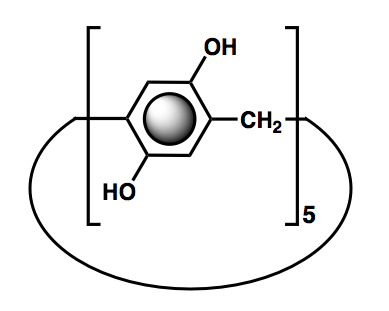
Chemical structure of pillar[5]arene

== History ==
1,4-Dimethoxypillar[5]arene, the first pillararene, was reported in 2008 by Tomoki Ogoshi et al. They catalyzed the condensation of 1,4-dimethoxybenzene and paraformaldehyde using a Lewis acid to obtain 1,4-dimethoxypillar[5]arene (DMpillar[5]arene). The methoxy groups of DMpillar[5]arene were then deprotected using boron tribromide and removed to give pillar[5]arene. Ogoshi and Kanai decided naming the new family of host macrocycles "pillararene", since they are cylindrical or pillar-like in shape and composed of aromatic or "arene" moieties. Chemists often refer to them as "pillarenes" orally as this is easier to pronounce and remember. It is pertinent to mention that Rathore and Kochi first observed pillararenes in 1995, but were unable to characterize, and reported as a polymer-like material being formed along with diarylmethanes during the transformation of bis(methoxymethyl)-p-hydroquinone ether.

== Structure ==
Pillararenes are composed of hydroquinone units linked by methylene bridges at para-positions. It features a symmetrical pillar architecture with two identical cavity gates. Pillar[5]arene is the most conformationally stable member in this family. Due to the close proximity of many electron-rich hydroquinones, the cavity of pillararenes are able to form strong association complexes with electron-poor species. Also, derivatives of the pillararenes can be generated by modifying the hydroxyl groups at all positions or selectively on one or two positions.

=== Planar chirality ===
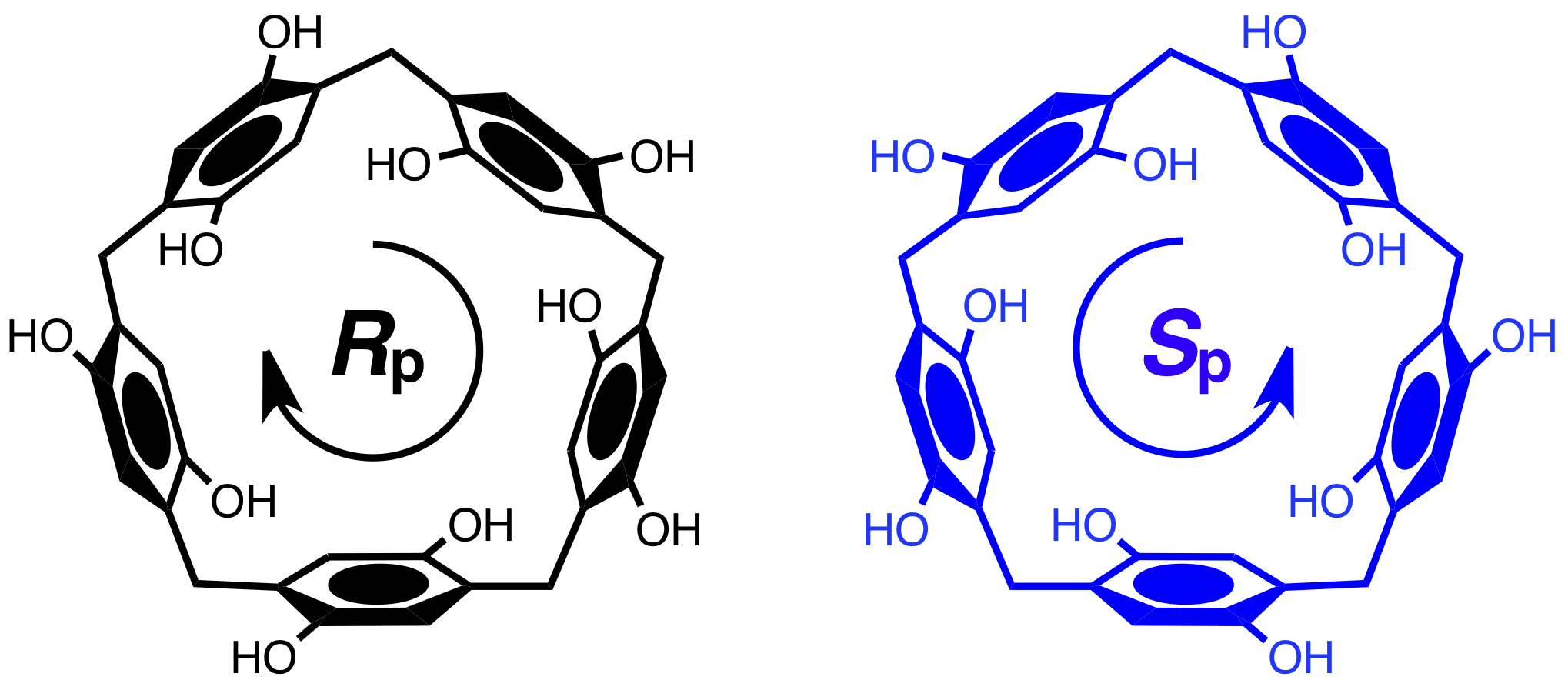
Enantiomers of Pillar[5]arene

The orientation of the hydroquinone oxygens on both rims of the pillararene allow the macrocycle to exhibit planar chirality. When the substituent on the hydroquinone oxygen is small enough to fit through the cavity of the pillararene, allowing for oxygen-through-the-annulus rotation to occur, racemization occurs. If this substituent is large enough to prevent rotation, optically active pillararene macrocycles can be isolated.

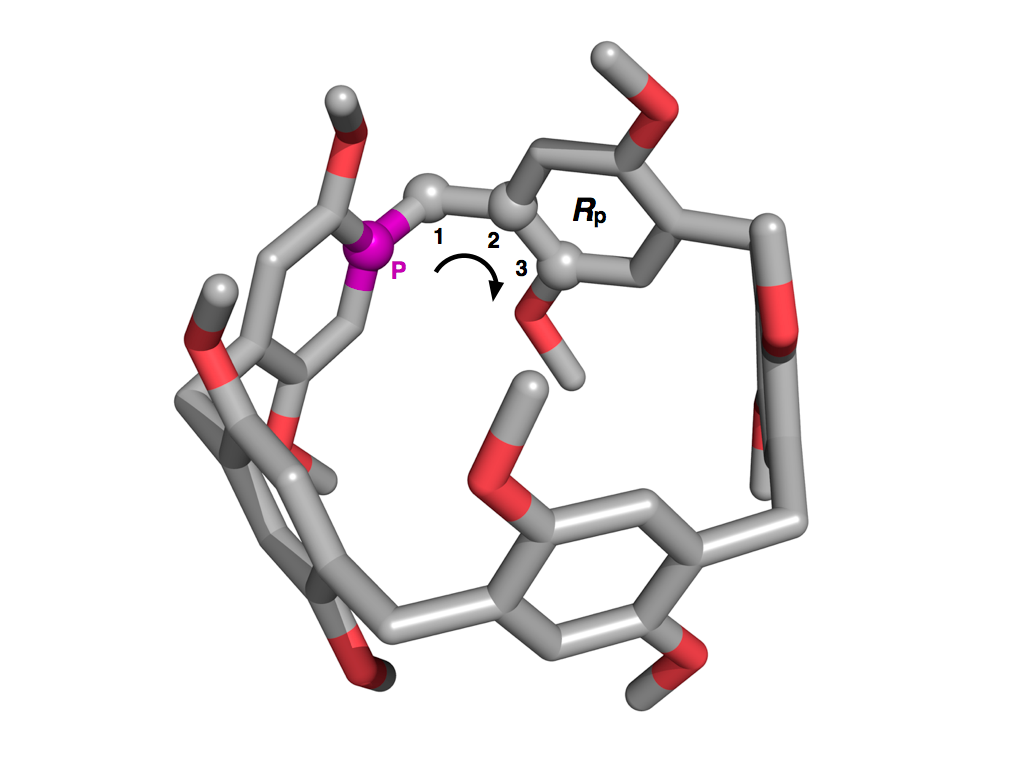
Assignment of the absolute stereochemical designation of one hydroquinone unit of planar chiral DMpillar[5]arene. The pilot atom is shown in purple, and the three atoms used to assign the absolute stereochemistry are labeled and shown as spheres.

A pillar[n]arene macrocycle, with n hydroquinone units, has n planes of chirality. DMpillar[5]arene has five planes of chirality which are "in sync" in the lowest energy conformational isomer due to unfavorable steric interactions between the methoxy groups of neighboring 1,4-dimethoxy-phenylene units. The absolute stereochemical designation of these planes of chirality in pillararene structures can be assigned following modified Cahn-Ingold-Prelog priority rules. The pilot atom for one of the five planes of chirality in pillar[5]arene is assigned to the highest priority atom that is not in the chiral plane - the first carbon atom of the neighboring phenylene unit. The three adjacent in-plane atoms are then assigned, starting with the methylene carbon attached to the pilot atom as priority 1, and the directly connected phenylene carbon as 2, and the carbon atom connected to the methoxy group as 3. When viewed from the side of the pilot atom, if the three atoms form a clockwise direction when followed in order of priority, the molecule is assigned as R(p), otherwise it is assigned as S(p).

== Synthesis ==
=== Homopillararenes ===
Three strategies are mainly used to obtain pillararenes (Scheme 1). All of three strategies use an acid as catalyst.

1. The Lewis acid or trifluoromethanesulfonic acid catalyzed condensation of 1,4-dialkoxybenzene and paraformaldehyde at room temperature.
2. The condensation of 1,4-dialkoxy-2,5bis(alkoxymethyl)benzene catalyzed by p-toluenesulfonic acid.
3. Cyclooligomerization of 2,5-dialkoxybenzyl alcohols or 2,5-dialkoxybenzyl bromides with an appropriate Lewis acid as the catalyst.

=== Copillararenes ===
In 2010, Feihe Huang et al. introduced three new ways to synthesize copillararenes, which are composed of different repeating units. It is easier to selectively functionalize copillararenes, helping to generate interesting physical properties, conformations, and host–guest binding interactions. There are two possible ways to make copillararenes: to selectively modify repeating monomers of homopillararenes, or to use two different monomers to carry out co-oligomerization.

=== Mechanism ===
Pillararenes are traditionally formed through a thermodynamically controlled Friedel-Crafts cyclooligomerization. A practical and effective trifluoromethanesulfonic acid (TfOH)-catalyzed cyclooligomerization strategy was also developed for the synthesis of functionalized pillar[n]arenes and copillar[5]arenes from 1,4-dialkoxybenzenes with paraformaldehyde under mild reaction conditions, and the reaction mechanism of solution-phase catalytic synthesis of pillararenes was investigated by room-temperature X-band ESR spectroscopy, mass spectroscopy, NMR and control experiments, suggesting a free radical process initially and a Friedel–Crafts alkylation process during the consequent coupling and ring-closure stage.

=== Selective Synthesis of Pillar[6]arene ===
Pillar[6]arene can be targeted as the major product of the Friedel-Crafts cyclooligomerization by using bulky alkoxy groups on the monomer, switching the Lewis acid catalyst or by using a bulky chlorinated solvent. Ogoshi and coworkers reported the synthesis of a pillar[6]arene with 1,4-Bis(methylcyclohexyl ether)phenylene units in an 87% yield by using chlorocyclohexane as the solvent. The bulky chlorinated solvent was suggested to act as a template for the formation of the larger pillar[n]arene.

=== Higher Pillar[n]arenes ===
The higher pillar[n]arene homologues, pillar[6-15]arene, have been synthesized through the ring expansion of pillar[5]arene.

== Biomedical applications ==
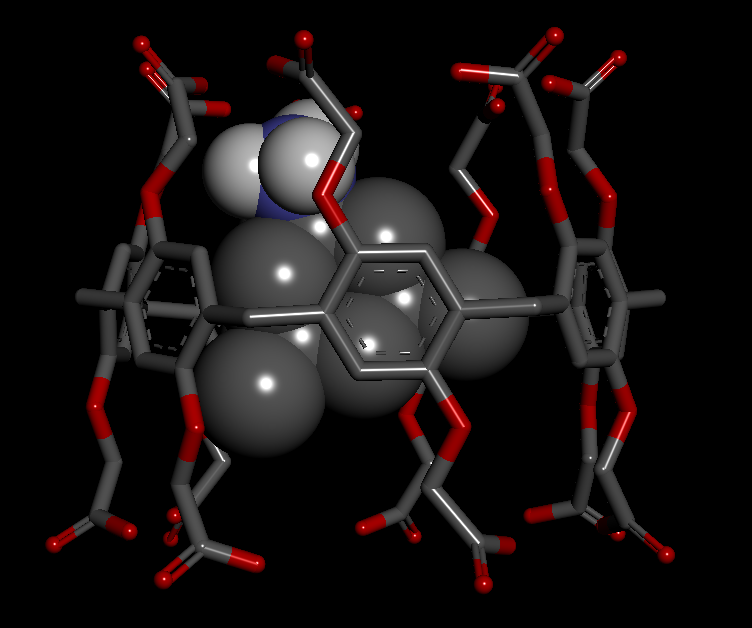
A molecular model of carboxylated-pillar[7]arene with the anti-Alzheimer drug memantine, showing the total encapsulation of the drug within the macrocycle's cavity. The host–guest complex is stabilized by hydrophobic effects within the cavity, hydrogen bonding, and electrostatic interactions.

While native pillar[n]arenes display no solubility in water, and are therefore unsuitable for biomedical applications, a range of water-soluble pillar[n]arenes have been reported which have application in drug delivery. In particular, water-soluble carboxylated-pillar[n]arenes (where n = 6 or 7) have already shown potential in both drug delivery and bio-diagnostics because they are highly soluble, form host–guest complexes with a range of drug and medicine-based compounds, and appear to be relatively non-toxic. The cavity of carboxylated-pillar[5]arene is too small to include most drug molecules and therefore is not useful in drug delivery. To form a host–guest complex with the pillar[n]arenes, the drug must have a cationic charge; its ability to hydrogen-bond with the pillar[n]arenes is less important. Two planar dye molecules, like proflavine, can be simultaneously encapsulated within the cavity of a single caboxylated-pillar[7]arene. Because encapsulation within the cavity of carboxylated-pillar[6]arene quenches the fluorescence of proflavine, this gives rise to "on" and "off' states to the dye which may have application in bio-diagnostics.

== Other potential applications ==
Pillar[n]arenes have been shown to have potential applications in molecular machinery, sensing, nanoparticle synthesis, artificial transmembrane channels, as components in complex, supramolecular controlled drug delivery systems, construction of porous materials for gas/guest absorption, organic light-emitting materials, and ionic liquids. Binding with dibromoalkanes.

Researchers at Jilin University have reported that a percarboxylated derivative of pillar[5]arene inhibits the assembly of the human papillomavirus.

Pillar[5]arene shows promise in overcoming the development of antimicrobial resistance and biofilm formation as well as reducing the toxicity of bacterial endotoxins (lipopolysaccharides).
