= Supramolecular chemistry =

Branch of chemistry

Supramolecular chemistry is the branch of chemistry concerning chemical systems composed of discrete numbers of molecules. The strength of the forces responsible for spatial organization of the system ranges from weak intermolecular forces, electrostatic charge, or hydrogen bonding to strong covalent bonding, provided that the electronic coupling strength remains small relative to the energy parameters of the component. While traditional chemistry concentrates on the covalent bond, supramolecular chemistry examines the weaker and reversible non-covalent interactions between molecules. These forces include hydrogen bonding, metal coordination, hydrophobic forces, van der Waals forces, pi–pi interactions and electrostatic effects.

Important concepts advanced by supramolecular chemistry include molecular self-assembly, molecular folding, molecular recognition, host–guest chemistry, mechanically-interlocked molecular architectures, and dynamic covalent chemistry. The study of non-covalent interactions is crucial to understanding many biological processes that rely on these forces for structure and function. Biological systems are often the inspiration for supramolecular research.

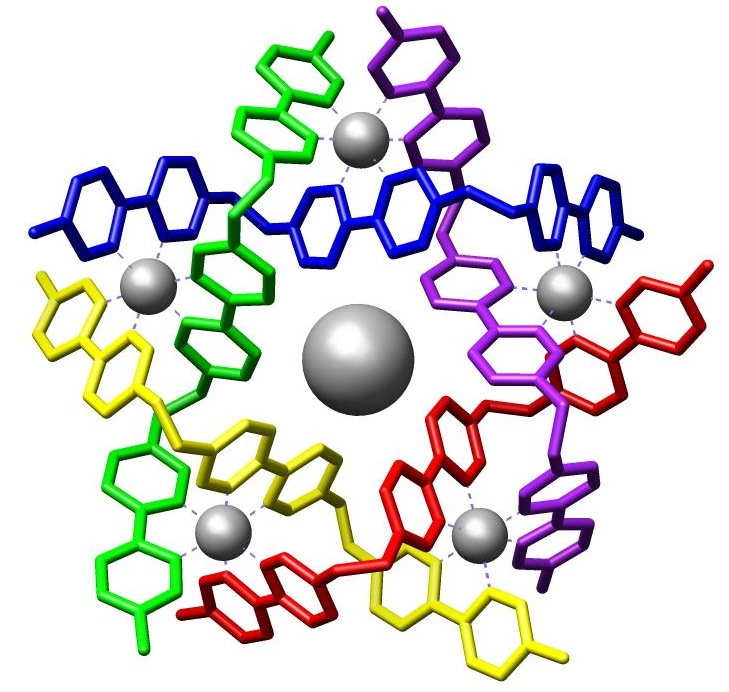
Self-assembly of a circular double helicate

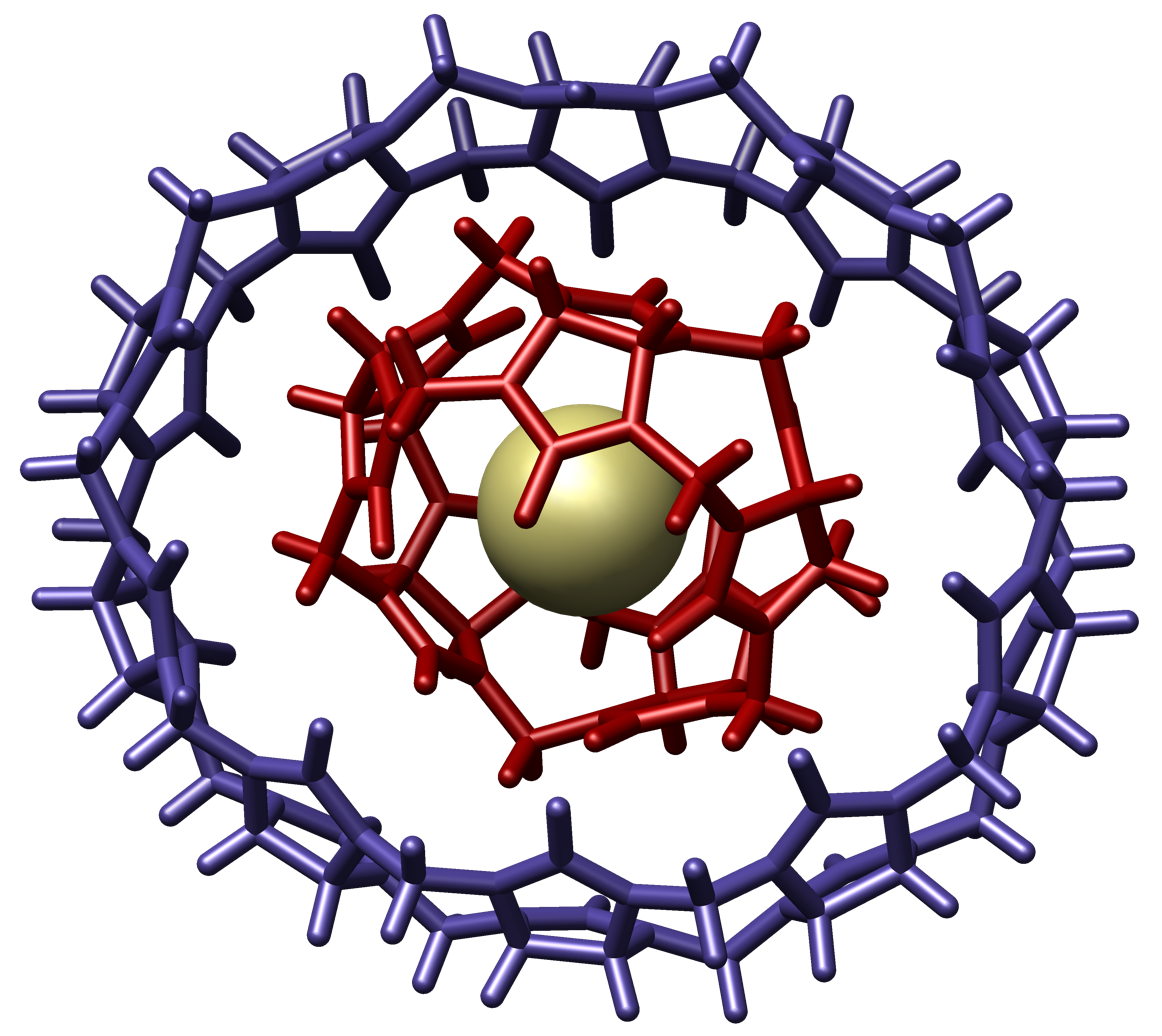
Host–guest complex within another host (cucurbituril)

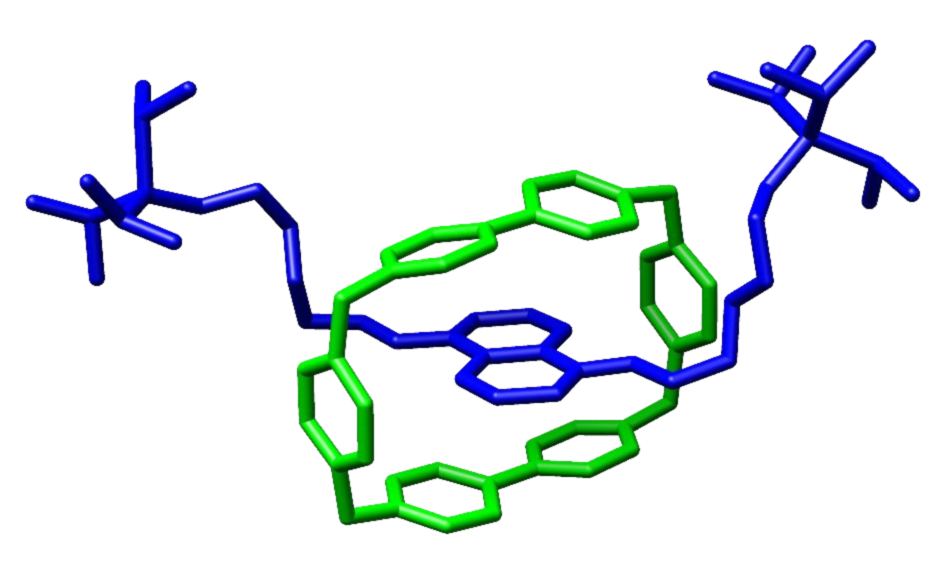
Mechanically-interlocked molecules (rotaxane)

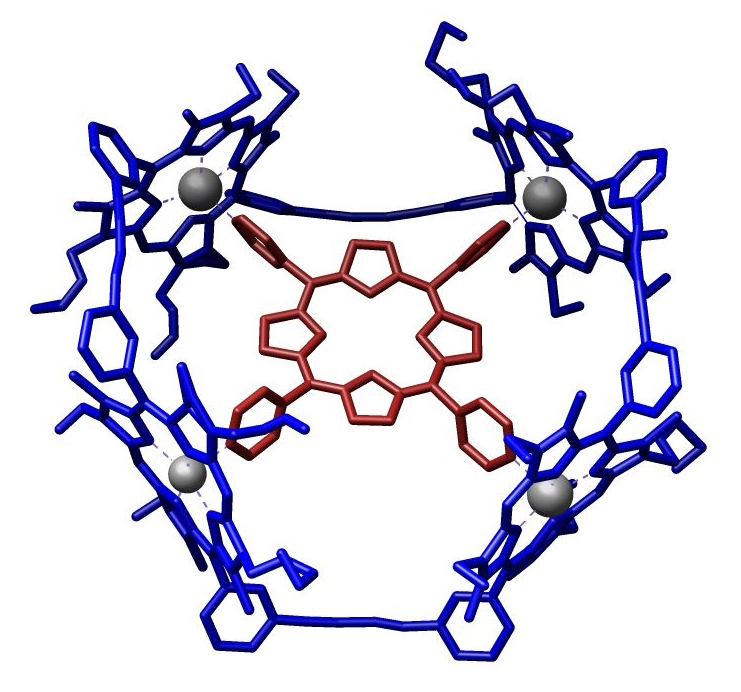
An example of a host–guest chemistry

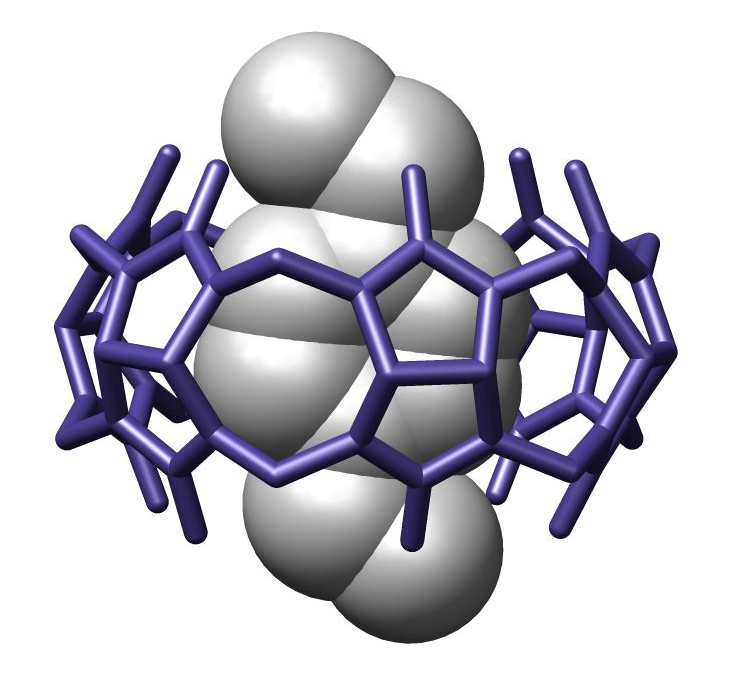
Host–guest complex with a p-xylylenediammonium bound within a cucurbituril

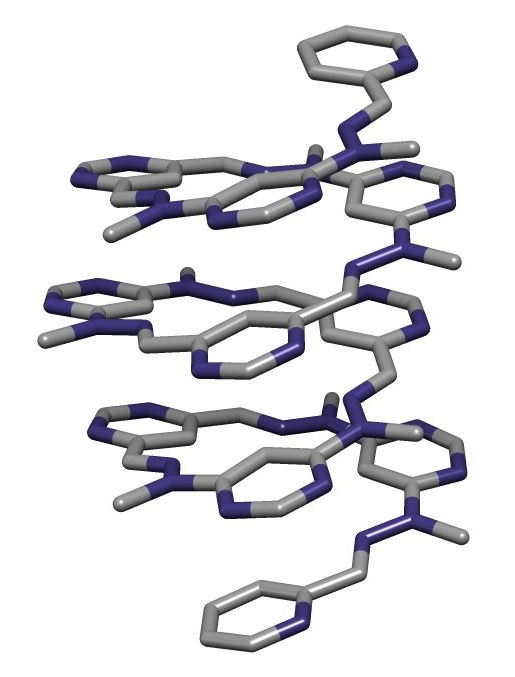
Intramolecular self-assembly of a foldamer

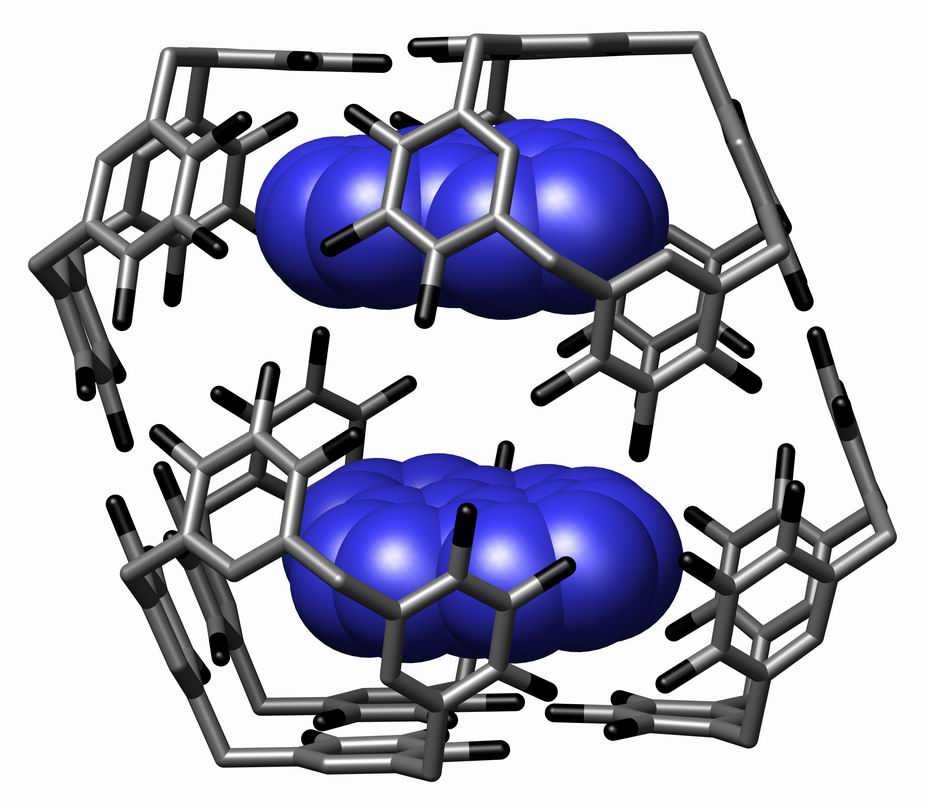
Two pyrene butyric acids bound within a C-hexylpyrogallol[4]arenes nanocapsule. The side chains of the pyrene butyric acids are omitted.

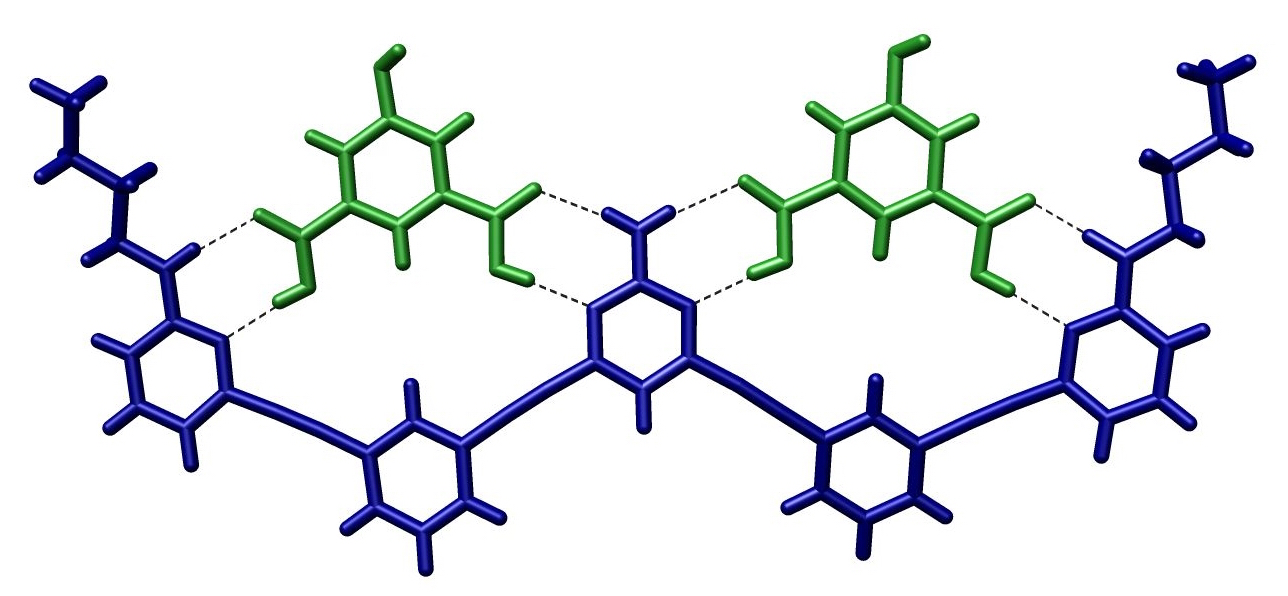
Structure of two isophthalic acids bound to a host molecule through hydrogen bonds

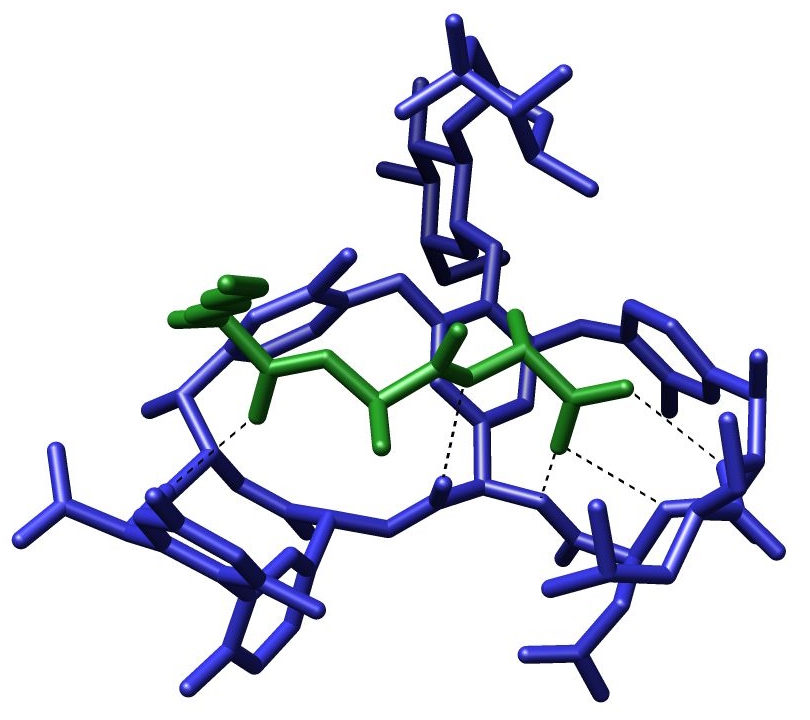
Structure of a short peptide L-Lys-D-Ala-D-Ala (bacterial cell wall precursor) bound to the antibiotic vancomycin

== History ==
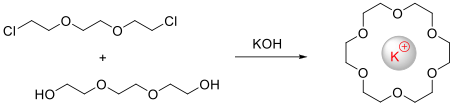
18-crown-6 can be synthesized from using potassium ion as the template cation

The existence of intermolecular forces was first postulated by Johannes Diderik van der Waals in 1873. However, Nobel laureate Hermann Emil Fischer developed supramolecular chemistry's philosophical roots. In 1894, Fischer suggested that enzyme–substrate interactions take the form of a "lock and key", the fundamental principles of molecular recognition and host–guest chemistry. In the early twentieth century non-covalent bonds were understood in gradually more detail, with the hydrogen bond being described by Latimer and Rodebush in 1920.

With the deeper understanding of the non-covalent interactions, for example, the clear elucidation of DNA structure, chemists started to emphasize the importance of non-covalent interactions. In 1967, Charles J. Pedersen discovered crown ethers, which are ring-like structures capable of chelating certain metal ions. Then, in 1969, Jean-Marie Lehn discovered a class of molecules similar to crown ethers, called cryptands. After that, Donald J. Cram synthesized many variations to crown ethers, on top of separate molecules capable of selective interaction with certain chemicals. The three scientists were awarded the Nobel Prize in Chemistry in 1987 for "development and use of molecules with structure-specific interactions of high selectivity". In 2016, Bernard L. Feringa, Sir J. Fraser Stoddart, and Jean-Pierre Sauvage were awarded the Nobel Prize in Chemistry, "for the design and synthesis of molecular machines".

Carboxylic acid dimers

The term supermolecule (or supramolecule) was introduced by Karl Lothar Wolf et al. (Übermoleküle) in 1937 to describe hydrogen-bonded acetic acid dimers. The term supermolecule is also used in biochemistry to describe complexes of biomolecules, such as peptides and oligonucleotides composed of multiple strands.

Eventually, chemists applied these concepts to synthetic systems. One breakthrough came in the 1960s with the synthesis of the crown ethers by Charles J. Pedersen. Following this work, other researchers such as Donald J. Cram, Jean-Marie Lehn and Fritz Vögtle reported a variety of three-dimensional receptors, and throughout the 1980s research in the area gathered a rapid pace with concepts such as mechanically interlocked molecular architectures emerging.

The influence of supramolecular chemistry was established by the 1987 Nobel Prize for Chemistry which was awarded to Donald J. Cram, Jean-Marie Lehn, and Charles J. Pedersen in recognition of their work in this area. The development of selective "host–guest" complexes in particular, in which a host molecule recognizes and selectively binds a certain guest, was cited as an important contribution.

== Concepts ==
A ribosome is a biological machine that uses protein dynamics on nanoscales.

=== Molecular self-assembly ===
Molecular self-assembly is the construction of systems without guidance or management from an outside source (other than to provide a suitable environment). The molecules are directed to assemble through non-covalent interactions. Self-assembly may be subdivided into intermolecular self-assembly (to form a supramolecular assembly), and intramolecular self-assembly (or folding as demonstrated by foldamers and polypeptides). Molecular self-assembly also allows the construction of larger structures such as micelles, membranes, vesicles, liquid crystals, and is important to crystal engineering.

=== Molecular recognition and complexation ===
Molecular recognition is the specific binding of a guest molecule to a complementary host molecule to form a host–guest complex. Often, the definition of which species is the "host" and which is the "guest" is arbitrary. The molecules are able to identify each other using non-covalent interactions. Key applications of this field are the construction of molecular sensors and catalysis.

=== Template-directed synthesis ===
Molecular recognition and self-assembly may be used with reactive species in order to pre-organize a system for a chemical reaction (to form one or more covalent bonds). It may be considered a special case of supramolecular catalysis. Non-covalent bonds between the reactants and a "template" hold the reactive sites of the reactants close together, facilitating the desired chemistry. This technique is particularly useful for situations where the desired reaction conformation is thermodynamically or kinetically unlikely, such as in the preparation of large macrocycles. This pre-organization also serves purposes such as minimizing side reactions, lowering the activation energy of the reaction, and producing desired stereochemistry. After the reaction has taken place, the template may remain in place, be forcibly removed, or may be "automatically" decomplexed on account of the different recognition properties of the reaction product. The template may be as simple as a single metal ion or may be extremely complex.

=== Mechanically interlocked molecular architectures ===
Mechanically interlocked molecular architectures consist of molecules that are linked only as a consequence of their topology. Some non-covalent interactions may exist between the different components (often those that were used in the construction of the system), but covalent bonds do not. Supramolecular chemistry, and template-directed synthesis in particular, is key to the efficient synthesis of the compounds. Examples of mechanically interlocked molecular architectures include catenanes, rotaxanes, molecular knots, molecular Borromean rings, 2D [c2]daisy chain polymer and ravels.

=== Dynamic covalent chemistry ===
In dynamic covalent chemistry covalent bonds are broken and formed in a reversible reaction under thermodynamic control. While covalent bonds are key to the process, the system is directed by non-covalent forces to form the lowest energy structures.

=== Biomimetics ===
Many synthetic supramolecular systems are designed to copy functions of biological systems. These biomimetic architectures can be used to learn about both the biological model and the synthetic implementation. Examples include photoelectrochemical systems, catalytic systems, protein design and self-replication.

=== Imprinting ===
Molecular imprinting describes a process by which a host is constructed from small molecules using a suitable molecular species as a template. After construction, the template is removed leaving only the host. The template for host construction may be subtly different from the guest that the finished host binds to. In its simplest form, imprinting uses only steric interactions, but more complex systems also incorporate hydrogen bonding and other interactions to improve binding strength and specificity.

=== Molecular machinery ===
Molecular machines are molecules or molecular assemblies that can perform functions such as linear or rotational movement, switching, and entrapment. These devices exist at the boundary between supramolecular chemistry and nanotechnology, and prototypes have been demonstrated using supramolecular concepts. Jean-Pierre Sauvage, Sir J. Fraser Stoddart and Bernard L. Feringa shared the 2016 Nobel Prize in Chemistry for the 'design and synthesis of molecular machines'.

== Building blocks ==
Supramolecular systems are rarely designed from first principles. Rather, chemists have a range of well-studied structural and functional building blocks that they are able to use to build up larger functional architectures. Many of these exist as whole families of similar units, from which the analog with the exact desired properties can be chosen.

=== Synthetic recognition motifs ===
- The pi-pi charge-transfer interactions of bipyridinium with dioxyarenes or diaminoarenes have been used extensively for the construction of mechanically interlocked systems and in crystal engineering.
- The use of crown ether binding with metal or ammonium cations is ubiquitous in supramolecular chemistry.
- The formation of carboxylic acid dimers and other simple hydrogen bonding interactions.
- The complexation of bipyridines or terpyridines with ruthenium, silver or other metal ions is of great utility in the construction of complex architectures of many individual molecules.
- Anion complexation provides a means of linking modules.

=== Macrocycles ===
Macrocycles are a traditional component in supramolecular chemistry. The macrocyclic effect enhances otherwise weak interactions. Cyclodextrins, calixarenes, cucurbiturils, and crown ethers allow the incorporation of alkali metal cations. More complex, 3-dimenesion receptors include cyclophanes, and cryptands. Supramolecular metallocycles and metallacrowns are related components. Common metallocycle shapes in these types of applications include triangles, squares, and pentagons, each bearing functional groups that connect the pieces via "self-assembly."

=== Structural units ===
Many supramolecular systems require their components to have suitable spacing and conformations relative to each other, and therefore easily employed structural units are required.

- Commonly used spacers and connecting groups include polyether chains, biphenyls and terphenyls, and simple alkyl chains. The chemistry for creating and connecting these units is very well understood.
- nanoparticles, nanorods, fullerenes and dendrimers offer nanometer-sized structure and encapsulation units.
- Surfaces can be used as scaffolds for the construction of complex systems and also for interfacing electrochemical systems with electrodes. Regular surfaces can be used for the construction of self-assembled monolayers and multilayers.
- The understanding of intermolecular interactions in solids has undergone a major renaissance via inputs from different experimental and computational methods in the last decade. This includes high-pressure studies in solids and "in situ" crystallization of compounds which are liquids at room temperature along with the use of electron density analysis, crystal structure prediction and DFT calculations in solid state to enable a quantitative understanding of the nature, energetics and topological properties associated with such interactions in crystals.

=== Photo-chemically and electro-chemically active units ===
- Porphyrins, and phthalocyanines have highly tunable photochemical and electrochemical activity as well as the potential to form complexes.
- Photochromic and photoisomerizable groups can change their shapes and properties, including binding properties, upon exposure to light.
- Tetrathiafulvalene (TTF) and quinones have multiple stable oxidation states, and therefore can be used in redox reactions and electrochemistry.
- Other units, such as benzidine derivatives, viologens, and fullerenes, are useful in supramolecular electrochemical devices.

=== Biologically-derived units ===
- The extremely strong complexation between avidin and biotin is instrumental in blood clotting, and has been used as the recognition motif to construct synthetic systems.
- The binding of enzymes with their cofactors has been used as a route to produce modified enzymes, electrically contacted enzymes, and even photoswitchable enzymes.
- DNA has been used both as a structural and as a functional unit in synthetic supramolecular systems.

== Applications ==
Supramolecular chemistry per se has found few applications, but underpins some useful phenomena.

=== Catalysis ===
The concepts of supramolecular chemistry can inspire the design of catalysts. Non-covalent interactions influence the binding reactants.

=== Medicine ===
Design based on supramolecular chemistry has inspired the design of functional biomaterials and therapeutics. Supramolecular biomaterials afford a number of modular and generalizable platforms with tunable mechanical, chemical and biological properties. These include systems based on supramolecular assembly of peptides, host–guest macrocycles, high-affinity hydrogen bonding, and metal–ligand interactions.

A supramolecular approach has been used extensively to create artificial ion channels for the transport of sodium and potassium ions into and out of cells.

Supramolecular interactions influence drug-target binding. In the area of drug delivery, supramolecular chemistry could provide encapsulation and targeted release mechanisms. In addition, supramolecular systems have been designed to disrupt protein–protein interactions that are important to cellular function.

=== Sensors ===
Supramolecular interactions have been proposed to detect analytes.

== See also ==
- Organic chemistry
- Nanotechnology

== Reading ==
- Cook, T. R.; Zheng, Y.; Stang, P. J. (2013). "Metal-organic frameworks and self-assembled supramolecular coordination complexes: Comparing and contrasting the design, synthesis, and functionality of metal-organic materials". Chem. Rev. 113 (1): 734–77. doi:10.1021/cr3002824. PMC 3764682. PMID 23121121.
- Desiraju, G. R. (2013). "Crystal engineering: From molecule to crystal". J. Am. Chem. Soc. 135 (27): 9952–67. Bibcode:2013JAChS.135.9952D. doi:10.1021/ja403264c. PMID 23750552.
- Seto, C. T.; Whitesides, G. M. (1993). "Molecular self-assembly through hydrogen bonding: Supramolecular aggregates based on the cyanuric acid-melamine lattice". J. Am. Chem. Soc. 115 (3): 905–916. Bibcode:1993JAChS.115..905S. doi:10.1021/ja00056a014.
