= Calixarene =

Basket-shaped ring molecule able to store other molecules within itself

IUPAC definition

calixarenes: Originally macrocyclic compounds capable of assuming a basket (or 'calix') shaped conformation. They are formed from p-hydrocarbyl phenols and formaldehyde. The term now applies to a variety of derivatives by substitution of the hydrocarbon cyclo{oligo(1,3-phenylene)methylene}.

A calixarene is a macrocycle or cyclic oligomer based on methylene-linked phenols. With hydrophobic cavities that can hold smaller molecules or ions, calixarenes belong to the class of cavitands known in host–guest chemistry.

== Nomenclature ==
Calixarene nomenclature is straightforward and involves counting the number of repeating units in the ring and including it in the name. A calix[4]arene has 4 units in the ring and a calix[6]arene has 6. A substituent in the meso position R_{b} is added to the name with a prefix C- as in C-methylcalix[6]arene The word calixarene is derived from the Greek calix or chalice because this type of molecule resembles a vase (or cup) and from the word arene that refers to the aromatic building block.

== Synthesis ==
Calixarenes are generally produced by condensation of two components: an electron-rich aromatic compound, classically a 4-substituted phenol, and an aldehyde, classically formaldehyde.

- The scope for the aromatic component is broad diverse. The key attribute is susceptibility toward hydroxyalkylation. The related resorcinarenes and pyrogallolarenes are produced from resorcinol and pyrogallol, respectively.
- The aldehyde most often used is formaldehyde, while larger aldehydes, like acetaldehyde, are usually required in condensation reactions with resorcinol and pyrogallol to facilitate formation of the C_{4v} symmetric vase conformation. Additionally, substituted aldehydes and some heterocycles (e.g. furan) may be used to impart additional functional groups onto the pendent groups of resorcinarenes and pyrogallolarenes.

Calixarenes can be challenging to synthesize, producing instead complex mixtures of linear and cyclic oligomers. With finely tuned starting materials and reaction conditions, synthesis can also be surprisingly efficient. Calixarenes are sparingly soluble as parent compounds and have high melting points.

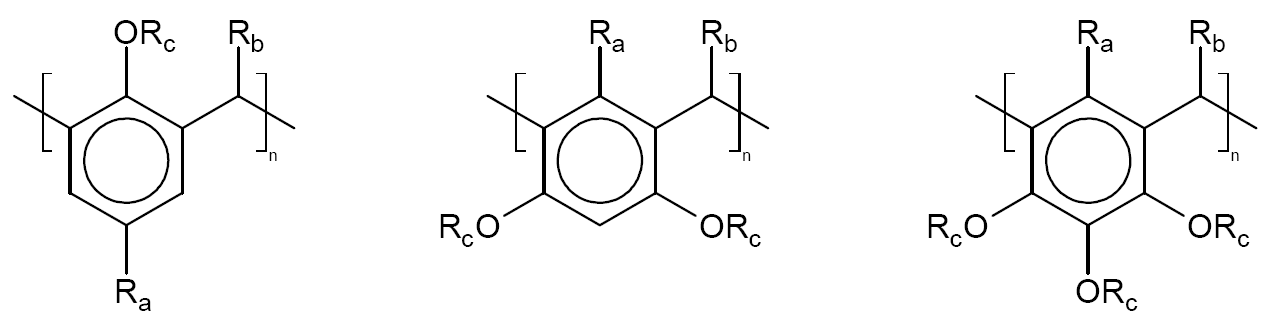
from left to right with n = 4 calix[4]arene, resorcinol[4]arene, pyrogallol[4]arene. Ra is an alkyl substituent, Rb is hydrogen with formaldehyde or phenyl with benzaldehyde, Rc is hydrogen in the parent compounds

== Structure ==
Calixarenes are characterised by a three-dimensional basket, cup or bucket shape. In calix[4]arenes the internal volume is around 10 cubic angstroms. Calixarenes are characterised by a wide upper rim and a narrow lower rim and a central annulus. With phenol as a starting material the 4 hydroxyl groups are intrannular on the lower rim. In a resorcin[4]arene 8 hydroxyl groups are placed extraannular on the upper ring. Calixarenes exist in different chemical conformations because rotation around the methylene bridge is not difficult. In calix[4]arene 4 up–down conformations exist: cone (point group C_{2v},C_{4v}), partial cone C_{s}, 1,2 alternate C_{2h} and 1,3 alternate D_{2d}. The 4 hydroxyl groups interact by hydrogen bonding and stabilize the cone conformation. This conformation is in dynamic equilibrium with the other conformations. Conformations can be locked in place with proper substituents replacing the hydroxyl groups which increase the rotational barrier. Alternatively placing a bulky substituent on the upper rim also locks a conformation. The calixarene based on p-tert-butyl phenol is also a cone. Calixarenes are structurally related to the pillararenes.

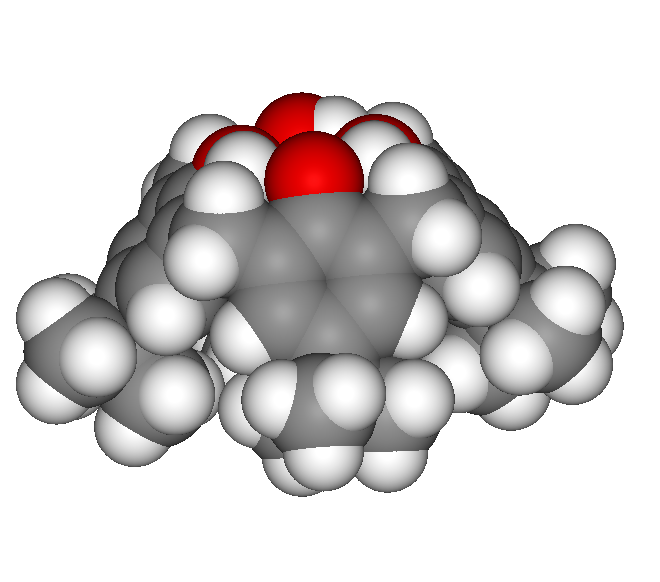
Calix[4]arene with para-tert-butyl substituents	3D representation of a cone conformation

== History ==
In 1872 Adolf von Baeyer mixed various aldehydes, including formaldehyde, with phenols in a strongly acidic solution. The resultant tars defied characterization; but represented the typical products of a phenol/formaldehyde polymerization. Leo Baekeland discovered that these tars could be cured into a brittle substance which he marketed as "Bakelite". This polymer was the first commercial synthetic plastic.

The success of Bakelite spurred scientific investigations into the chemistry of the phenol/formaldehyde reaction. One result was the discovery made in 1942 by Alois Zinke, that p-alkyl phenols and formaldehyde in a strongly basic solution yield mixtures containing cyclic tetramers. Concomitantly, Joseph Niederl and H. J. Vogel obtained similar cyclic tetramers from the acid-catalyzed reaction of resorcinol and aldehydes such as benzaldehyde. A number of years later, John Cornforth showed that the product from p-tert-butylphenol and formaldehyde is a mixture of the cyclic tetramer and another ambiguous cyclomer. His interest in these compounds was in the tuberculostatic properties of their oxyethylated derivatives.

In the early 1970s C. David Gutsche recognized the calix shape of the cyclic tetramer and thought that it might furnish the structure for building an enzyme xenologue. He initiated a study that lasted for three decades. His attention to these compounds came from acquaintance with the Petrolite company's commercial demulsifiers, made by ethoxylation of the still ambiguous products from p-alkylphenols and formaldehyde. He introduced the name "calixarene": from "calix", the Greek name for a chalice, and "arene" for the presence of aryl groups in the cyclic array. He also determined the structures for the cyclic tetramer, hexamer, and octamer, along with procedures for obtaining these materials in good to excellent yields. He then established procedures for attaching functional groups to both the upper and lower rims and mapped the conformational states of these flexible molecules. Additionally, he proved that the cyclic tetramer can be frozen into a cone conformation, by the addition of measurably large substituents to the lower "rim" of the calix shape.

Concomitant with Gutsche's work was that of the Hermann Kämmerer and Volker Böhmer. They developed methods for the stepwise synthesis of calixarenes. Chemists of University of Parma, Giovanni Andreetti, Rocco Ungaro and Andrea Pochini were the first to resolve X-ray crystallographic images of calixarenes. In the mid 1980s, other investigators joined the field of calixarene chemistry. It has become an important aspect of supramolecular chemistry and attracts the attention of hundreds of scientists around the world. The Niederl cyclic tetramers from resorcinol and aldehydes were studied in detail by Donald J. Cram, who called the derived compounds "cavitands" and "carcerands". An accurate and detailed history of the calixarenes along with extensive discussion of calixarene chemistry can be found in Gutsche's monograph.

== Medical uses ==
Water soluble calixarenes, such as para-sulfonatocalix[4]arene, have not only been examined for drug delivery, but also for their potential as pharmaceutical drugs themselves, directly combating disease. Calix[6]arene, for instance, has been shown to inhibit extracellular vesicle biogenesis of extracellular vesicles in pancreatic cancer. In turn, this impairs release of matrix metalloprotease enzymes in the tumor microenvironment, in turn slowing down metastasis of disease. Thus in conjunction with their low toxicity they are considered promising agents for combating oncological disease.

== Host guest interactions ==
Calixarenes are used in commercial applications as sodium selective electrodes for the measurement of sodium levels in blood. Calixarenes also form complexes with cadmium, lead, lanthanides and actinides. Calix[5]arene and the C_{70} fullerene in p-xylene form a ball-and-socket supramolecular complex. Calixarenes also form exo-calix ammonium salts with aliphatic amines such as piperidine. Derivatives or homologues of calix[4]arene exhibit highly selective binding behavior towards anions (especially halogen anions) with changes in optical properties such as fluorescence.

Calixarenes in general, and more specifically calix[4]arenes have been extensively investigated as platforms for catalysts. Some complexes compounds are active for hydrolytic reactions.

Calixarenes are of interest as enzyme mimetics, components of ion sensitive electrodes or sensors, selective membranes, non-linear optics and in HPLC stationary phases. In addition, in nanotechnology calixarenes are used as negative resist for high-resolution electron beam lithography.

A tetrathia[4]arene is found to mimic some properties of the aquaporin proteins. This calixarene adopts a 1,3-alternate conformation (methoxy groups populate the lower ring) and water is not contained in the basket but grabbed by two opposing tert-butyl groups on the outer rim in a pincer. The nonporous and hydrophobic crystals are soaked in water for 8 hours in which time the calixarene:water ratio nevertheless acquires the value of one.

Calixarenes accelerate reactions taking place inside the concavity by a combination of local concentration effect and polar stabilization of the transition state. An extended resorcin[4]arene cavitand is found to accelerate the reaction rate of a Menshutkin reaction between quinuclidine and butylbromide by a factor of 1600.

In heterocalixarenes the phenolic units are replaced by heterocycles, for instance by furans in calix[n]furanes and by pyridines in calix[n]pyridines. Calixarenes have been used as the macrocycle portion of a rotaxane and two calixarene molecules covalently joined together by the lower rims form carcerands.
