= Host–guest chemistry =

Supramolecular structures held together other than by covalent bonds

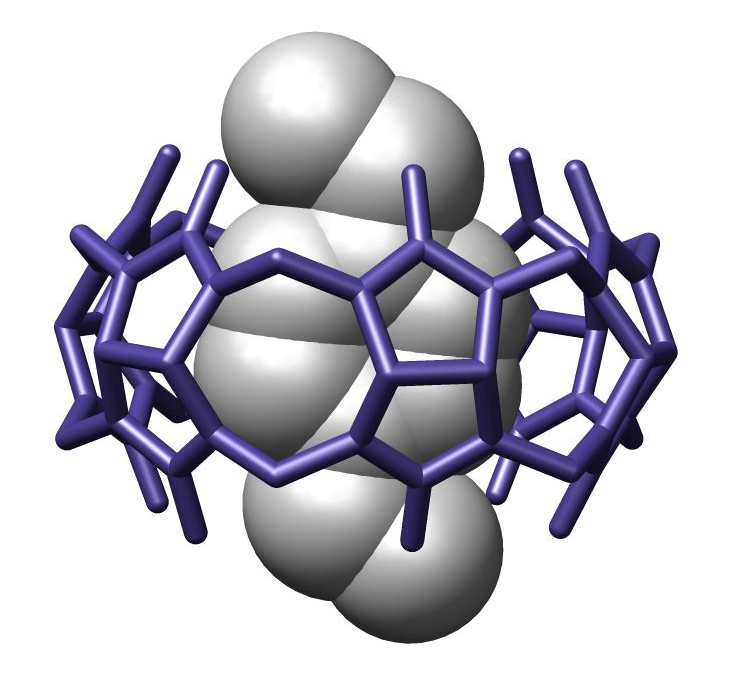
Crystal structure of a host–guest complex with a p-xylylenediammonium bound within a cucurbituril

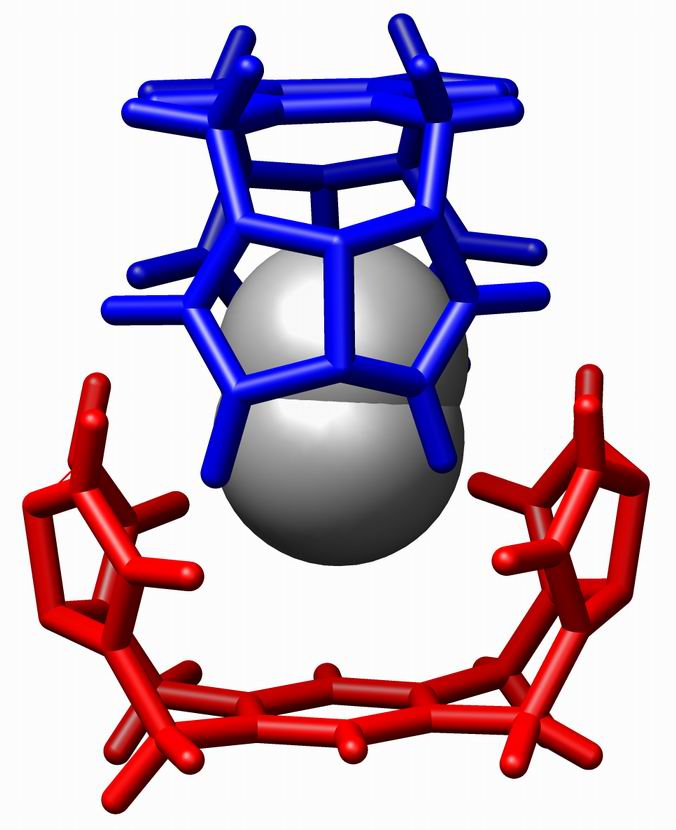
A guest N_{2} is bound within a host hydrogen-bonded capsule

In supramolecular chemistry, host–guest chemistry describes complexes composed of two or more molecules or ions held together in unique structural relationships by forces other than those of full covalent bonds. Host–guest chemistry therefore encompasses the idea of molecular recognition and interactions through non-covalent bonding, which is critical in maintaining the three-dimensional structure of large molecules, such as proteins, and is involved in many biological processes in which large molecules bind specifically but transiently to one another.

Although non-covalent interactions could be roughly divided into those with more electrostatic or dispersive contributions, there are a few commonly mentioned types of non-covalent interactions: ionic bonding, hydrogen bonding, van der Waals forces, and hydrophobic interactions.

Host–guest interaction has raised significant attention since it was discovered. Many biological processes and material designs require the host–guest interaction. There are several typical host molecules, such as cyclodextrin and crown ether.

Host molecules usually have a pore-like structure that is able to capture a guest molecule. Although called molecules, hosts and guests are often ions. The driving forces of the interaction vary, such as hydrophobic effect and van der Waals forces.

Binding between host and guest can be highly selective, in which case the interaction is called molecular recognition. Often, a dynamic equilibrium exists between the unbound and the bound states:

H + G ⇌ HG

where H denotes "host", G denotes "guest", and HG denotes "host–guest complex".

The host component is often the larger molecule, and it encloses the smaller guest molecule. In biological systems, the terms host and guest are commonly referred to as enzyme and substrate, respectively.

== Inclusion and clathrate compounds ==
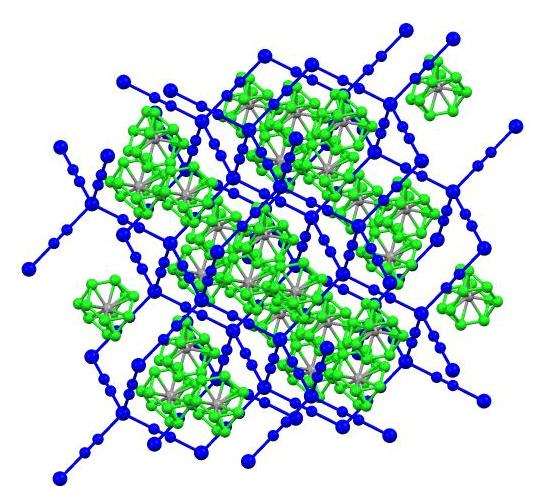
Cd(CN)_{2}·CCl_{4}: Cadmium cyanide clathrate framework (in blue) containing carbon tetrachloride (C atoms in gray and disordered Cl positions in green)

Closely related to host–guest chemistry are inclusion compounds (also known as inclusion complexes). These are chemical complexes in which one chemical compound (the "host") has a cavity into which a "guest" compound can be accommodated. The interaction between the host and guest involves van der Waals bonding. The definition of inclusion compounds is very broad, extending to channels formed between molecules in a crystal lattice in which guest molecules can fit.

IUPAC definition

The IUPAC Gold Book defines an inclusion compound as a complex in which a host forms a cavity or lattice of channels that accommodates a guest species; the association is non-covalent and generally driven by van der Waals forces.

Another related class of compounds are clathrates, which often consist of a lattice that traps or contains molecules. The word clathrate is derived from the Latin clathratus (clatratus), meaning 'with bars, latticed'.

== Molecular encapsulation ==
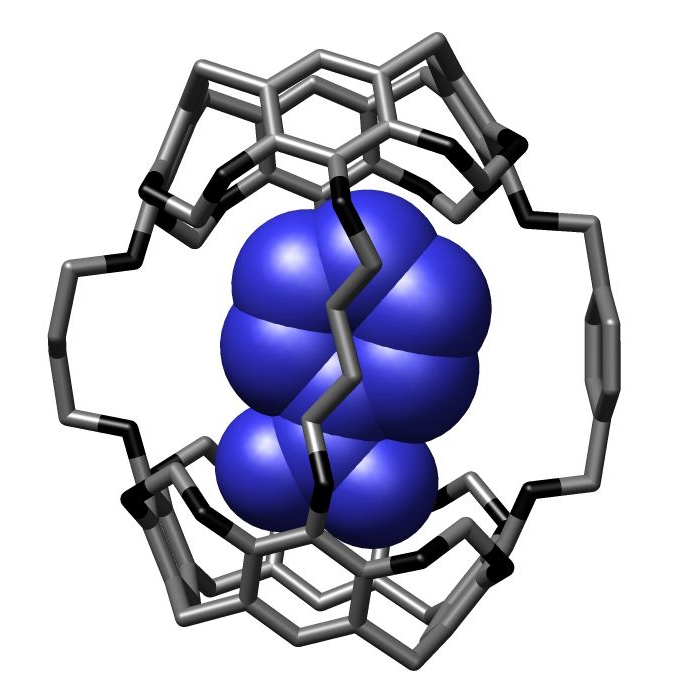
Molecular encapsulation of a nitrobenzene bound within a hemicarcerand

Molecular encapsulation concerns the confinement of a guest within a larger host. In some cases, true host–guest reversibility is observed. In other cases, the encapsulated guest cannot escape.

An important implication of encapsulation (and host–guest chemistry in general) is that the guest behaves differently than when in solution. Guest molecules that would react by bimolecular pathways are often stabilized because they cannot combine with other reactants. Compounds that are normally highly unstable in solution, like cyclobutadiene, arynes, or cycloheptatetraene, have been isolated at room temperature when molecularly encapsulated. Large metalla-assemblies, known as metallaprisms, contain a conformationally flexible cavity that allows them to host a variety of guest molecules. These assemblies have shown promise as agents of drug delivery to cancer cells.

Encapsulation can control reactivity. For instance, excited state reactivity of free 1-phenyl-3-tolyl-2-proponanone (abbreviated A−CO−B) yields products A−A, B−B, and AB, which result from decarbonylation followed by random recombination of radicals A^{•} and B^{•}. Whereas, the same substrate upon encapsulation reacts to yield the controlled recombination product A−B, and rearranged products (isomers of A−CO−B).

== Macrocyclic hosts ==
Organic hosts are occasionally called cavitands. The original definition proposed by Cram includes many classes of molecules: cyclodextrins, calixarenes, pillararenes, and cucurbiturils.

=== Calixarenes ===
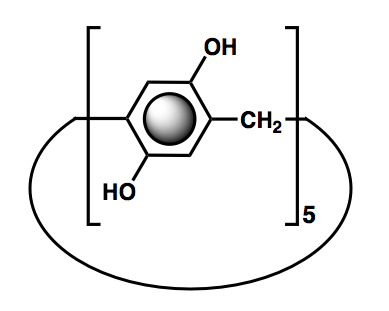
Chemical structure of pillar[5]arene

Calixarenes and related formaldehyde-arene condensates (resorcinarenes and pyrogallolarenes) form a class of hosts that form inclusion compounds. Pillararenes (pillared arenes) are a related family of formaldehyde-derived oligomeric rings. One famous illustration of the stabilizing effect of host–guest complexation is the stabilization of cyclobutadiene by such an organic host.

=== Cyclodextrins and cucurbiturils ===
Cyclodextrins (CDs) are tubular molecules composed of several glucose units connected by ether bonds. The three kinds of CDs — α-CD (six units), β-CD (seven units), and γ-CD (eight units)—differ in their cavity sizes: 5, 6, and 8 Å, respectively. α-CD can thread onto one PEG chain, while γ-CD can thread onto two PEG chains. β-CD can bind with thiophene-based molecules. Cyclodextrins are well established hosts for the formation of inclusion compounds. An example is when ferrocene is inserted into the cyclodextrin at 100 °C (212 °F) under hydrothermal conditions.

Cucurbiturils are macrocyclic molecules made of glycoluril (=C_{4}H_{2}N_{4}O_{2}=) monomers, linked by methylene bridges (−CH_{2}−). The oxygen atoms are located along the edges of the band and are tilted inwards, forming a partly enclosed cavity (cavitand). Cucurbit[n]urils have similar size of γ-CD, and which behave similarly (e.g., one cucurbit[n]uril can thread onto two PEG chains).

=== Cryptophanes ===
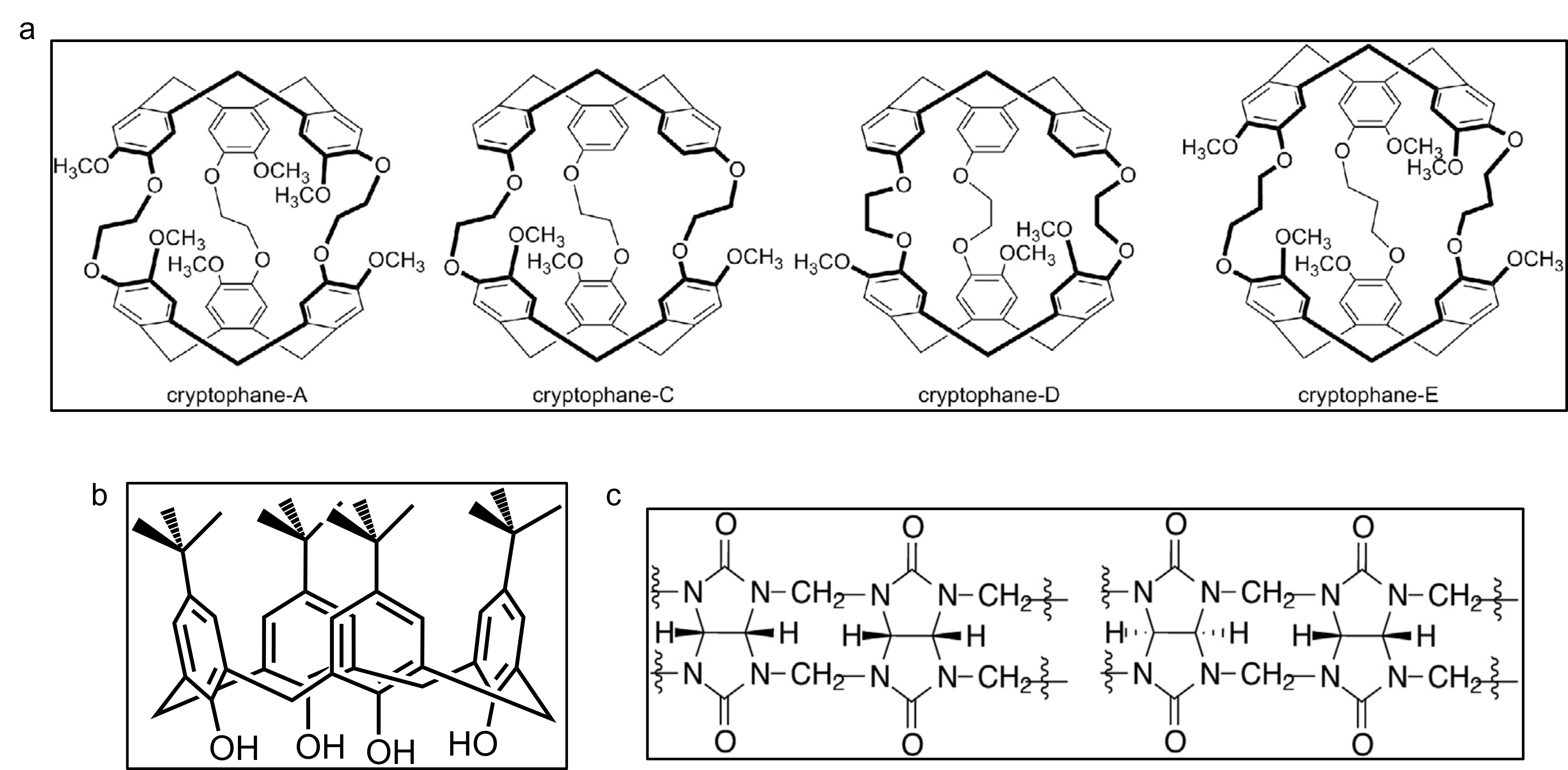
1. Structure of cryptophanes.; 2. Structure of resorcinarenes and pyrogallolarenes.; 3. Structure of cucurbit[n]urils.; Redrawn from source material.

The structure of cryptophanes contain six phenyl rings, mainly connected in four ways. Due to the phenyl groups and aliphatic chains, the cages inside cryptophanes are highly hydrophobic, suggesting the capability of capturing non-polar molecules. Based on this, cryptophanes can be employed to capture xenon in aqueous solution to help biological studies.

=== Crown ethers and cryptands ===
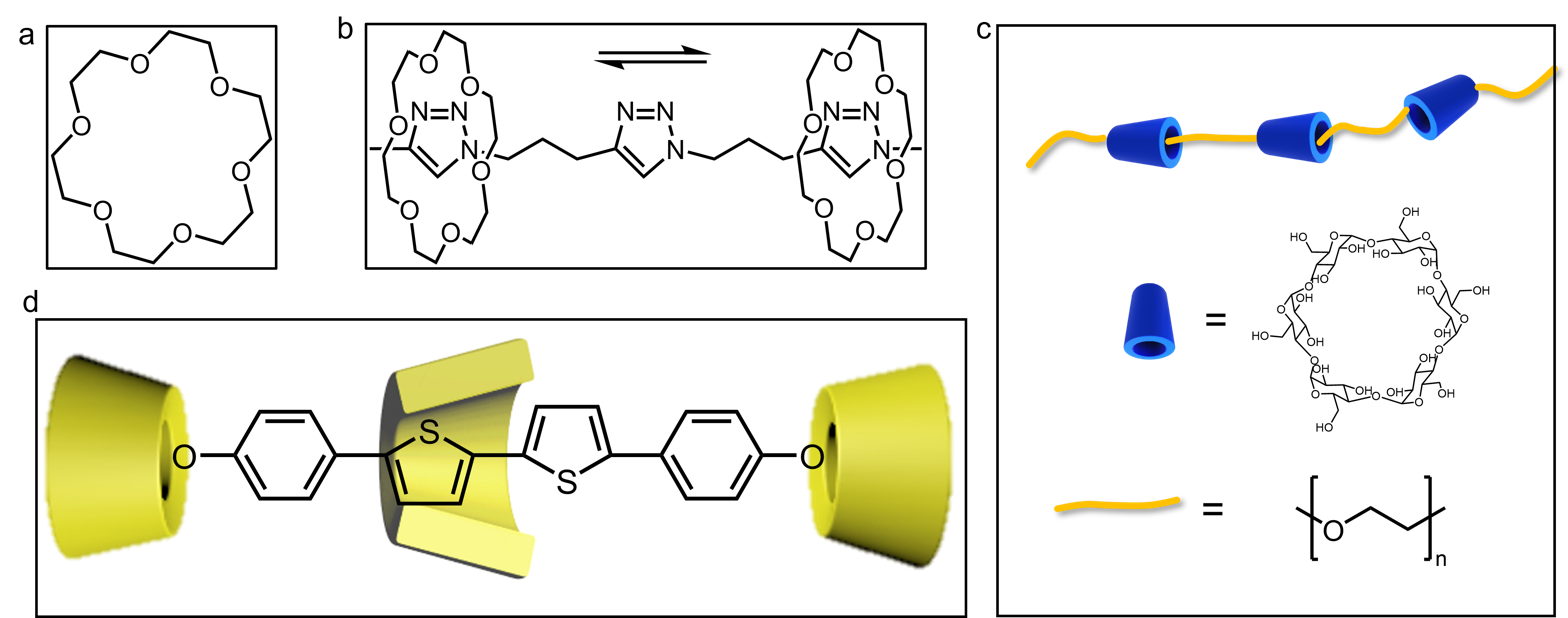
1. Structure of 18-crown-6.; 2. Threading of crown ether and 1,2,3-triazole (rotaxane).; 3. Inclusion of α-CD and polyethylene glycol (PEG).; 4. Threading of β-cyclodextrin and thiophene-based molecule.; Redrawn from source material.

Crown ethers bind cations. Small crown ethers (e.g. 12-crown-4) bind well to small ions such as Li^{+}. Large crowns (e.g. 24-crown-8) bind better to larger ions. Crown ethers also bind to some neutral molecules (e.g. 1,2,3-triazole). Crown ethers can also be threaded with slender linear molecules or polymers, creating supramolecular structures called rotaxanes. Given that the crown ethers are not bound to the chains, they can move up and down the threading molecule. Crown ether complexes of metal cations (and the corresponding complexes of cryptands) are not considered to be inclusion complexes, since the guest is bound by forces stronger than van der Waals bonding.

=== Chiral capsules ===
Molecular capsules have been developed with a chiral interiors. This capsule is made of two halves, like a plastic easter egg (Figure 6). Salt bridge interactions between the two halves cause them to self-assemble in solution (Figure 7). They are stable even when heated to 60 °C (140 °F).

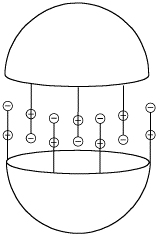
Fig. 6. The "egg shell" molecular capsule

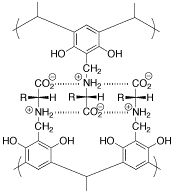
Fig. 7. Interlacing salt bridges that connect the two halves of the molecular capsule

A self-assembled M_{4}L_{6} supramolecular host with a tetrahedral hydrophobic cavity can encapsulate white phosphorus. Pyrophoric phosphorus, which self-combusts upon contact with air, is rendered air-stable within the cavity.

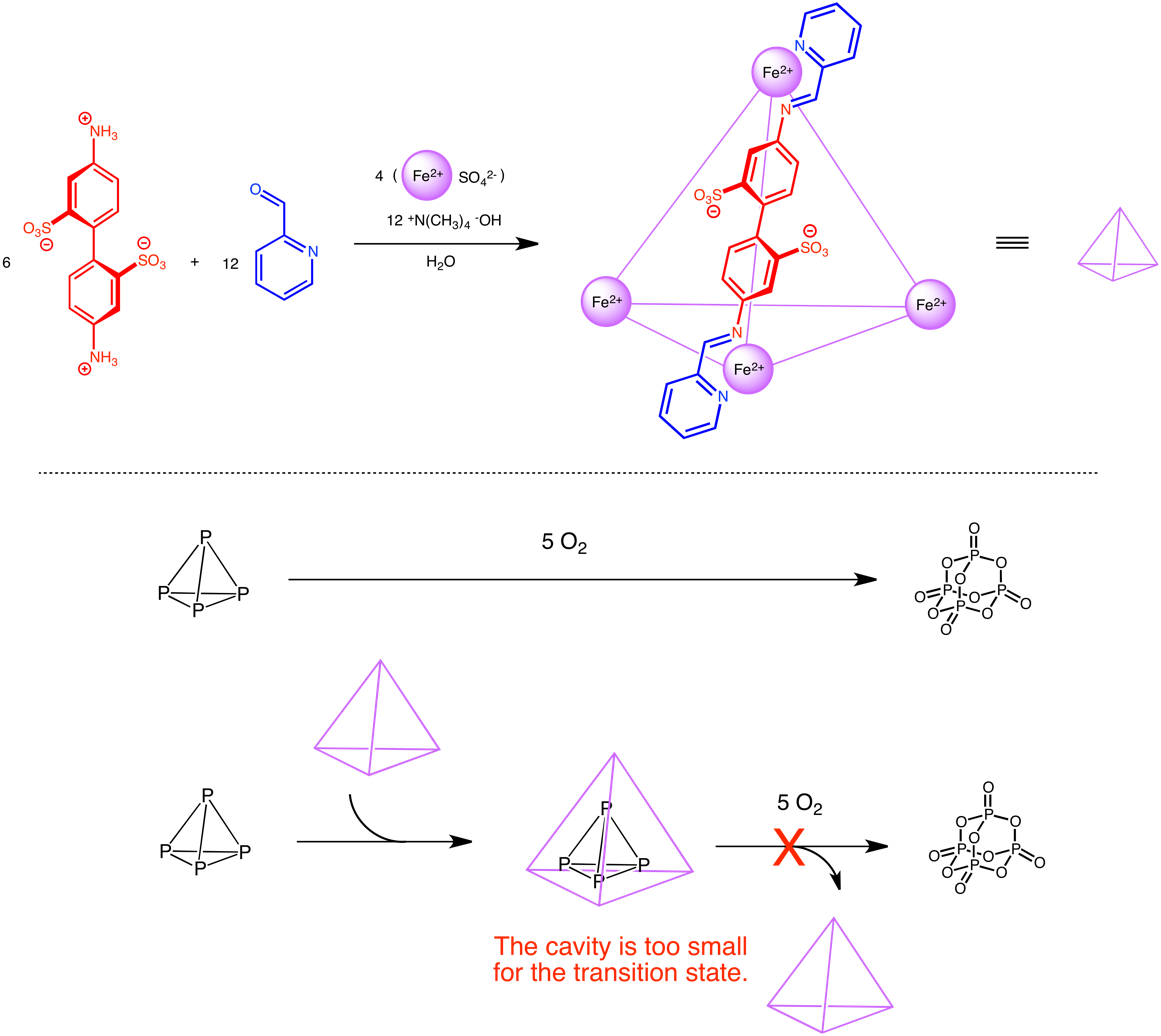
A subcomponent self-assembled tetrahedral capsule developed by Jonathan Nitschke renders pyrophoric white phosphorus air-stable. The structure drawn here shows only one ligand for the sake of simplicity, but there are six ligands on the edges of the tetrahedral complex.

== Polymeric hosts ==
Zeolites have open framework structures with cavities where guest species can reside. Zeolites are rigid due to their aluminosilicate composition. Many structures are known, some of which are used as catalysts and for separations.

Silica clathrasil are compounds that are structurally similar to clathrate hydrates with a SiO_{2} framework and can be found in a range of marine sediments.

Clathrate compounds—of the formula A_{8}B_{16}X_{30}, where A is an alkaline earth metal, B is a group III element, and X is a group IV element—have been explored for thermoelectric devices. Thermoelectric materials follow a design strategy called the phonon glass electron crystal concept. Low thermal conductivity and high electrical conductivity is desired to produce the Seebeck Effect. When the guest and host framework are appropriately tuned, clathrates can exhibit low thermal conductivity (i.e., phonon glass behavior) while electrical conductivity through the host framework is undisturbed, allowing clathrates to exhibit electron crystal.

Hofmann clathrates are coordination polymers, with the formula Ni(CN)_{4}·Ni(NH_{3})_{2}(arene). These materials crystallize with small aromatic guests (benzene, certain xylenes), and this selectivity has been commercially exploited for the separation of these hydrocarbons. Metal organic frameworks (MOFs) form clathrates.

Urea, a small molecule with the formula O=C(NH_{2})_{2}, has the property of crystallizing in open but rigid networks. The cost of efficient molecular packing is compensated by hydrogen-bonding. Ribbons of hydrogen-bonded urea molecules form a tunnel-like host into which many organic guests bind. Urea-clathrates have been well investigated for separations. Several other organic molecules form clathrates: thiourea, hydroquinone, and Dianin's compound.

== Thermodynamics of host–guest interactions ==
When the host and guest molecules combine to form a single complex, the equilibrium is represented as H + G ⇌ HG and the equilibrium constant, K, is defined as K = [HG]/[H][G] where [X] denotes the concentration of a chemical species X (all activity coefficients are assumed to have a numerical values of 1). The mass-balance equations, at any data point, T_{H} = K[H][G] and T_{G} = [G] + K[H][G] where T_{G} and T_{H} represent the total concentrations, of host and guest, can be reduced to a single quadratic equation in, say, [G] and so can be solved analytically for any given value of K. The concentrations [H] and [HG] can then derived; [H] = T_{H} - T_{G} + [G], and [HG] = K[H][G].

The next step is to calculate the value X^{calc}_{i} of a quantity corresponding to the quantity observed X^{obs}_{i}. Then, a sum of squares, U, over all data points, np, can be defined as
$$U=\sum_{i=1,np} (X^{obs}_i -X^{calc}_i)^2$$
and this can be minimized with respect to the stability constant value, K, and a parameter such as the chemical shift of the species HG (NMR data) or its molar absorbency (UV–Vis data). This procedure is applicable to 1:1 adducts.

=== Experimental techniques ===
Set of NMR spectra from a host–guest titration

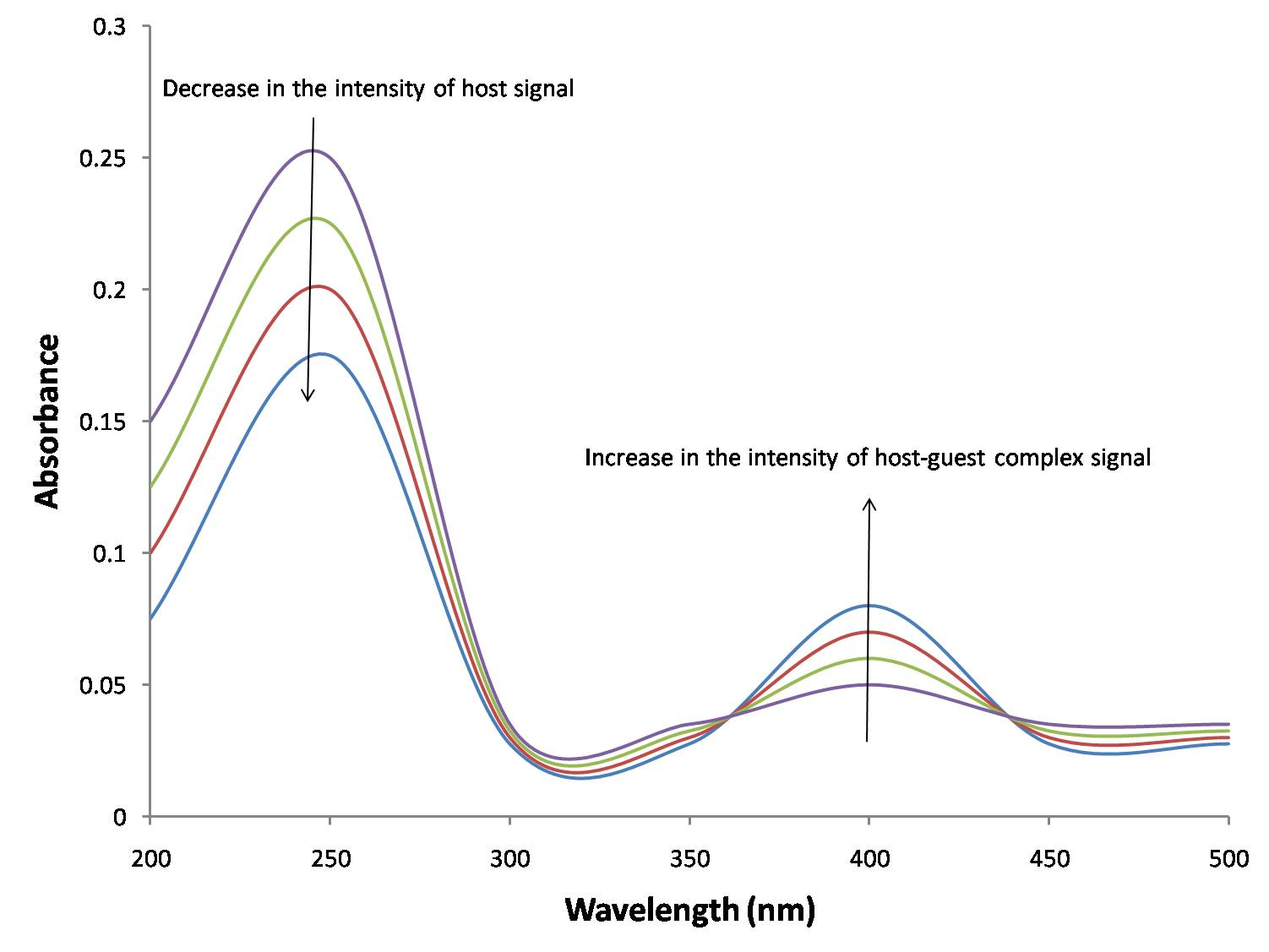
Typical ultraviolet–visible spectra for a host–guest system

With nuclear magnetic resonance (NMR) spectra, the observed chemical shift value, δ̅, arising from a given atom contained in a reagent molecule and one or more complexes of that reagent, will be the concentration-weighted average of all shifts of those chemical species. Chemical exchange is assumed to be rapid on the NMR time-scale.

Using UV–Vis spectroscopy, the absorbance of each species is proportional to the concentration of that species, according to the Beer–Lambert law:
$$A_\lambda = \ell\sum_{i = 1}^N \varepsilon_{i,\lambda} c_i$$
where lambda is a wavelength, ℓ is the optical path length of the cuvette which contains the solution of the N compounds (chromophores), 𝜀_{i,𝜆} is the molar absorbance (also known as the extinction coefficient) of the ith chemical species at the wavelength $\lambda$, and c_{i} is its concentration. When concentrations are calculated and absorbance is measured for samples with various concentrations of host and guest, the Beer–Lambert law provides a set of equations, at a given wavelength, that can be solved by a linear least-squares process for the unknown extinction coefficient values at that wavelength.

Host–guest structures can be probed by their luminescence. A rigid matrix protects emitters from being quenched, extending the lifetime of phosphorescence. In this circumstance, α-CD and CB can be used, in which the phosphor serves as a guest to interact with the host. For example, when 4-phenylpyridium derivatives interacted with CB, and copolymerized with acrylamide, the resulting polymer yielded ~2 seconds of phosphorescence lifetime. Additionally, Zhu et al. used crown ether and potassium ions to modify the polymer and enhance the emission of phosphorescence.

Another technique for evaluating host–guest interactions is calorimetry.

== Aspiration applications ==
Host–guest complexation is pervasive in biochemistry. Many protein hosts recognize and hence selectively bind other biomolecules. When the protein host is an enzyme, the guests are called substrates.

=== Self-healing ===
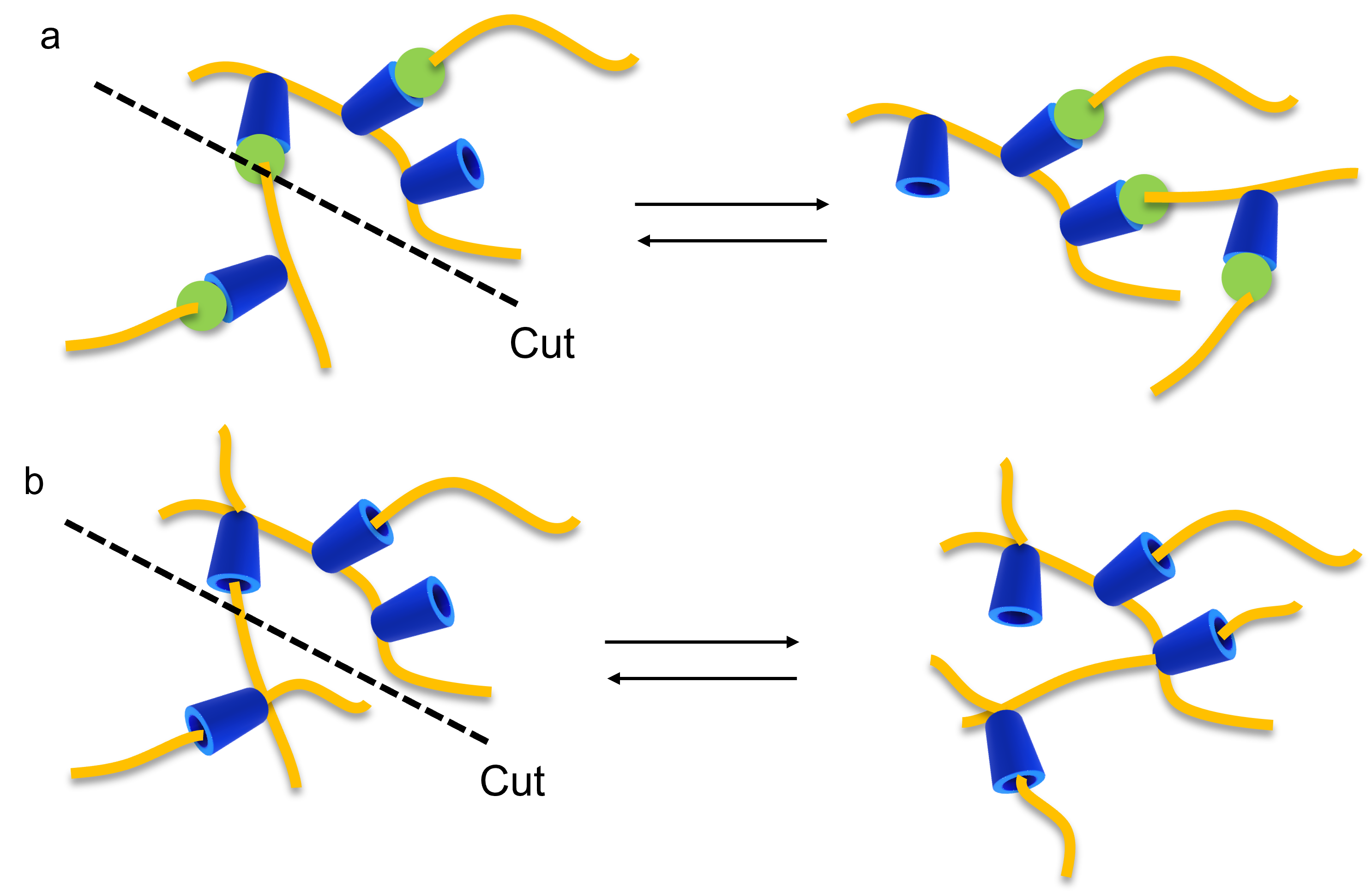
Self-healing mechanism of host–guest interaction by (a) using host–small-guest molecule and (b) host–polymer. Redrawn from source material.

A self-healing hydrogel can be constructed from modified cyclodextrin and adamantane. Another strategy is to use the threading interaction of a host molecule onto a polymer backbone. If the threading process is fast enough, self-healing can also be achieved.

=== Encapsulation and release: fragrances and drugs ===
Cyclodextrin forms inclusion compounds with fragrances which are more stable towards exposure to light and air. When incorporated into textiles, the fragrance lasts much longer due to the slow-release action.

Photolytically sensitive caged compounds have been examined as containers for releasing drugs or reagents.

=== Encryption ===
An encryption system constructed by pillar[5]arene, spiropyran, and pentanenitrile (free state and grafted to polymer) was created by Wang et al. After UV irradiation, spiropyran transforms into merocyanine. When visible light was shined on the material, the merocyanine close to the pillar[5]arene-free pentanenitrile complex had faster transformation to spiropyran, whereas the one close to pillar[5]arene-grafted pentanenitrile complex has much slower transformation rate. This spiropyran–merocyanine transformation can be used for message encryption. Another strategy is based on the metallacages and polycyclic aromatic hydrocarbons. Information could be encrypted using fluorescence emission differences between the complex and the cages.

=== Mechanical properties ===
Although some host–guest interactions are not strong, increasing the amount of the host–guest interaction can improve the mechanical properties of the materials. As an example, threading host molecules onto a polymer is a commonly used strategy for increasing the polymer's mechanical properties. It takes time for the host molecules to de-thread from the polymer, which can be a way of energy dissipation. Another method is to use the slow exchange host–guest interaction. Though the slow exchange improves the mechanical properties, self-healing properties will be sacrificed.

=== Sensing ===
Silicon surfaces functionalized with tetraphosphonate cavitands have been used to singularly detect sarcosine in water and urine solutions.

Traditionally, chemical sensing has been approached with a system that contains an indicator covalently bound to a receptor though a linker. Once the analyte binds, the indicator changes color or fluoresces. This technique is called the indicator–spacer–receptor approach (ISR). In contrast to ISR, indicator-displacement assay (IDA) utilizes a non-covalent interaction between a receptor (the host), indicator, and an analyte (the guest). Similar to ISR, IDA also utilizes colorimetric (C-IDA) and fluorescence (F-IDA) indicators. In an IDA assay, a receptor is incubated with the indicator. When the analyte is added to the mixture, the indicator is released to the environment. Once the indicator is released it either changes color (C-IDA) or fluoresces (F-IDA).

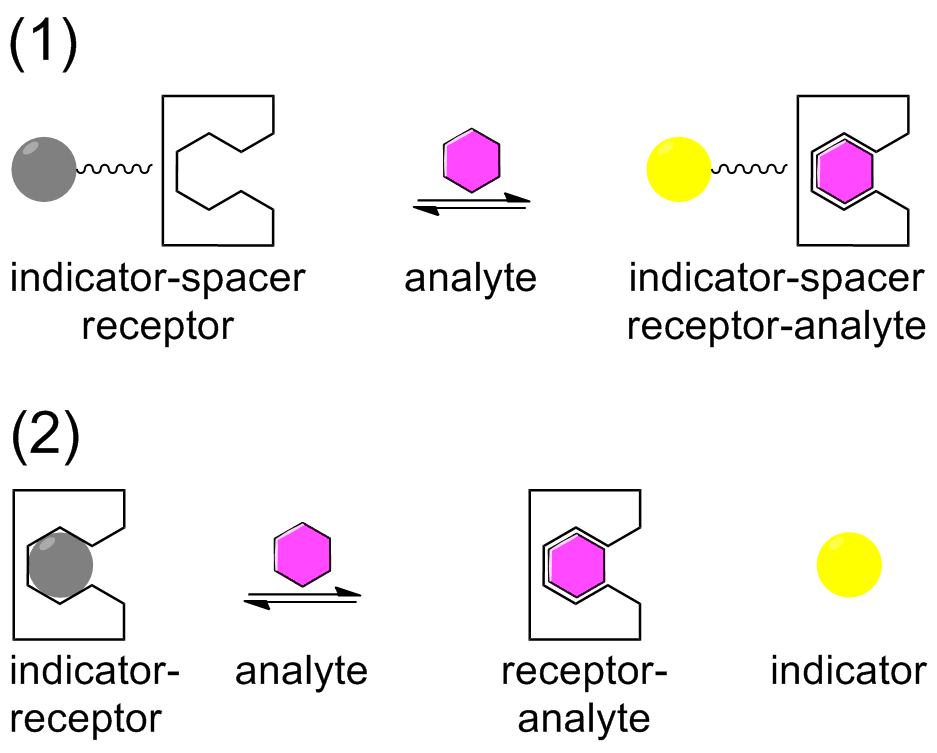
Types of chemosensors: (1) indicator–spacer–receptor (ISR) (2) indicator-displacement assay (IDA)

IDA offers several advantages versus the traditional ISR chemical sensing approach. First, it does not require the indicator to be covalently bound to the receptor. Secondly, since there is no covalent bond, various indicators can be used with the same receptor. Lastly, the assay may be used in diverse media.

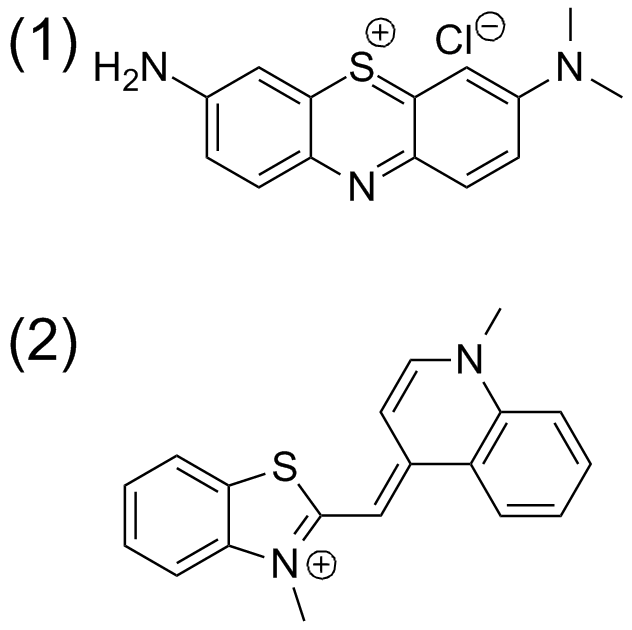
Indicator-displacement assay indicators: (1) azure A (2) thiazole orange

Chemical sensing techniques such as C-IDA have biological implications. For example, protamine is a coagulant that is routinely administered after cardiopulmonary surgery that counteracts the anti-coagulant activity of heparin. In order to quantify the protamine in plasma samples, a colorimetric displacement assay is used. Azure A dye is blue when it is unbound, but when it is bound to heparin it shows a purple color. The binding between Azure A and heparin is weak and reversible. This allows protamine to displace Azure A. Once the dye is liberated it displays a purple color. The degree to which the dye is displaced is proportional to the amount of protamine in the plasma.

F-IDA has been used by Kwalczykowski et al. to monitor the activities of helicase in E. coli. In this study they used thiazole orange as the indicator. The helicase unwinds the dsDNA to make ssDNA. The fluorescence intensity of thiazole orange has a greater affinity for dsDNA than ssDNA and its fluorescence intensity is higher when it is bound to dsDNA than when it is unbound.

=== Conformational switching ===
A crystalline solid has been traditionally viewed as a static entity where the movements of its atomic components are limited to its vibrational equilibrium. As seen by the transformation of graphite to diamond, solid-to-solid transformation can occur under physical or chemical pressure. It has been proposed that the transformation from one crystal arrangement to another occurs in a cooperative manner. Most of these studies have been focused on studying an organic or metal-organic framework. In addition to studies of macromolecular crystalline transformation, there are also studies of single-crystal molecules that can change their conformation in the presence of organic solvents. An organometallic complex has been shown to morph into various orientations depending on whether or not it is exposed to solvent vapors.

=== Environmental applications ===
Host guest systems have been proposed to remove hazardous materials. Certain calix[4]arenes bind cesium-137 ions, which could in principle be applied to clean up radioactive wastes. Some receptors bind carcinogens.

=== Alcohol ===
According to food chemist Udo Pollmer of the European Institute of Food and Nutrition Sciences in Munich, alcohol can be molecularly encapsulated in cyclodextrines, a sugar derivate. In this way, encapsuled in small capsules, the fluid can be handled as a powder. The cyclodextrines can absorb an estimated 60 percent of their own weight in alcohol. A US patent has been registered for the process as early as 1974.

== See also ==
- Cryptophane
- Catenane
