= List of conjugated polymers =

List of conductive polymers
Class	Abbr.	Polymer	Typical dopants	Peak conductivity	Peak emission
	PA	Polyacetylene			
	PT	Polythiophene	Iodine, bromine, Trifluoroacetic acid, propionic acid, sulfonic acids	1000 S/cm	
	P3AT	Poly(3-alkylthiophenes)			
	PPy	Polypyrrole			
	PITN	Poly(isothianaphthene)			
	PEDOT	Poly(3,4-ethylenedioxythiophene)			
PPV	MEH-PPV	alkoxy-substituted poly(p-phenylene vinylene)			orange-red
PPV	BCHA-PPV	poly(2,5-bis(cholestanoxy) phenylene vinylene)			orange-yellow
PPV	PPV	poly(p-phenylene vinylene)			yellow-green
PPV		poly(2,5-dialkoxy) paraphenylene vinylene			
PPV		poly[(1,4-phenylene-1,2-diphenylvinylene)]			green
PPV	MDMO-PPV	poly(3',7'-dimethyloctyloxy phenylene vinylene)			red
	PPP	Polyparaphenylene			
	LPPP	ladder-type polyparaphenylene			
	PPS	Polyparaphenylene sulphide			
	PHT	polyheptadiyne			
	P3HT	Poly(3-hexylthiophene)			
		Poly(3-octylthiophene)			red
		Poly(3-cyclohexylthiophene)			green
		Poly(3-methyl-4-cyclohexylthiophene)			blue
	PANI	Polyaniline			
	PPE	Poly(2,5-dialkoxy-1,4-phenyleneethynylene)			yellow
		Poly(2-decyloxy-1,4-phenylene)			410 nm (dark blue)
PFO		Poly(9,9-dioctylfluorene)			blue
		Polyquinoline			blue

== See also ==
- Light emitting polymers in OLEDs
- Conductive polymer
- Electroluminescence
