= Molecular electronic transition =

Excitation of electrons in a molecule to a higher energy level

In theoretical chemistry, molecular electronic transitions take place when electrons in a molecule are excited from one energy level to a higher energy level. The energy change associated with this transition provides information on the structure of the molecule and determines many of its properties, such as colour. The relationship between the energy involved in the electronic transition and the frequency of radiation is given by Planck's relation.

== Organic molecules and other molecules ==
The electronic transitions in organic compounds and some other compounds can be determined by ultraviolet–visible spectroscopy, provided that transitions in the ultraviolet (UV) or visible range of the electromagnetic spectrum exist for the compound. Electrons occupying a HOMO (highest-occupied molecular orbital) of a sigma bond (σ) can get excited to the LUMO (lowest-unoccupied molecular orbital) of that bond. This process is denoted as a σ → σ* transition. Likewise, promotion of an electron from a pi-bonding orbital (π) to an antibonding pi orbital (π*) is denoted as a π → π* transition. Auxochromes with free electron pairs (denoted as "n") have their own transitions, as do aromatic pi bond transitions. Sections of molecules which can undergo such detectable electron transitions can be referred to as chromophores, since such transitions absorb electromagnetic radiation (light), which may be hypothetically perceived as color somewhere in the electromagnetic spectrum. The following molecular electronic transitions exist:

$$\begin{array}{rcl}
\sigma &\rightarrow& \sigma^* \\
\pi &\rightarrow&  \pi^* \\
\mathrm n &\rightarrow& \sigma^* \\
\mathrm n &\rightarrow& \pi^* \\
\text{aromatic } \pi &\rightarrow& \text{aromatic } \pi^*
\end{array}$$

In addition to these assignments, electronic transitions also have so-called bands associated with them. The following bands are defined (by A. Burawoy in 1930):

- The R-band (from German radikalartig 'radical-like');
- The K-band (from German konjugiert 'conjugated');
- The B-band (from benzoic);
- The E-band (from ethylenic).

For example, the absorption spectrum for ethane shows a σ → σ* transition at 135 nm and that of water a n → σ* transition at 167 nm with an extinction coefficient of 7,000. Benzene has three aromatic π → π* transitions; two E-bands at 180 and 200 nm and one B-band at 255 nm with extinction coefficients respectively 60,000, 8,000 and 215. These absorptions are not narrow bands but are generally broad because the electronic transitions are superimposed on the other molecular energy states.

== Solvent shifts ==
The electronic transitions of molecules in solution can depend strongly on the type of solvent with additional bathochromic shifts or hypsochromic shifts.

== Line spectra ==
Spectral lines are associated with atomic electronic transitions and polyatomic gases have their own absorption band system.

== See also ==
- Atomic electron transition
- Resonance Raman spectroscopy
