= Francis Scott =

Francis Scott may refer to:

- Francis Scott, 2nd Earl of Buccleuch (1626–1651), Scottish nobleman
- Francis Scott, 2nd Duke of Buccleuch (1694–1751), Scottish nobleman
- Francis Scott, Earl of Dalkeith (1721–1750), Scottish nobleman
- F. R. Scott (1899–1985), Canadian poet, constitutional expert and intellectual
- Francis Scott (British politician) (1806–1884), British politician
- Francis George Scott (1880–1958), Scottish composer
- Francis Cunningham Scott (1834–1902), British Army officer
- Francis Leslie Scott (1928–2008), Irish chemist
- Sir Francis Scott, 3rd Baronet (1824–1863), English landowner

== See also ==
- Frank Scott (disambiguation)
