= Woodward's rules =

Rules predicting maximum absorption wavelengths

Woodward's rules, named after Robert Burns Woodward and also known as Woodward–Fieser rules (for Louis Fieser) are several sets of empirically derived rules which attempt to predict the wavelength of the absorption maximum (λ_{max}) in an ultraviolet–visible spectrum of a given compound. Inputs used in the calculation are the type of chromophores present, the auxochromes (substituents on the chromophores, and solvent. Examples are conjugated carbonyl compounds, conjugated dienes, and polyenes.

== Implementation ==
One set of Woodward–Fieser rules for dienes is outlined in table 1. A diene is either homoannular with both double bonds contained in one ring or heteroannular with two double bonds distributed between two rings.

Table 1. Rules for wavelength of maximum diene absorption
Structural feature	λ_{max} effect (in nanometers)
Base value for heteroannular diene	214
Base value for homoannular diene	253
Increments
Double bond extending conjugation	+ 30
Alkyl substituent or ring residue	+ 5
Exocyclic double bond	+ 5
acetate group	+ 0
Ether group	+ 6
Thioether group	+ 30
bromine, chlorine	+ 5
secondary amine group	+ 60

With the aid of these rules the UV absorption maximum can be predicted, for example in these two compounds:

In the compound on the left, the base value is 214 nm (a heteroannular diene). This diene group has 4 alkyl substituents (labeled 1,2,3,4) and the double bond in one ring is exocyclic to the other (adding 5 nm for an exocyclic double bond). In the compound on the right, the diene is homoannular with 4 alkyl substituents. Both double bonds in the central B ring are exocyclic with respect to rings A and C.

For polyenes having more than 4 conjugated double bonds one must use Fieser–Kuhn rules.
