= Polyfluorene =

Identifiers
| CAS Number | 95270-88-5 |
| ChemSpider | none |

Properties
| Chemical formula | (C_{13}H_{8})_{n} |
| Molar mass | Variable |
- Except where otherwise noted, data are given for materials in their standard state (at 25 °C [77 °F], 100 kPa). verify (what is ?) Infobox references

Polyfluorene is a polymer with formula (C_{13}H_{8})_{n}, consisting of fluorene units linked in a linear chain — specifically, at carbon atoms 2 and 7 in the standard fluorene numbering. It can also be described as a chain of benzene rings linked in para positions (a polyparaphenylene) with an extra methylene bridge connecting every pair of rings.

The two benzene rings in each unit make polyfluorene an aromatic hydrocarbon, specifically conjugated polymer, and give it notable optical and electrical properties, such as efficient photoluminescence.

When spoken about as a class, polyfluorenes are derivatives of this polymer, obtained by replacing some of the hydrogen atoms by other chemical groups, and/or by substituting other monomers for some fluorene units. These polymers are being investigated for possible use in light-emitting diodes, field-effect transistors, plastic solar cells, and other organic electronic applications. They stand out among other luminescent conjugated polymers because the wavelength of their light output can be tuned through the entire visible spectrum by appropriate choice of the substituents.

== History ==
Fluorene, the repeat unit in polyfluorene derivatives, was isolated from coal tar and discovered by Marcellin Berthelot prior to 1883. Its name originates from its interesting fluorescence (and not to fluorine, which is not one of its elements).

Fluorene became the subject of chemical-structure related color variation (visible rather than luminescent), among other things, throughout the early to mid-20th century. Since it was an interesting chromophore researchers wanted to understand which parts of the molecule were chemically reactive, and how substituting these sites influenced the color. For instance, by adding various electron donating or electron accepting moieties to fluorene, and by reacting with bases, researchers were able to change the color of the molecule.

The physical properties of the fluorene molecule were recognizably desirable for polymers; as early as the 1970s researchers began incorporating this moiety into polymers. For instance, because of fluorene’s rigid, planar shape a polymer containing fluorene was shown to exhibit enhanced thermo-mechanical stability. However, more promising was integrating the optoelectronic properties of fluorene into a polymer. Reports of the oxidative polymerization of fluorene (into a fully conjugated form) exist from at least 1972. However, it was not until after the highly publicized high conductivity of doped polyacetylene, presented in 1977 by Heeger, MacDiarmid and Shirakawa, that substantial interest in the electronic properties of conjugated polymers took off.

As interest in conducting plastics grew, fluorene again found application. The aromatic nature of fluorene makes it an excellent candidate component of a conducting polymer because it can stabilize and conduct a charge; in the early 1980s fluorene was electropolymerized into conjugated polymer films with conductivities of 10^{−4} S cm^{−1}. The optical properties (such as variable luminescence and visible light spectrum absorption) that accompany the extended conjugation in polymers of fluorene have become increasingly attractive for device applications. Throughout the 1990s and into the 2000s, a number of devices such as organic light-emitting diodes (OLEDs), organic solar cells., organic thin film transistors, and biosensors have all taken advantage of the luminescent, electronic and absorptive properties of polyfluorenes.

== Properties ==
The fluorene molecule is most commonly linked at the 2 and 7 positions in polyfluorene derivatives. Also, the 9 position is typically where side chains are attached.

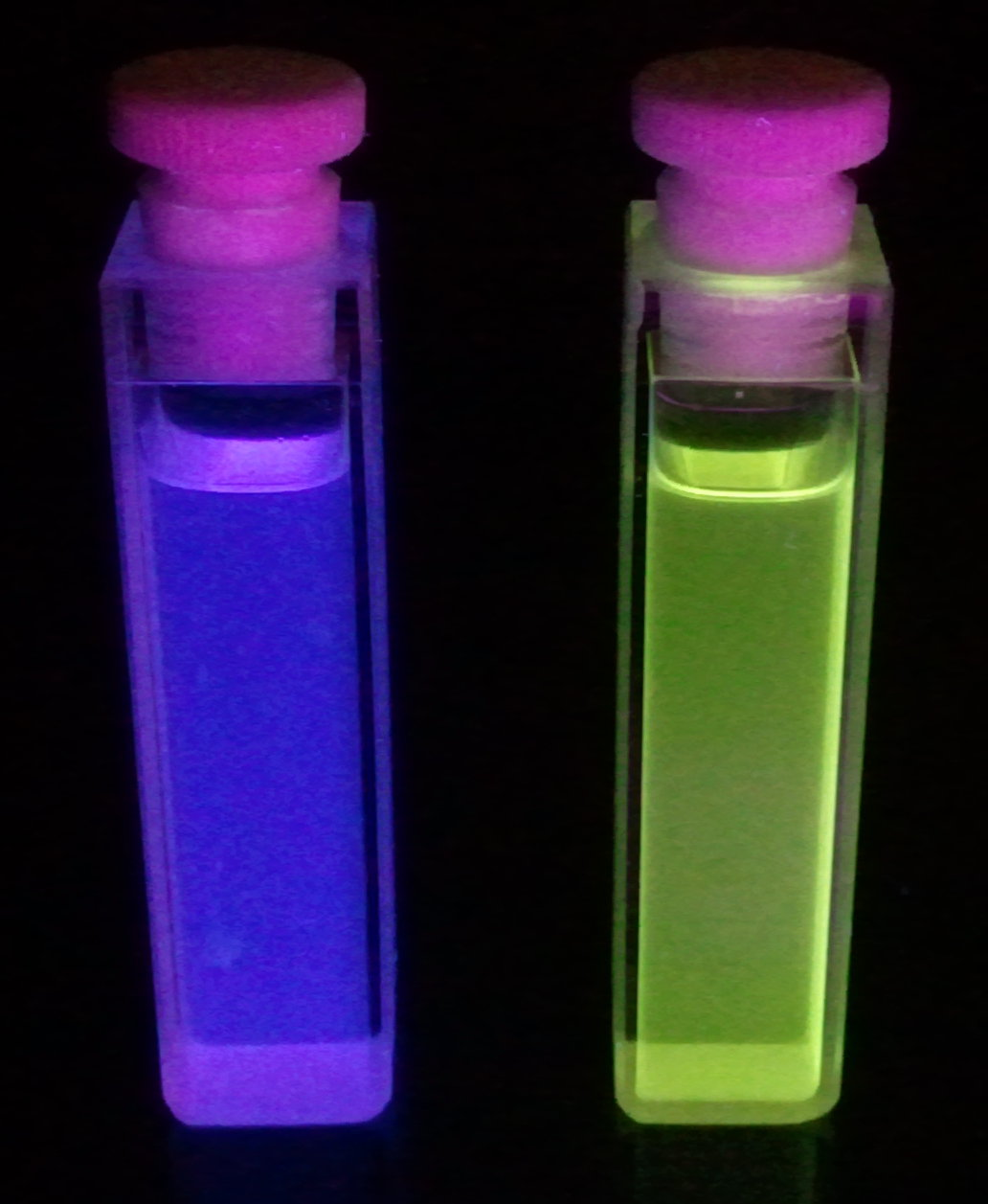
This is the photoluminescence of two very similarly structured polyfluorene derivatives. The one on the left (purple) is a copolymerization of a fluorene derivative, benzene and oxadiazole molecules and the one on the right (light green) has the structure directly below this image.

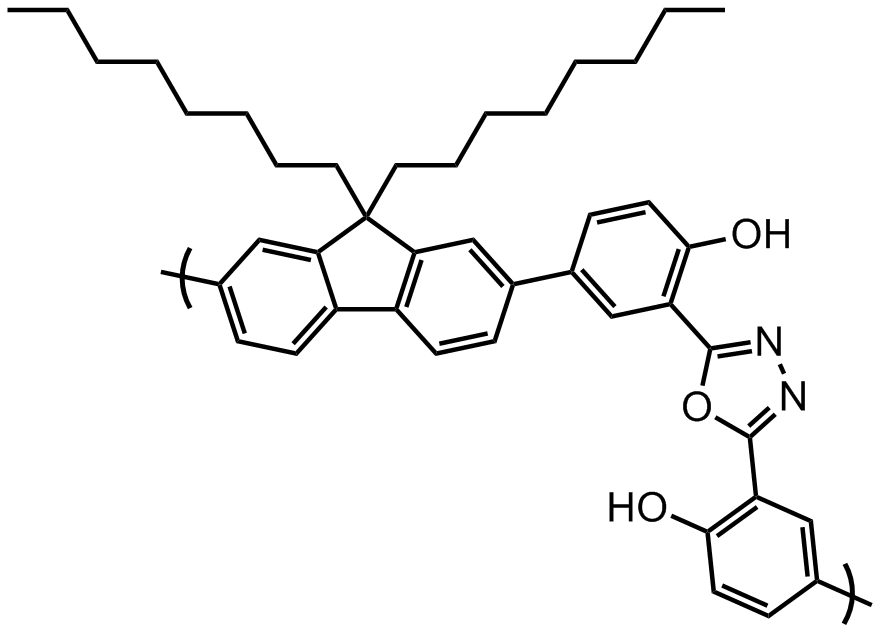
This polyfluorene derivative photoluminesces light green (the vial on the right in the image above), the alcohol (-OH) side chains can participate in ESIPT with the neighboring oxadiazole nitrogens causing a red-shifted emission. The meta-linkages in the backbone impart solubility in lieu of multiple side chains.

Polyfluorenes are an important class of polymers which have the potential to act as both electroactive and photoactive materials. This in part due to the shape of fluorene. Fluorene is generally planar; p-orbital overlap at the linkage between its two benzene rings results in conjugation across the molecule. This in turn allows for a reduced band gap as the excited state molecular orbitals are delocalized. Since the degree of delocalization and the spatial location of the orbitals on the molecule is influenced by the electron donating (or withdrawing) character of its substituents, the band gap energy can be varied. This chemical control over the band gap directly influences the color of the molecule by limiting the energies of light which it absorbs.

Interest in polyfluorene derivatives has increased because of their high photoluminescence quantum efficiency, high thermal stability, and their facile color tunability, obtained by introducing low-band-gap co-monomers. Research in this field has increased significantly due to its potential application in tuning organic light-emitting diodes (OLEDs). In OLEDs, polyfluorenes are desirable because they are the only family of conjugated polymers that can emit colors spanning the entire visible range with high efficiency and low operating voltage. Furthermore, polyfluorenes are relatively soluble in most solvents, making them ideal for general applications.

Another important quality of polyfluorenes is their thermotropic liquid crystallinity which allows the polymers to align on rubbed polyimide layers. Thermotropic liquid crystallinity refers to the polymers' ability to exhibit a phase transition into the liquid crystal phase as the temperature is changed. This is very important to the development of liquid crystal displays (LCDs) because the synthesis of liquid crystal displays requires that the liquid-crystal molecules at the two glass surfaces of the cell be aligned parallel to the two polarizer foils. This can only be done by coating the inner-surfaces of the cell with a thin, transparent film of polyamide which is then rubbed with a velvet cloth. Microscopic grooves are then generated in the polyamide layer and the liquid crystal in contact with the polyamide, the polyfluorene, can align in the rubbing direction. In addition to LCDs, polyfluorene can also be used to synthesize light-emitting diodes (LEDs). Polyfluorene has led to LEDs that can emit polarized light with polarization ratios of more than 20 and with brightness of 100 cd m^{−2}. Even though this is impressive, it is not sufficient for general applications.

=== Challenges associated with polyfluorenes ===
Polyfluorenes often show both excimer and aggregate formation upon thermal annealing or when current is passed through them. Excimer formation involves the generation of dimerized units of the polymer which emit light at lower energies than the polymer itself. This hinders the use of polyfluorenes for most applications, including light-emitting diodes (LED). When excimer or aggregate formation occurs this lowers the efficiency of the LEDs by decreasing the efficiency of charge carrier recombination. Excimer formation also causes a red shift in the emission spectrum.

Polyfluorenes can also undergo decomposition. There are two known ways in which decomposition can occur. The first involves the oxidation of the polymer that leads to the formation of an aromatic ketone, quenching the fluorescence. The second decomposition process results in aggregation leading to a red-shifted fluorescence, reduced intensity, exciton migration and relaxation through excimers.

Researchers have attempted to eliminate excimer formation and enhance the efficiency of polyfluorenes by copolymerizing polyfluorene with anthracene and end-capping polyfluorenes with bulky groups which could sterically hinder excimer formation. Additionally, researchers have tried adding large substituents at the nine position of the fluorene in order to inhibit excimer and aggregate formation. Furthermore, researchers have tried to improve LEDs by synthesizing fluorene-triarylamine copolymers and other multilayer devices that are based on polyfluorenes that can be cross-linked. These have been found to have brighter fluorescence and reasonable efficiencies.

Aggregation has also been combated by varying the chemical structure. For example, when conjugated polymers aggregate, which is natural in the solid state, their emission can be self-quenched, reducing luminescent quantum yields and reducing luminescent device performance. In opposition to this tendency, researchers have used tri-functional monomers to create highly branched polyfluorenes which do not aggregate due to the bulkiness of the substituents. This design strategy has achieved luminescent quantum yields of 42% in the solid state. This solution reduces the ease of processability of the material because branched polymers have increased chain entanglement and poor solubility.

Another problem commonly encountered by polyfluorenes is an observed broad green, parasitic emission which detracts from the color purity and efficiency needed for an OLED. Initially attributed to excimer emission, this green emission has been shown to be due to the formation of ketone defects along the fluorene polymer backbone (oxidation of the nine position on the monomer) when there are incomplete substitution at the nine positions of the fluorene monomer. Routes to combat this involve ensuring full substitution of the monomer’s active site, or including aromatic substituents. These solutions may present structures that lack optimal bulkiness or may be synthetically difficult.

== Synthesis and design ==
Conjugated polymers, such as polyfluorene, can be designed and synthesized with different properties for a wide variety of applications. The color of the molecules can be designed through synthetic control over the electron donating or withdrawing character of the substituents on fluorene or the comonomers in polyfluorene.

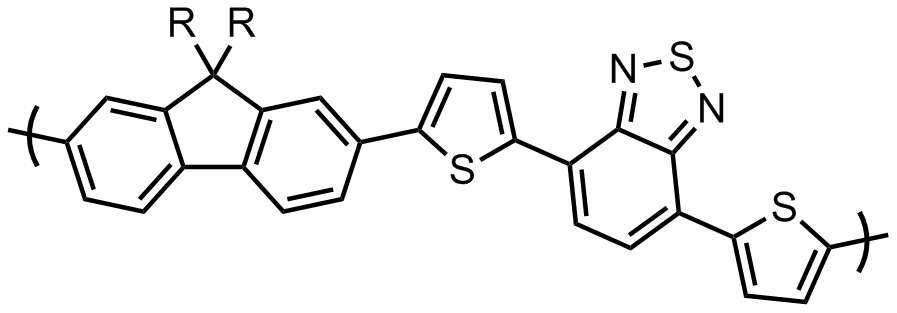
The structure of a common low band-gap polyflourene derivative. It has electron donating fluorene (left) and electron withdrawing benzothiadiazole (mid right between two thiophenes) monomers which allow for a reduced band gap due to charge transfer absorption.

Solubility of the polymers are important because solution state processing is very common. Since conjugated polymers, with their planar structure, tend to aggregate, bulky side chains are added (to the 9 position of fluorene) to increase the solubility of the polymer.

=== Oxidative polymerization ===
The earliest polymerizations of fluorene were oxidative polymerization with AlCl_{3} or FeCl_{3}, and more commonly electropolymerization. Electropolymerization is an easy route to obtain thin, insoluble conducting polymer films. However, this technique has a few disadvantages in that it does not provide controlled chain growth polymerizations, and processing and characterization are difficult as a result of its insolubility. Oxidative polymerization produces a similarly poor site-selectivity on the monomer for chain growth resulting in poor control over the regularity of the polymers structure. However, oxidative polymerization does produce soluble polymers (from side-chain containing monomers) which are more easily characterized with nuclear magnetic resonance.

=== Cross coupling polymerizations ===
The design of polymeric properties requires great control over the structure of the polymer. For instance, low band gap polymers require regularly alternating electron donating and electron accepting monomers. More recently, many popular cross-coupling chemistries have been applied to polyfluorenes and have enabled controlled polymerization; Palladium-catalyzed coupling reactions such as Suzuki coupling, Heck coupling, etc., as well as nickel catalyzed Yamamoto and Grignard coupling reactions have been applied to polymerization of fluorene derivatives. Such routes have enabled excellent control over the properties of polyfluorenes; the fluorene-thiophene-benzothiadiazole copolymer shown above, with a band gap of 1.78 eV when the side chains are alkoxy, appears blue because it is absorbing in the red wavelengths.

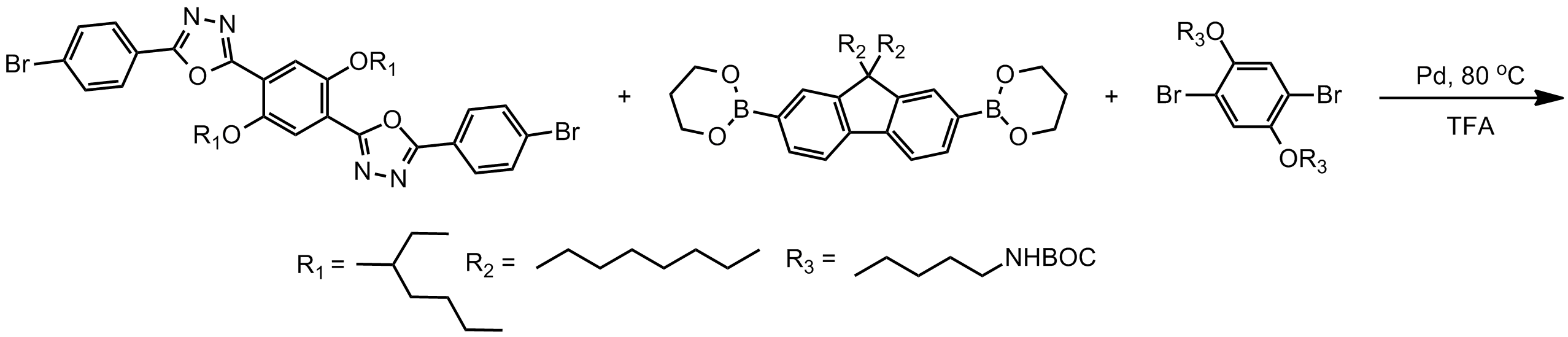
The monomers used to obtain the complex polyfluorene derivative (copolymer of fluorene, oxadiazole and benzene). This Suzuki polymerization utilizes a palladium cross coupling between monomers with halogens and boronic esters.

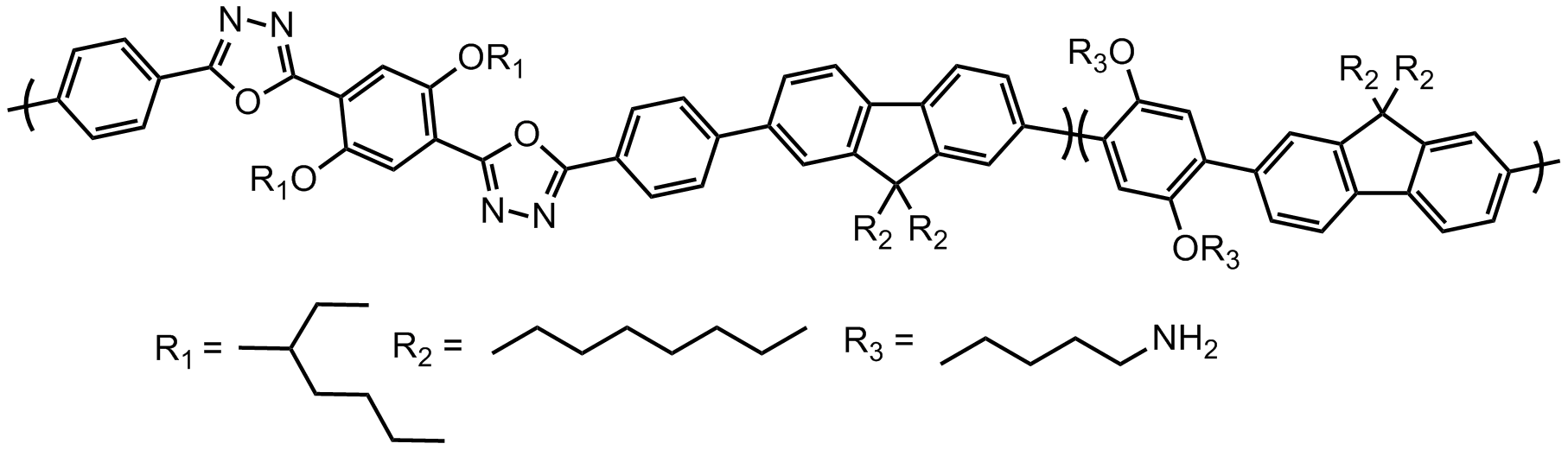
The product of the above reaction (the purple substance shown in the photo higher up)

=== Design ===
Modern coupling chemistries allow other properties of polyfluorenes to be controlled through implementation of complex molecular designs.

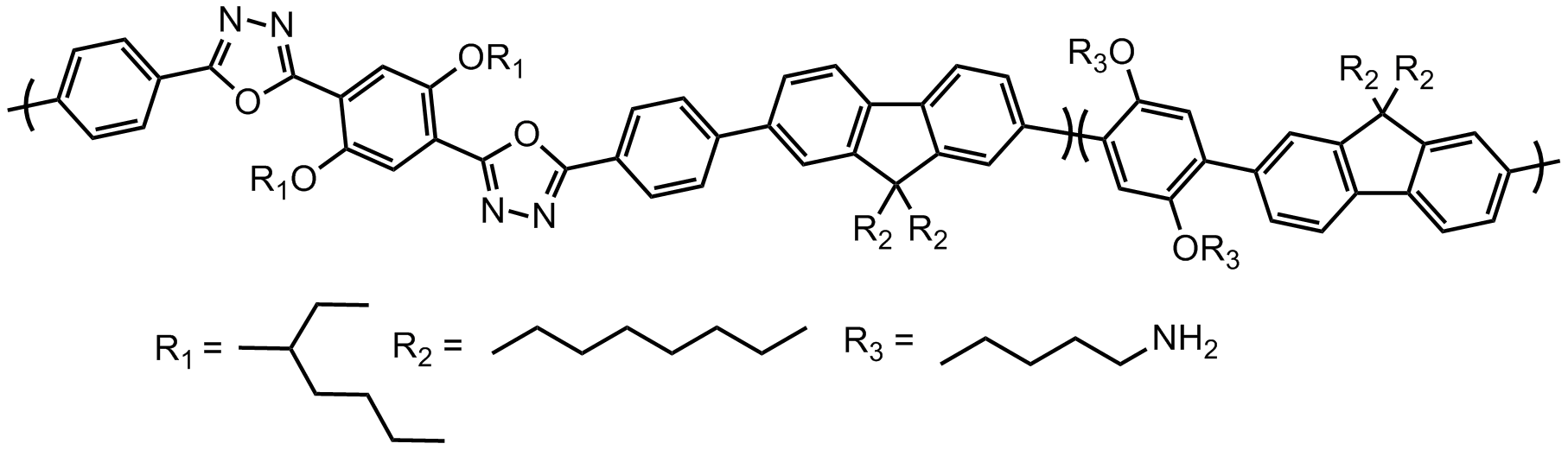
The structure of a complex polyflourene derivative. It contains multiple monomers, including fluorene on the far right, which give it desirable characteristics

The above polymer structure pictured has excellent photoluminescent quantum yields (partly due to its fluorene monomer) excellent stability (due to its oxadiazole comonomer) good solubility (due to its many and branched alkyl side chains) and has an amine functionalized side chain for ease of tethering to other molecules or to a substrate. The luminescent color of polyfluorenes can be changed, for example, (from blue to green-yellow) by adding functional groups which participate in excited state intramolecular proton transfer. Exchanging the alkoxy side chains for alcohol side groups allows for energy dissipation (and a red-shift in emission) through reversible transfer of a proton from the alcohol to the nitrogen (on the oxadiazole). These complicated molecular structures were engineered to have these properties and were only able to be realized through careful control of their ordering and side group functionality.

== Applications ==
=== Organic light-emitting diodes (OLEDs) ===
In recent years a number of industrial efforts have focused on tuning the color of lights using polyfluorenes. It was found that by doping green or red emitting materials into polyfluorenes one could tune the color emitted by the polymers. Since polyfluorene homopolymers emit higher energy blue light, they can transfer energy via Förster resonance energy transfer (FRET) to lower energy emitters. In addition to doping, color of polyfluorenes can be tuned by copolymerizing the fluorene monomers with other low band gap monomers. Researchers at the Dow Chemical Company synthesized several fluorene-based copolymers by alternating copolymerization using 5,5-dibromo-2,2-bithiophene which showed yellow emission and 4,7-dibromo-2,1,3-benzothiadiazole, which showed green emission. Other copolymerizations are also suitable; researchers at IBM performed random copolymerization of fluorene with 3,9(10)-dibromoperylene,4,4-dibromo-R-cyanostilbene, and 1,4-bis(2-(4-bromophenyl)-1-cyanovinyl)-2-(2-ethylhexyl)-5-methoxybenzene. Only a small amount of the co-monomer, approximately 5%, was needed to tune the emission of the polyfluorene from blue to yellow. This example further illustrates that by introducing monomers that have a lower band gap than the fluorene monomer, one can tune the color that is emitted by the polymer.

Substitution at the nine position with various moieties has also been examined as a means to control the color emitted by polyfluorene. In the past researchers have tried putting alkyl substituents on the ninth position, however it has been found that by putting bulkier groups, such as alkoxyphenyl groups, the polymers had enhanced blue emission stability and superior polymer light-emitting diode performance (compared to polymers which have alkyl substituents at the ninth position).

=== Polymer solar cells ===
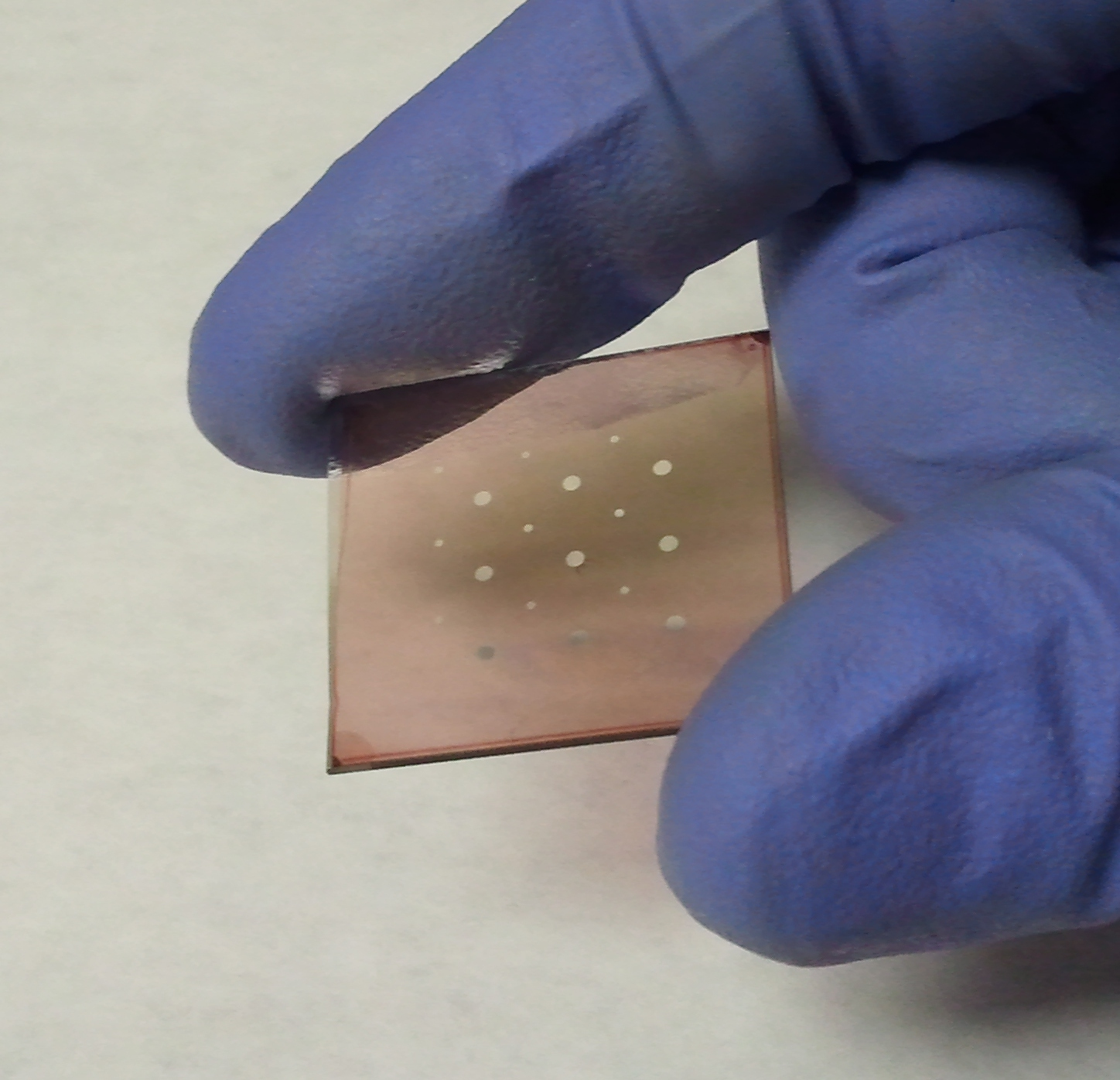
A laboratory scale polymer:PCBM blend solar cell. Polyfluorenes are utilized in similar devices.

Polyfluorenes are also used in polymer solar cells because of their affinity for property tuning. Copolymerization of fluorene with other monomers allows researchers to optimize the absorption and electronic energy levels as a means to increase the photovoltaic performance. For instance, by lowering the band gap of polyfluorenes, the absorption spectrum of the polymer can be adjusted to coincide with the maximum photon flux region of the solar spectrum. This helps the solar cell absorb more of the sun's energy and to increase its energy conversion efficiency; donor-acceptor structured copolymers of fluorene have achieved efficiencies above 4% when their absorption edge was pushed to 700 nm.

The voltage of polymer solar cells has also been increased through the design of polyfluorenes. These devices are typically produced by blending electron accepting and electron donating molecules which help separate charge to produce power. In polymer blend solar cells, the voltage produced by the device is determined by the difference between the electron donating polymer’s highest occupied molecular orbital (HOMO) energy level and the electron accepting molecules lowest unoccupied molecular orbital (LUMO) energy level. By adding electron withdrawing pendant molecules to conjugated polymers, their HOMO energy level can be lowered. For instance by adding electronegative groups on the end of conjugated side chains, researchers lowered the HOMO of a polyfluorene copolymer to −5.30 eV and increased the voltage of a solar cell to 0.99 V.

Typical polymer solar cells utilize fullerene molecules as electron acceptors because of their low LUMO energy level (high electron affinity). However the tunability of polyfluorenes allows their LUMO to be lowered to a level appropriate for use as an electron acceptor. Thus, polyfluorene copolymers have also been used in polymer:polymer blend solar cells, where their electron accepting, electron conducting and light absorbing properties permit device performance.
