= Lewis conjugate =

In chemistry, a Lewis conjugate may refer to:

- The conjugate acid of a Lewis base or the conjugate base of a Lewis acid
- A molecule having a conjugated system of bonds in its Lewis structure
