= Frank Scott =

Frank Scott may refer to:

- Frank Scott (footballer) (1876–1937), English professional footballer
- Frank Scott (musician) (1921–1995), American musician and arranger
- Frank Scott (poet and legal scholar) (1899–1985), Canadian poet, intellectual, and constitutional expert
- Frank Scott Jr. (born 1983), American politician from Arkansas
- Frank A. Scott (1873–1949), American businessman and government official from Ohio
- Frank Albert Scott (1949–2005), boxer and boxing coach
- Frank Austin Scott (1848–1922), president of Rutgers College
- Frank D. Scott (1878–1951), American politician from Michigan
- Frank R. Scott (1856–1917), American politician from Maryland
- Frank S. Scott (1883–1912), first enlisted member of the United States armed forces to lose his life in an aircraft accident
- Frank Scott-Walford (c. 1866 – 1935), English football manager
- Frank Sholl Scott (1886–1952), English rugby union player and medical practitioner
- Frank Stewart Scott (1879–1943), Canadian shoe manufacturer and politician

== See also ==
- Francis Scott (disambiguation)
- Frankie Scott, fictional character in the 2023 miniseries The Continental: From the World of John Wick
- Scott Frank (born 1960), American screenwriter
