= Carceplex =

Chemical structure able to contain another species within itself

"Image of calix-[4]-arene carceplex"

In host–guest chemistry, a carceplex is a class of chemical structures in the carcerand family that are hinged, and can be closed using reagents that react with the carceplex and trap precursors of reactive intermediates, and are unreactive with the trapped precursor or reactive intermediate. This is useful for determining the spectroscopic and crystallographic properties of reactive intermediates in relative isolation, particularly compounds prone to dimerization like cyclobutadiene.
