= Auxochrome =

Functional group which changes a molecule's ability to absorb light

In organic chemistry, an auxochrome (from Ancient Greek αὐξάνω (auxanō) 'increase' and χρῶμα (chrōma) 'colour') is a group of atoms attached to a chromophore which modifies the ability of that chromophore to absorb light. They themselves fail to produce the colour, but instead intensify the colour of the chromogen when present along with the chromophores in an organic compound. Examples include the hydroxyl (−OH), amino (−NH_{2}), aldehyde (−CHO), and methyl mercaptan groups (−SCH_{3}).

An auxochrome is a functional group of atoms with one or more lone pairs of electrons when attached to a chromophore, alters both the wavelength and intensity of absorption. If these groups are in direct conjugation with the pi-system of the chromophore, they may increase the wavelength at which the light is absorbed and as a result intensify the absorption. A feature of these auxochromes is the presence of at least one lone pair of electrons which can be viewed as extending the conjugated system by resonance.

== Effects on chromophore ==
It increases the colour of any organic compound. For example, benzene does not display colour as it does not have a chromophore; but nitrobenzene is pale yellow colour because of the presence of a nitro group (−NO_{2}) which acts as a chromophore. But p-hydroxynitrobenzene exhibits a deep yellow colour, in which the −OH group acts as an auxochrome. Here the auxochrome (−OH) is conjugated with the chromophore −NO_{2}. Similar behavior is seen in azobenzene which has a red colour, but p-hydroxyazobenzene is dark red in colour.

The presence of an auxochrome in a chromogen is essential to make a dye. However, if an auxochrome is present in the meta position to the chromophore, it does not affect the colour.

An auxochrome is known as a functional group that produces a bathochromic shift, also known as red shift because it increases the wavelength of absorption, therefore moving closer to infrared light. Woodward−Fieser rules estimate the shift in wavelength of maximum absorption for several auxochromes attached to a conjugated system in an organic molecule.

An auxochrome helps a dye to bind to the object that is to be coloured. Electrolytic dissociation of the auxochrome group helps in binding and it is due to this reason a basic substance takes an acidic dye.

== Explanation for the colour modification ==
A molecule exhibits colour because it absorbs colours only of certain frequencies and reflects or transmits others. They are capable of absorbing and emitting light of various frequencies. Light waves with frequency very close to their natural frequency are absorbed readily. This phenomenon, known as resonance, means that the molecule can absorb radiation of a particular frequency which is the same as the frequency of electron movement within the molecule. The chromophore is the part of the molecule where the energy difference between two different molecular orbitals falls within the range of the visible spectrum and hence absorbs some particular colours from visible light. Hence the molecule appears coloured. When auxochromes are attached to the molecule, the natural frequency of the chromophore gets changed and thus the colour gets modified. Different auxochromes produce different effects in the chromophore which in turn causes absorption of light from other parts of the spectrum. Normally, auxochromes which intensify the colour are chosen.

== Classification ==
There are mainly two types of auxochromes:

- Acidic: −COOH, −OH, −SO_{3}H
- Basic: −NH_{2}, −NHR, −NR_{2}
