= Louis Fieser =

American organic chemist (1899–1977)

Louis Frederick Fieser
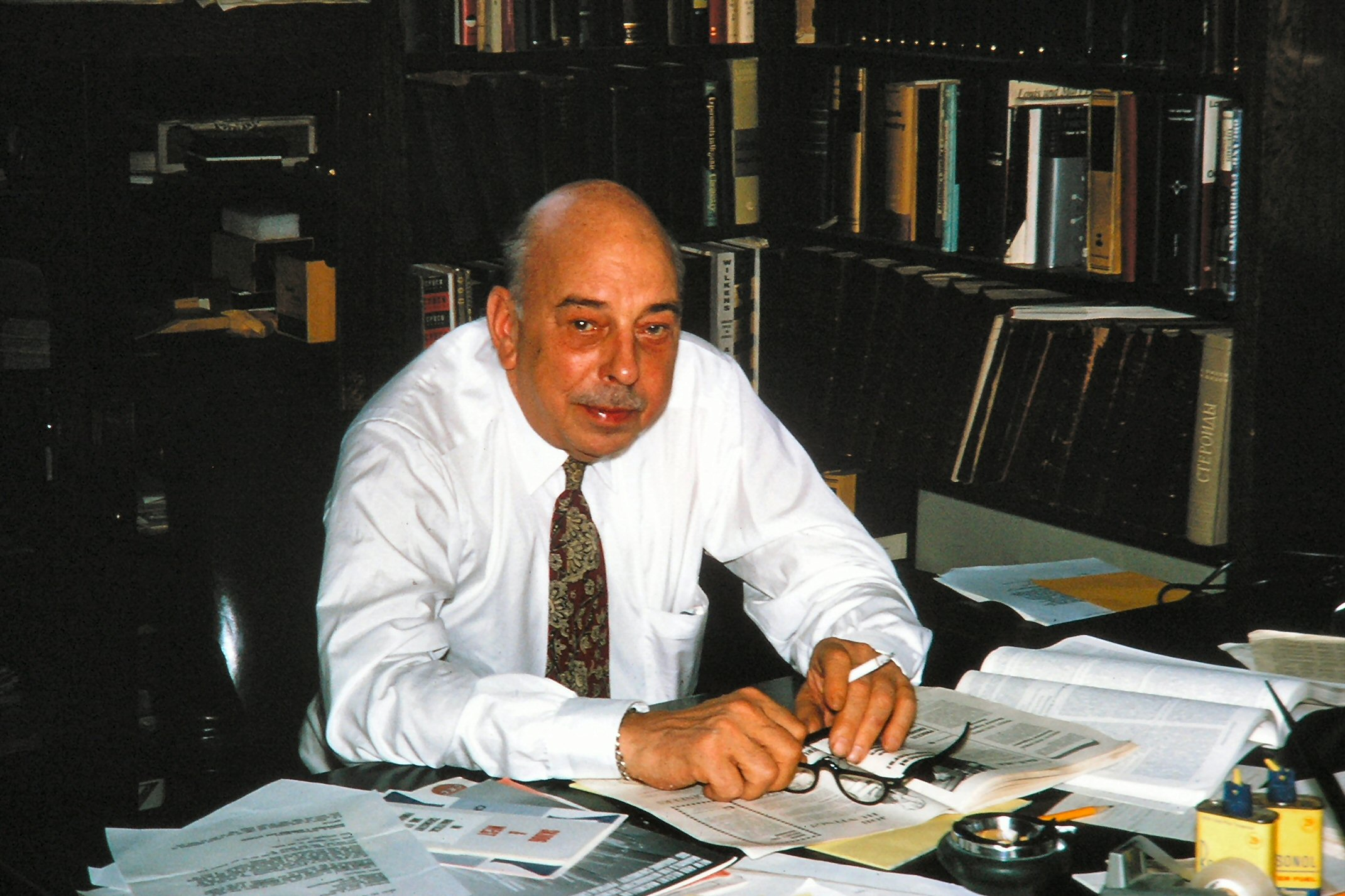
- Born: April 7, 1899; Columbus, Ohio
- Died: July 25, 1977 (aged 78); Belmont, Massachusetts
- Education: Williams College; Frankfurt University; Harvard University
- Known for: Synthesis of vitamin K Quinone; Cortisone; Woodward–Fieser rules Inventor of Napalm
- Spouse: Mary Peters Fieser
- Awards: George C. Pimentel (1967); William H. Nichols Medal (1963)
- Scientific career
- Fields: Chemistry
- Workplaces: University of Oxford; Harvard University
- Thesis: Reduction potentials of quinones. / A new absorbent for oxygen in gas analysis (1924)
- Doctoral advisor: James Bryant Conant
- Doctoral students: Donald J. Cram; William Summer Johnson; Alfred Bader
- Other notable students: Donald J. Cram
- Military career
- Branch: Office of Strategic Services; National Defense Research Committee
- Units: Research and Development Branch; Office of Scientific Research and Development
- Commands: Chief of the Incendiary Devices Section
- Conflicts: World War II

Louis Frederick Fieser (April 7, 1899 – July 25, 1977) was an American organic chemist, professor, and in 1968, professor emeritus at Harvard University. His award-winning research included work on blood-clotting agents including the first synthesis of vitamin K, synthesis and screening of quinones as antimalarial drugs, work with steroids leading to the synthesis of cortisone, and study of the nature of polycyclic aromatic hydrocarbons. He also invented militarily effective napalm while at Harvard in 1942.

== Overview ==
Fieser was born in Columbus, Ohio, obtained his BA in chemistry in 1920 from Williams College, and his PhD under James Bryant Conant at Harvard in 1924. His graduate research concerned the measurement of oxidation potentials in quinone oxidation. in 1924-1925 Fieser worked at the University of Oxford with W.H. Perkin Jr. and with Julius von Braun at the Frankfurt University as a postdoc. Between 1925 and 1930 he worked at Bryn Mawr College where he met his future wife. He then moved to Harvard University.

With his research assistant and wife Mary Peters Fieser (MA, 1936, Radcliffe) he coauthored eight books and the first seven volumes of the classic series Reagents for Organic Synthesis known popularly among chemists as "Fieser and Fieser". He was also an editor and contributor for Organic Syntheses.

At Harvard University, Fieser was a well-loved faculty member widely known for using inventive methods to educate his students, such as demonstrating "How NOT to Perform a Recrystallization" (in which he allowed a flask of charcoal to overflow and create a mess of his desk and himself). Fieser even produced a $28,000 educational film to supplement his organic chemistry lecture. As part of a scene in which Fieser demonstrated how cholesterol could be experimentally isolated from gall stones, the film featured a shot of a collection of oversized and rare gall stones from Boston-area hospitals. Notably, Fieser's students appreciated his efforts so much that they sold orange "Louie" sweatshirts branded with Fieser's face in Harvard Square, one of which was worn by Fieser himself to lecture one day.

Fieser had two chemical reagents named for him. Fieser's reagent is a mixture of chromium trioxide in acetic acid. Fieser's solution is an aqueous solution of potassium hydroxide, sodium hydrosulfite, and sodium anthraquinone β-sulfonate used for the removal of oxygen from a gas stream. Woodward's rules for calculating UV absorption maxima are also known as the Woodward-Fieser rules. He was the first to propose the existence of iceane.

In 1939 Fieser was involved in a competitive race for the structure elucidation of Vitamin K and he was able to report its synthesis in the end of that year. According to a recent in memoriam Fieser was a contender for the Nobel Prize in Physiology or Medicine in 1941 and 1942 (when no prizes were actually awarded). However the 1943 award was shared between Henrik Dam for the discovery of vitamin K and Edward A. Doisy for the discovery of its chemical nature.

Fieser was elected to the American Academy of Arts and Sciences in 1933, the United States National Academy of Sciences in 1940, and the American Philosophical Society in 1941.

During World War II Fieser was partly responsible for a military experiment that went disastrously awry. Project X-ray was a scheme to drop a great number of bats with small incendiary charges with a timed fuse attached over Japan to start widespread fires. After the bats nested in housing and factories, the timed fuses would ignite the incendiary charges (napalm) and start the fires. During a test run, a number of the bats escaped and ignited Carlsbad Airfield's hangars, barracks, and a general's car. "The accidental incineration of Carlsbad Auxiliary Army Airfield by incendiary bats was both a high and a low for Project X-Ray." Fieser omitted the account of the fires from his own account of the bat tests.

Dow Chemical began producing his formula for napalm during World War II. The use of napalm during the Vietnam War stirred controversy. Fieser, however, was unapologetic for its creation. He stated, "I have no right to judge the morality of napalm just because I invented it."

In 1962 he served on the U.S. Surgeon General's Advisory Committee that in 1964 issued a report on the relationship between smoking and health. Fieser was a chain smoker, and only after he was diagnosed with lung cancer in 1965 and recovered did he quit the habit and start to actively promote the committee's conclusions.

Fieser was the graduate advisor of 1987 Nobel laureate Donald J. Cram.
