= Mary Peters Fieser =

American chemist

- Born: May 27, 1909; Atchison, Kansas, US
- Died: March 22, 1997 (aged 87); Belmont, Massachusetts, US
- Education: Bryn Mawr College, US; Radcliffe College, US
- Known for: synthesizing vitamin K; writing organic chemistry textbooks
- Spouse: Louis Fieser (1932–1977)
- Awards: Garvan–Olin Medal (1971)

Mary Peters Fieser (May 27, 1909 – March 22, 1997) was an American chemist best known for the many books she wrote with her husband Louis Fieser.

== Biography ==
She was born Mary Peters in 1909 in Atchison, Kansas. Her father, Robert Peters, was a college professor of English: the family later moved to Harrisburg, Pennsylvania, when he accepted a position at the Carnegie Institute of Technology (now Carnegie Mellon University). Mary and her sister Ruth were educated in a private girls’ high school, and both went on to study at Bryn Mawr College. Mary graduated from Bryn Mawr in 1930 with a B.A. in chemistry.

It was at Bryn Mawr that Mary Peters met her future husband, a professor of chemistry who became her mentor. When Louis Fieser left Bryn Mawr in 1930 to join the faculty at Harvard University, Mary Peters decided to follow him and pursue an advanced degree in chemistry. She had to officially enroll at nearby Radcliffe College in order to take chemistry courses at Harvard and could not escape the gender discrimination of her era. One professor of analytical chemistry in particular, Gregory Baxter, would not allow her in the laboratory with the male students: rather, she had to carry out her experiments (without supervision) in the deserted basement of a nearby building. She was awarded a Radcliffe M.A. in chemistry in 1936, but decided not to pursue a Ph.D.: "I could see I was not going to get along well on my own, [but as Mrs. Fieser] I could do as much chemistry as I wanted."

Mary Peters married her mentor in 1932, and their scientific collaboration continued until Louis Fieser's death in 1977. Their early research together focused on the chemistry of quinones and steroids, and they developed syntheses of Vitamin K, cortisone, and the antimalarial compound lapinone. However the Fiesers were best known for their numerous books. Their first joint textbook, Organic Chemistry (1944), became very successful and influential on both sides of the Atlantic because of the originality in the presentation of the material, and went through many editions. In 1967 the Fiesers began to publish Reagents for Organic Synthesis and produced six volumes before Louis Fieser's death: Mary continued the project with collaborators. They also published a Style Guide for Chemists in 1959, as well as a seminal monograph on Steroids the same year.

Fieser never had a paid position at Harvard, although she received the title of Research Fellow of Chemistry about twenty-nine years after she began work there. She was awarded the Garvan Medal of the American Chemical Society in 1971, and the Louis and Mary Fieser Laboratory for Undergraduate Organic Chemistry at Harvard University is named after her and her husband. In 2008, Harvard's Department of Chemistry and Chemical Biology created Mary Fieser Postdoctoral Fellowship to support women and underrepresented minorities in chemistry.

Mary Fieser died on March 22, 1997, in Belmont, Massachusetts. She never had children, but was always surrounded by cats, illustrations of which found their way into the prefaces of many of her books.
