= Polydioctylfluorene =

Names
- Other names Poly(9,9'-dioctylfluorene); PFO; PDF

Identifiers
CAS Number	123864-00-6
ChemSpider	none

Properties
Chemical formula	(C_{29}H_{42})_{n}
Molar mass	Variable
- Except where otherwise noted, data are given for materials in their standard state (at 25 °C [77 °F], 100 kPa). verify (what is ?) Infobox references

Polydioctylfluorene (PFO) is an organic compound, a polymer of 9,9-dioctylfluorene, with formula (C_{13}H_{6}(C_{8}H_{17})_{2})_{n}. It is an electroluminescent conductive polymer that characteristically emits blue light. Like other polyfluorene polymers, it has been studied as a possible material for light-emitting diodes.

== Structure ==
The monomer has an aromatic fluorene core -C_{13}H_{6}- with two aliphatic n-octyl -C_{8}H_{17} tails attached to the central carbon. Polydioctylfluorene (PFO) can be found in liquid-crystalline, glassy, amorphous, semi-crystalline or β-chain formation. This variety is on account of the intermolecular forces that PFO can participate in. The secondary forces present in PFO are typically van der Waals, which are relatively weak. These weak forces makes it a solid that can also be used as a film on a substrate. The glassy films formed by PFO chains form solutions in good solvents, meaning it is at least partially soluble. These van der Waals also add complexity to the microstructure of PFO, which is why it has a wide range of solid formations. The solid formations though, typically form low density due to the low cooling rate of the polymer. The density of polydioctylfluorene is measured by using the process of ultraviolet photoelectron spectroscopy. Chain stiffness is also prominent in PFO, because of this it is predicted that the molecular weight is a factor of 2.7 lower than polystyrene, which can produce an approximation of 190 repeat units in a standard PFO chain. By changing the strain and temperature applied to the polymer's structure results in an alteration of the PFO's properties. Thermal treatment such as friction transfer can be applied to the structure, this is a way to alter the properties. The friction transfer aligns the structure to become crystalline or liquid crystalline. Polymer 196 is the most commonly studied type of polydioctylfluorene. In studies, polymer 196 has shown the most promising properties and the best crystallinity. Within the crystal structure of polymer 196 octyl side chains are inserted between the layer of the polymer to provide more space for efficiency in structuring the material.

In studies, the structure of polydioctylfluorene was observed by using grazing-incidence X-ray diffraction after applying friction to the structure. Experiments revealed PFO was present in crystalline films and liquid crystalline after cooling and use of friction. As a result of the friction exerted, twofold symmetry in PFO was broken. The friction transfer used to obtain a single crystal film is important in the process of fabricating polarized light emitting diodes.

== Properties ==
Polydioctylfluorene, can also be known as polymer 196 to polyfluorene. The molar mass of PFO ranges between 24,000–41,600 (g/mol) and because of this varying molar mass, many other properties vary as well. For example, the glass transition temperature can fall somewhere between 72–113 degrees Celsius. The absolute wavelength emitted by PFO can range between 386–389 nm in a solution of CHCl_{3}, and falls around 389 in a solution of THF. The absolute film wavelength of PFO though falls between 380–394 nm. The melting point of a crystalline molecule of PFO is predicted to be about 150 degrees Celsius.

There have also been reports that some of the solid states of polydioctylfluorene are composted in sheet-like layers which are about 50–100 nm thick. As a result of these sheets, the glassy and semicrystalline states can be formed (excluding amorphous, liquid crystalline, and beta chain states). When cooled quickly, the chains tightly align, giving PFO a close packing factor, though because of the high complexity of the chains, this sometimes gets messy and creates the amorphous state. The parts of the molecule that add this complexity are the carbon rings (that are located in the backbone) making the molecule overall large in size.

== Applications ==
The formation of beta-phase chains in PFO can be formed through dip-pen nanolithography, to represent wavelength changes in metamaterials. The dip-pen technique allows a scale of 500 nm > to be visible. The beta chains can be converted into the glassy films by adding extra stress to the main fluorine backbone unit, whether beta chains are formed is determined by peaks in wavelength absorption. Beta chains can also be confirmed to be present by using solvent to non-solvent mixtures. If the molecule were to be dipped into this mixture for ten seconds, the chains with no dissolution of films are able to produce these said beta chains.

Polydioctylfluorene is a polymer light-emitting device known as PLED, which covalently bonds to the carbon hydrogen chains. PFO is a copolymer of basic polyfluorene, which enables it to release phosphorescent light. This basic fluorene backbone strengthens the molecule on account of the carbon rings. The cross-linking in polydioctylfluorene structure provides an efficient technique for hole-transport layers to emit light. Also, when a solvent-polymer compound is added the β-phase crystalline structure to be maintained. Efficiency in current can reach a maximum of about 17 cd/A and maximum luminance obtained can be approximately 14,000 cd/m(2). The hole-transport layers (HTLs) improve the polymer's anode hole injection and greatly increase electron blocking. By having the capability to control the microstructure of phase domains gives an opportunity to optimize the optoelectronic properties of PFO based products. When needs for optoelectronic emittance are reached in polydioctylfluorene, the electroluminescence given off in dependent on the active layer in the conjugate polymer. Another way to affect the optoelectronic properties is by altering how dense the phase chain segments are ordered. Low densities can be achieved from tremendously slow crystallization while on the other hand directional crystalline solution can be achieved by use of thermal gradients.
