= Donald J. Cram =

American chemist (1919–2001)

Donald James Cram
- Born: April 22, 1919; Chester, Vermont
- Died: June 17, 2001 (aged 82); Palm Desert, California
- Education: Rollins College (BS); University of Nebraska (MS); Harvard University (PhD)
- Known for: Cram's rule Host–guest chemistry phenonium ions paracyclophanes
- Awards: Nobel Prize in Chemistry (1987); Glenn T. Seaborg Medal (1989); National Medal of Science (1993); Guggenheim fellowship (1955)
- Scientific career
- Fields: Chemistry
- Workplaces: UCLA, Merck & Co, MIT
- Theses: Amino ketones, mechanism studies of the reactions of heterocyclic secondary amines with -bromo-, -unsaturated ketones. (1942); Syntheses and reactions of 2-(ketoalkyl)-3-hydroxy-1, 4-naphthoquinones (1947)
- Doctoral advisor: Louis Fieser
- Doctoral students: M. Frederick Hawthorne; Norman L. Allinger

Donald James Cram (April 22, 1919 – June 17, 2001) was an American chemist who shared the 1987 Nobel Prize in Chemistry with Jean-Marie Lehn and Charles J. Pedersen "for their development and use of molecules with structure-specific interactions of high selectivity." They were the founders of the field of host–guest chemistry.

== Early life and education ==
Cram was born and raised in Chester, Vermont, to a Scottish immigrant father, and a German immigrant mother. His father died before Cram turned four, leaving him the only male in a family of five. He grew up on Aid to Dependent Children, and learned to work at an early age, doing jobs such as picking fruit, tossing newspapers, and painting houses, while bartering for piano lessons. By the time he turned eighteen, he had worked at least eighteen different jobs.

Cram attended the Winwood High School in Long Island, N.Y. From 1938 to 1941, he attended Rollins College in Winter Park, Florida on a national honorary scholarship, where he worked as an assistant in the chemistry department, and was active in theater, chapel choir, Lambda Chi Alpha, Phi Society, and Zeta Alpha Epsilon. It was at Rollins that he became known for building his own chemistry equipment. In 1941, he graduated from Rollins College with a BS in chemistry.

In 1942, he graduated from the University of Nebraska with a MS in organic chemistry, with Norman O. Cromwell serving as his thesis adviser. His subject was "Amino ketones, mechanism studies of the reactions of heterocyclic secondary amines with -bromo-, -unsaturated ketones."

In 1947, Cram graduated from Harvard University with a PhD in organic chemistry, with Louis Fieser serving as the adviser on his dissertation on "Syntheses and reactions of 2-(ketoalkyl)-3-hydroxy-1,4-naphthoquinones"

== Career ==
From 1942 to 1945, Cram worked in chemical research at Merck & Co laboratories, doing penicillin research with mentor Max Tishler. Postdoctoral work was as an American Chemical Society postdoctoral fellow at the Massachusetts Institute of Technology, with John D. Roberts. Cram was the originator of Cram's rule, which provides a model for predicting the outcome of nucleophilic attack of carbonyl compounds. He published over 350 research papers and eight books on organic chemistry, and taught graduate and post-doctoral students from 21 different countries.

=== Research ===
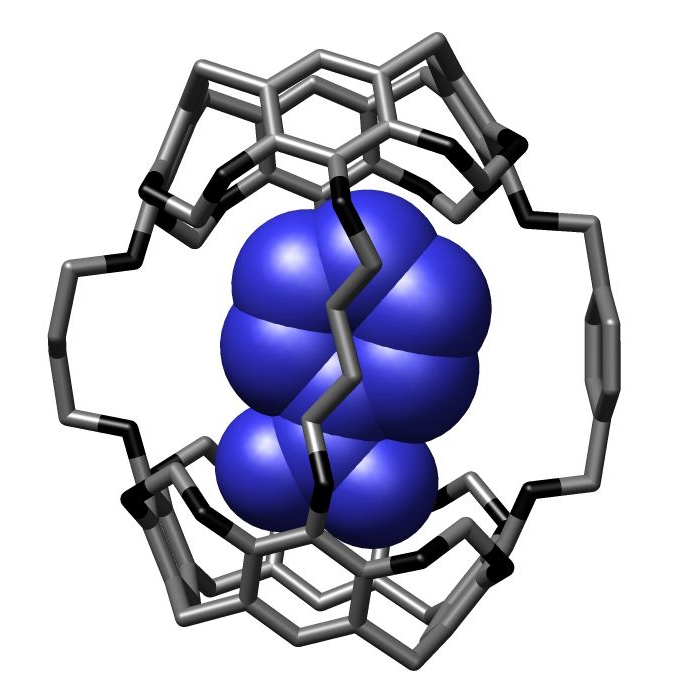
Crystal structure of a nitrobenzene bound within a hemicarcerand reported by Cram and coworkers

Cram expanded upon Charles Pedersen's ground-breaking synthesis of crown ethers, two-dimensional organic compounds that are able to recognize and selectively combine with the ions of certain metal elements. He synthesized molecules that took this chemistry into three dimensions, creating an array of differently shaped molecules that could interact selectively with other chemicals because of their complementary three-dimensional structures. Cram's work represented a large step toward the synthesis of functional laboratory-made mimics of enzymes and other natural molecules whose special chemical behavior is due to their characteristic structure. He also did work in stereochemistry and Cram's rule of asymmetric induction is named after him.

In 1973, Cram collaborated on research with Irish chemist Francis Leslie Scott.

=== Professor ===
Cram was named an assistant professor at the University of California, Los Angeles in 1947, and a professor in 1955. He served there until his retirement in 1987. He was a popular teacher, having instructed some 8,000 undergraduates in his career and guided the academic output of 200 graduate students. He entertained his classes by strumming his guitar and singing folk songs. He showed a self-deprecating style, saying at one time:

An investigator starts research in a new field with faith, a foggy idea, and a few wild experiments. Eventually the interplay of negative and positive results guides the work. By the time the research is completed, he or she knows how it should have been started and conducted.

=== Bibliography ===
Technical Reports:

- "Multiheteromacrocycles that Complex Metal Ions. Second Progress Report, 1 May 1975 – 30 April 1976", UCLA, United States Department of Energy (through predecessor agency the U.S. Energy Research and Development Administration), (January 15, 1976).
- "Multiheteromacrocycles that Complex Metal Ions. Fourth Progress Report, 1 May 1977 – 30 April 1978", UCLA, United States Department of Energy (through predecessor agency the U.S. Energy Research and Development Administration), (January 15, 1978).
- "Multiheteromacrocycles that Complex Metal Ions. Sixth Progress Report, 1 May 1979-30 April 1980", UCLA, United States Department of Energy, (January 15, 1980).
- "Multiheteromacrocycles that Complex Metal Ions. Ninth Progress Report (includes results of last three years), 1 May 1980 – 30 April 1983", UCLA, United States Department of Energy, (September 15, 1982).

Books:

1. Cram, Donald J.; Jane M. Cram (1994). Container Molecules and their Guests. Great Britain: Royal Society of Chemistry. pp. 223 pp. ISBN 978-0-85404-507-5.
2. Cram, Donald J. (1990). From Design to Discovery. Washington, DC: American Chemical Society. pp. 146pp.
3. Cram, Jane M.; Donald J. Cram (1978). The Essence of Organic Chemistry. Reading, Massachusetts: Addison-Wesley. pp. 456pp.
4. Hendrickson, James B.; Donald J. Cram; George S. Hammond (1970). Organic Chemistry. Reading, Massachusetts: McGraw-Hill. pp. 1279pp. 3rd ed.
5. Richards, John; Don Cram; George S. Hammond (1967). Elements of organic chemistry. New York: McGraw-Hill. pp. 444pp. LCCN 66024479.
6. Cram, Donald J. (1965). Fundamentals of Carbanion Chemistry. New York: Academic Press. pp. 289pp.
7. Cram, Donald J.; George S. Hammond (1964). Organic Chemistry. New York: McGraw-Hill. pp. 846pp. 2nd ed.
8. Cram, Donald J.; George S. Hammond (1959). Organic Chemistry. New York: McGraw-Hill. pp. 712pp. 1st ed.

=== Awards and honors ===
- NAS Award in Chemical Sciences
- Saul Winstein Endowed Chair in Organic Chemistry
- National Medal of Science, 1993
- International Academy of Science, Munich, member
- Glenn T. Seaborg Medal, 1989
- Golden Plate Award of the American Academy of Achievement, 1988
- ACS Southern California Tolman Award, 1984
- ACS Chicago Section Willard Gibbs Award, 1985
- ACS Cope Award for Distinguished Achievement in Organic Chemistry, 1974
- American Academy of Arts and Sciences, member, 1967
- American Chemical Society Award for Creative Work in Synthetic Organic Chemistry, 1965
- National Academy of Sciences, member, 1961
- 1987 Nobel Prize in Chemistry

== Personal life ==
Cram once admitted that his career wasn't without sacrifice. His first wife was Rollins classmate, Jean Turner, who also graduated in 1941, and went on to receive a master's degree in social work from Columbia University. His second wife, Jane, is a former chemistry professor at Mount Holyoke College. Cram chose not to have any children, "because I would either be a bad father or a bad scientist."

Cram died of cancer in 2001, at the age of 82.
