= Carcerand =

Molecule which completely entraps another within itself

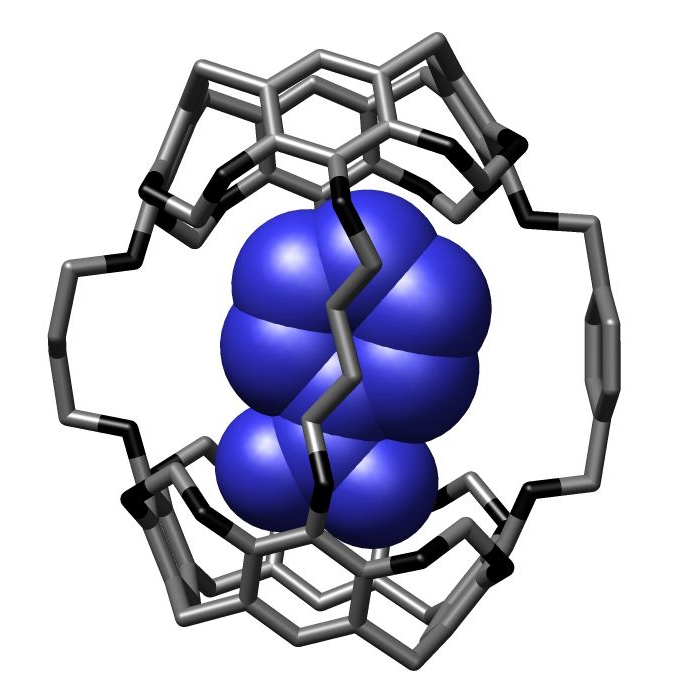
Crystal structure of a nitrobenzene bound within a hemicarcerand reported by Cram and coworkers in Chem. Commun., 1997, 1303-1304.

In host–guest chemistry, a carcerand (from Latin carcer 'prison') is a host molecule that completely entraps its guest (which can be an ion, atom or other chemical species) so that it will not escape even at high temperatures. This type of molecule was first described in 1985 by Donald J. Cram and coworkers. The complexes formed by a carcerand with permanently imprisoned guests are called carceplexes.

In contrast, hemicarcerands allow guests to enter and exit the cavity at high temperatures but will form stable complexes at ambient temperatures. The complexes formed by a hemicarcerand and a guest are called hemicarceplexes.

== Reactivity of bound guests ==
Cram described the interior of the container compound as the inner phase in which radically different reactivity was observed. He used a hemicarcerand to isolate highly unstable, antiaromatic cyclobutadiene at room temperature. The hemicarcerand stabilizes guests within its cavity by preventing their reaction with other molecules.

== Synthesis ==
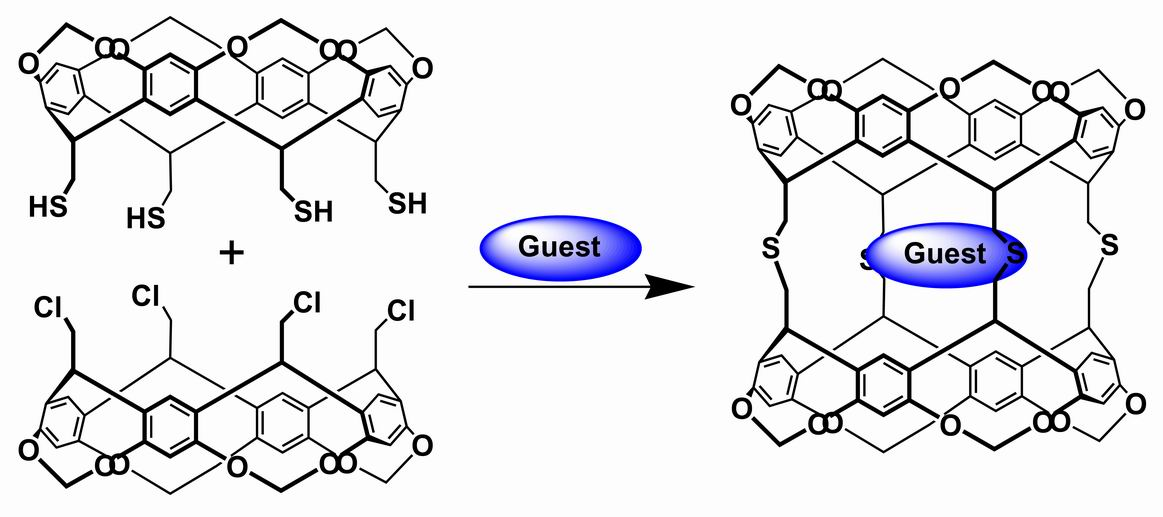
Synthesis of a carcerand from two calixarenes.

The first generation carcerands are based on calixarene hemicarcerands with 4 alkyl substituents on the upper rim and 4 reactive substituents on the lower rim. The coupling of both hemicarcerands takes place through a spacer group. In the original 1985 publication two different hemicarcerands react, one with chloromethylene reactive groups and one with thiomethylene reactive groups in a nucleophilic displacement and the resulting spacer group is a dimethylsulfide (CH_{2}SCH_{2}). In this experiment the guests were the molecules already present in the reaction medium such as argon and dimethylformamide.

In another configuration the 4 lower rim functional groups are aldehydes which condense with O-Phenylenediamine to the corresponding di-imines. The 4 spacer groups connecting the two spheres are now much longer and consequently the internal cavity is much larger. Compounds trapped in the cavity are said to be held there by constrictive binding. They can be introduced by simply heating in neat solvent like hexachlorobutadiene (a fungicide). The half-life of the reverse process is 3.2 hours at 25 °C in CDCl_{3} by NMR analysis. Ferrocene can be introduced by heating with the hemicarcerand in a large bulky solvent such as tripiperidylphosphine oxide. The half-life for ferrocene liberation is 19.6 hours at 112 °C.

== Large carcerands ==
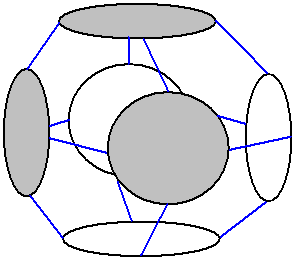
Octahedral Nanocontainer

The internal cavity of a carcerand can be as large as 1700 Å^{3} (1.7 nm^{3}) when six hemicarcerands form a single octahedral compound. This is accomplished by dynamic covalent chemistry in a one-pot condensation of 6 equivalents of a tetraformyl calixarene and 12 equivalents of ethylene diamine with trifluoroacetic acid catalyst in chloroform at room temperature followed by reduction of the imine bonds with sodium borohydride.
