= Poly(p-phenylene) =

Polymer

The structure of the repeating unit of PPP

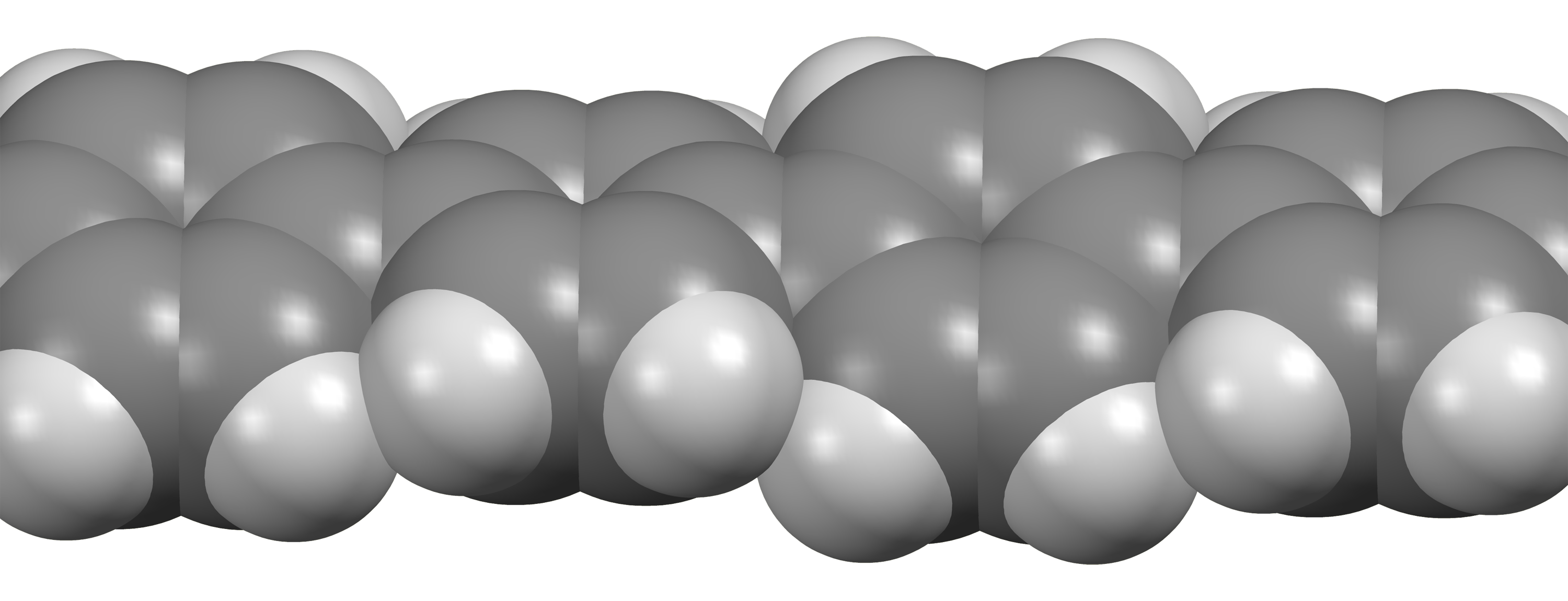
Space-filling model of a short section of PPP

Poly(p-phenylene) (PPP) is made of repeating p-phenylene units, which act as the precursor to a conducting polymer of the rigid-rod polymer family. The synthesis of PPP has proven challenging, but has been accomplished through excess polycondensation with the Suzuki coupling method.

Early efforts typically produced black, insoluble powders that were difficult to characterize. For example, a 1960 paper reports "The solid glowed red-hot in a Bunsen flame, with no evidence of flame formation, and disappeared only slowly." Initially, the chemical and thermal stability of the material drove interest in its synthesis. It was used in rocket nozzles and some fabrics requiring high thermal stability.

Oxidation or the use of dopants is used to convert the non-conductive form to a semiconductor.

== See also ==
- List of conjugated polymers
- Cycloparaphenylene - rings of p-phenylene units
