= Francis Leslie Scott =

Irish chemist (1928–2008)

Professor Francis Leslie Scott MRIA
- Born: 3 July 1928; Cork, Ireland
- Died: 14 January 2008 (aged 79)
- Spouse: Dr Margaret Kennedy
- Awards: Higher doctorate, NUI travelling studentship

Academic background
- Education: University College Cork (1945–1952); National University of Ireland

Academic work
- Institutions: University College Cork; University of California
- Main interests: Organic chemistry, rocket chemistry, Mathematics

Francis Leslie Scott MRIA (3 July 1928 – 14 January 2008) was an Irish chemist in the field of organic chemistry, though he contributed equally to the wider scientific world.

Scott began his career at University College Cork, where he published twenty-eight internationally refereed papers on organonitrogen chemistry, including several in the prestigious international journals Nature, the Journal of the American Chemical Society, The Journal of Organic Chemistry and Angewandte Chemie. He published over 100 papers during his period as professor of chemistry at UCC.

Many of Scott's students were critical to staffing Ireland's Regional Technical Colleges. Only ten percent left Ireland on a permanent basis, following Scott's hope of attracting top students and training them in the initial stage to keep them highly motivated.

== Education ==
From 1945, Scott attended University College Cork first as an undergraduate, having gained first place in Ireland in both mathematics and chemistry. He completed an MSc in chemistry in 1948, graduating top of his class; in 1952, he completed a PhD on oxyiminotriazines with Professor Joseph Reilly. From 1949 to 1953 and alongside Joseph Reilly, Scott co-supervised twenty-five MSc and PhD students, including physicist Margaret Kennedy, whom he subsequently married.

Scott obtained a university entrance scholarship to National University of Ireland (NUI).

== Career ==
In 1953, Scott moved to the University of California (UCLA) in Los Angeles, where he continued research with the Canadian chemist Saul Winstein. In 1954, he began working for the Pennwalt Corporation in its research division, where he examined rocket propellants and organic polymers, finishing after 6 six years in 1960; his work was highly secretive. In 1955 he was appointed a lecturer in organic chemistry at UCLA, though he continued his independent research throughout. In 1958 at the age of 30, he earned a higher doctorate (D.Sc.), the youngest NUI graduate ever to do so.

In 1960, Scott succeeded Joseph Reilly as professor of chemistry at UCC. His professorship led to significant expansion in student numbers and research publications. His research was focused mostly on the fundamental mechanisms of chemical processes, including the study of high nitrogen compounds, Heterocyclic compounds and organophosphorus species. His publications covered many areas including neighbouring group effects, reactive intermediates, sulfamic acids and halogenation. In 1963 he was elected a member of the Royal Irish Academy.

Scott was active in the UCC Graduates Association. Following a campaign on his behalf, he became a member of University College Cork's governing board from 1967 to 1973. During this time, he helped to fund many key physical developments. Scott was pivotal in the appointment of professors Joe Cunningham (of physical chemistry) and Brian Hathaway (of inorganic chemistry). He taught not only in his own field of organic chemistry, but also in the wider scientific world.

In the Cork area, Scott ran a series of major international conferences. The first, sponsored by The Royal Society of Chemistry in July 1964, was on organic reaction mechanisms; it attracted over 600 international devotees of industry and academia. Later conferences held were on inorganic reaction mechanism, nitrogen chemistry and sulfur chemistry. This series of conferences ensured international attention for UCC chemistry.

After the death of his wife in 1973, Scott returned to University College Cork to work with Donald J. Cram, who was later awarded the Nobel Prize in Chemistry.
