= Polyisothianaphthene =

Polyisothianaphthene (PITN) is a conducting polymer that exhibits better conductivity than its relative, polythiophene.
