= Cyclobutadiene =

Cyclobutadiene
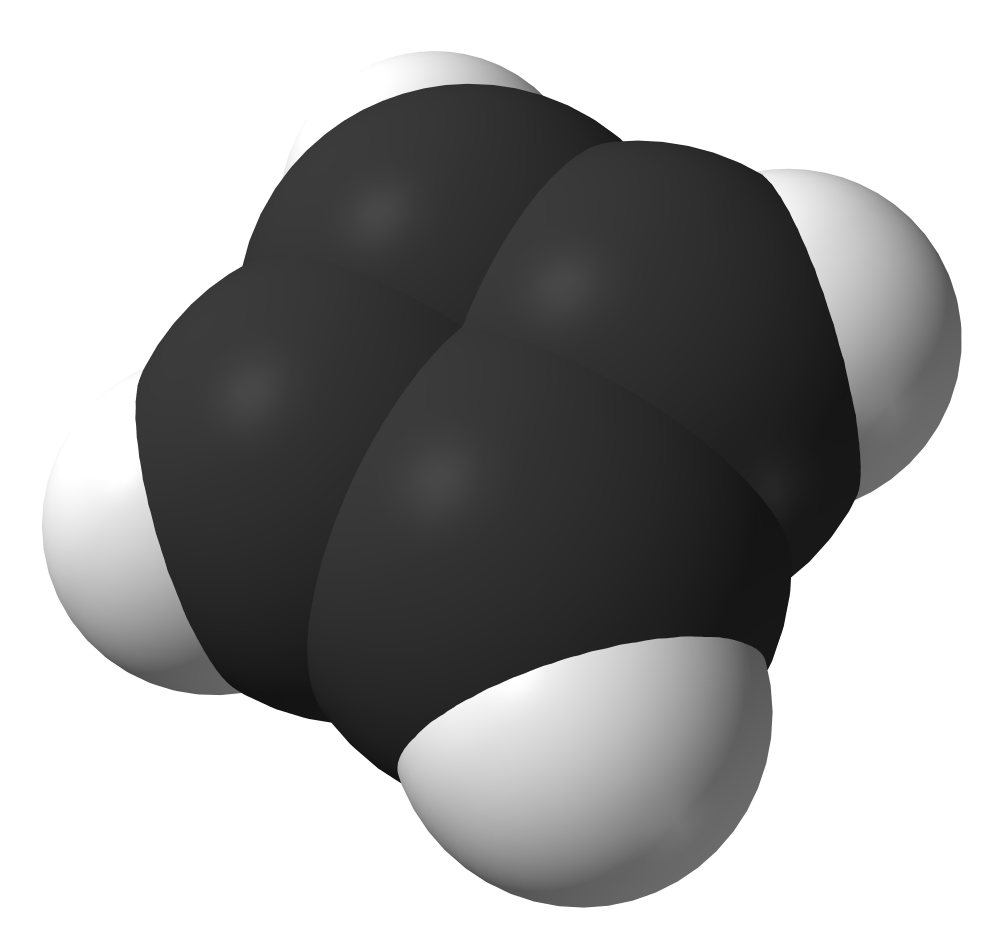
Space-filling model.

Names
- Preferred IUPAC name Cyclobuta-1,3-diene
- Other names 1,3-Cyclobutadiene; Cyclobutadiene [4]Annulene

Identifiers
CAS Number	1120-53-2
3D model (JSmol)	Interactive image
ChEBI	CHEBI:33657
ChemSpider	120626
PubChem CID	136879
UNII	I5G5583N4F
CompTox Dashboard (EPA)	DTXSID00149807
- InChI: InChI=1S/C4H4/c1-2-4-3-1/h1-4H Key: HWEQKSVYKBUIIK-UHFFFAOYSA-N; InChI=1/C4H4/c1-2-4-3-1/h1-4H Key: HWEQKSVYKBUIIK-UHFFFAOYAI
- SMILES: C1=CC=C1

Properties
Chemical formula	C_{4}H_{4}
Molar mass	52.076 g·mol^{−1}
- Except where otherwise noted, data are given for materials in their standard state (at 25 °C [77 °F], 100 kPa). verify (what is ?) Infobox references

Cyclobutadiene is an organic compound with the formula C_{4}H_{4}. It is very reactive owing to its tendency to dimerize. Although the parent compound has not been isolated, some substituted derivatives are robust, and a single molecule of cyclobutadiene is quite stable. Since the compound degrades by a bimolecular process, the species can be observed by matrix isolation techniques at temperatures below 35 K. It is thought to adopt a rectangular structure.

== Structure and reactivity ==
The compound is the prototypical antiaromatic hydrocarbon with 4 π electrons. It is the smallest [n]-annulene ([4]-annulene). Its rectangular structure is the result of a pseudo- (or second-order) Jahn–Teller effect, which distorts the molecule and lowers its symmetry, converting the triplet to a singlet ground state. The electronic states of cyclobutadiene have been explored with a variety of computational methods. The rectangular structure is consistent with the existence of two different 1,2-dideutero-1,3-cyclobutadiene valence isomers. This distortion indicates that the π electrons are localized, in agreement with Hückel's rule which predicts that a π-system of 4 electrons is not aromatic.

In principle, another situation is possible. Namely, cyclobutadiene could assume an undistorted square geometry, if it adopts a triplet spin state. In this case the molecule will be aromatic in agreement with Baird's rule. While a theoretical possibility, the triplet form of the parent cyclobutadiene and its substituted derivatives remained elusive for decades. However, in 2017, the square triplet excited state of 1,2,3,4-tetrakis(trimethylsilyl)-1,3-cyclobutadiene was observed spectroscopically, and a singlet-triplet gap of E_{ST} = 13.9 kcal/mol (or 0.6 eV per molecule) was measured for this compound.

== Synthesis ==
Several cyclobutadiene derivatives have been isolated with steric bulky substituents. Orange tetrakis(tert-butyl)cyclobutadiene arises by thermolysis of its isomer tetra-tert-butyltetrahedrane. Although the cyclobutadiene derivative is stable (with respect to dimerization), it decomposes upon contact with O_{2}.

Cyclobutadiene was also synthesized in low-temperature solid acetylene upon irradiation with high-energy electrons.

== Trapping ==
Samples of cyclobutadiene are unstable since the compound dimerizes at temperatures above 35 K by a Diels-Alder reaction. By suppressing bimolecular decomposition pathways, cyclobutadiene is well-behaved. Thus it has been generated in a hemicarceplex. The inclusion compound is generated by photodecarboxylation of bicyclopyran-2-one. When released from the host–guest complex, cyclobutadiene dimerizes and then converts to cyclooctatetraene.

After numerous attempts, cyclobutadiene was first generated by oxidative degradation of cyclobutadieneiron tricarbonyl with ammonium cerium(IV) nitrate. When liberated from the iron complex, cyclobutadiene reacts with electron-deficient alkynes to form a Dewar benzene:

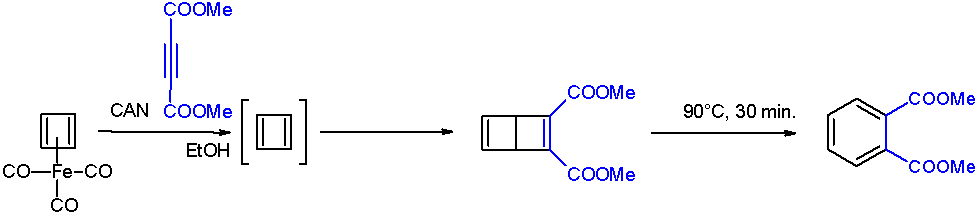

The Dewar benzene converts to dimethyl phthalate on heating at 90 °C.

One cyclobutadiene derivative is also accessible through a [2+2]cycloaddition of a di-alkyne. In this particular reaction, the trapping reagent is 2,3,4,5-tetraphenylcyclopenta-2,4-dienone, and one of the final products (after expulsion of carbon monoxide) is a cyclooctatetraene:

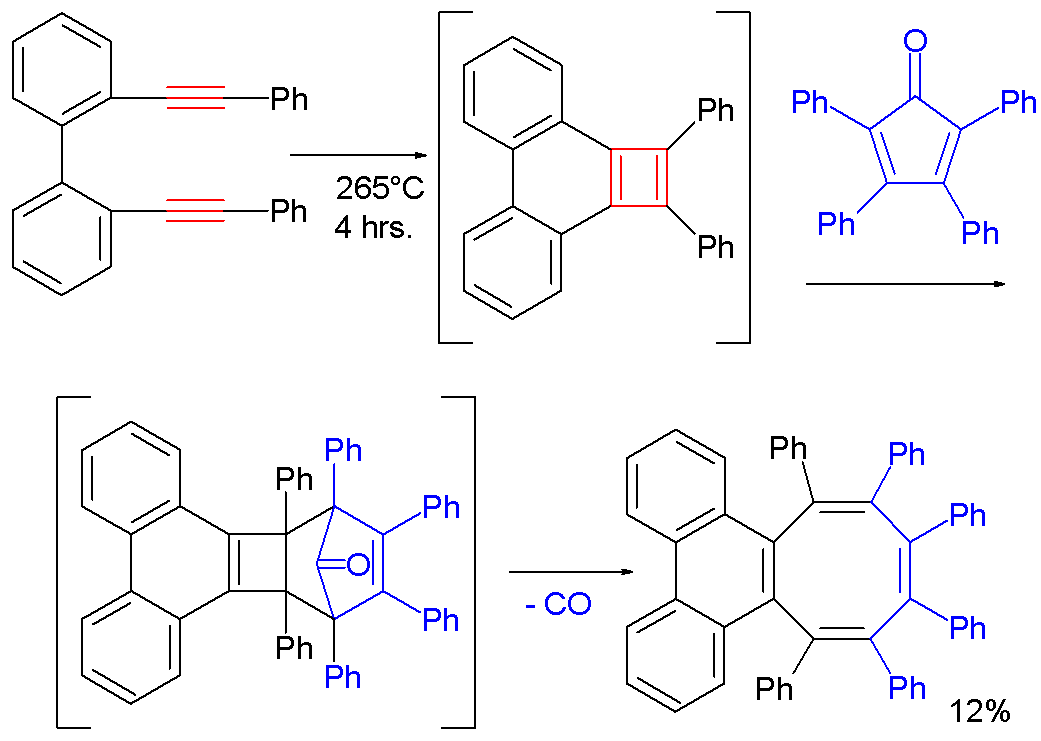

== See also ==
- Butadiene
- Cyclobutene
- Squaric acid
