= Chromophore =

Part of a molecule responsible for its color

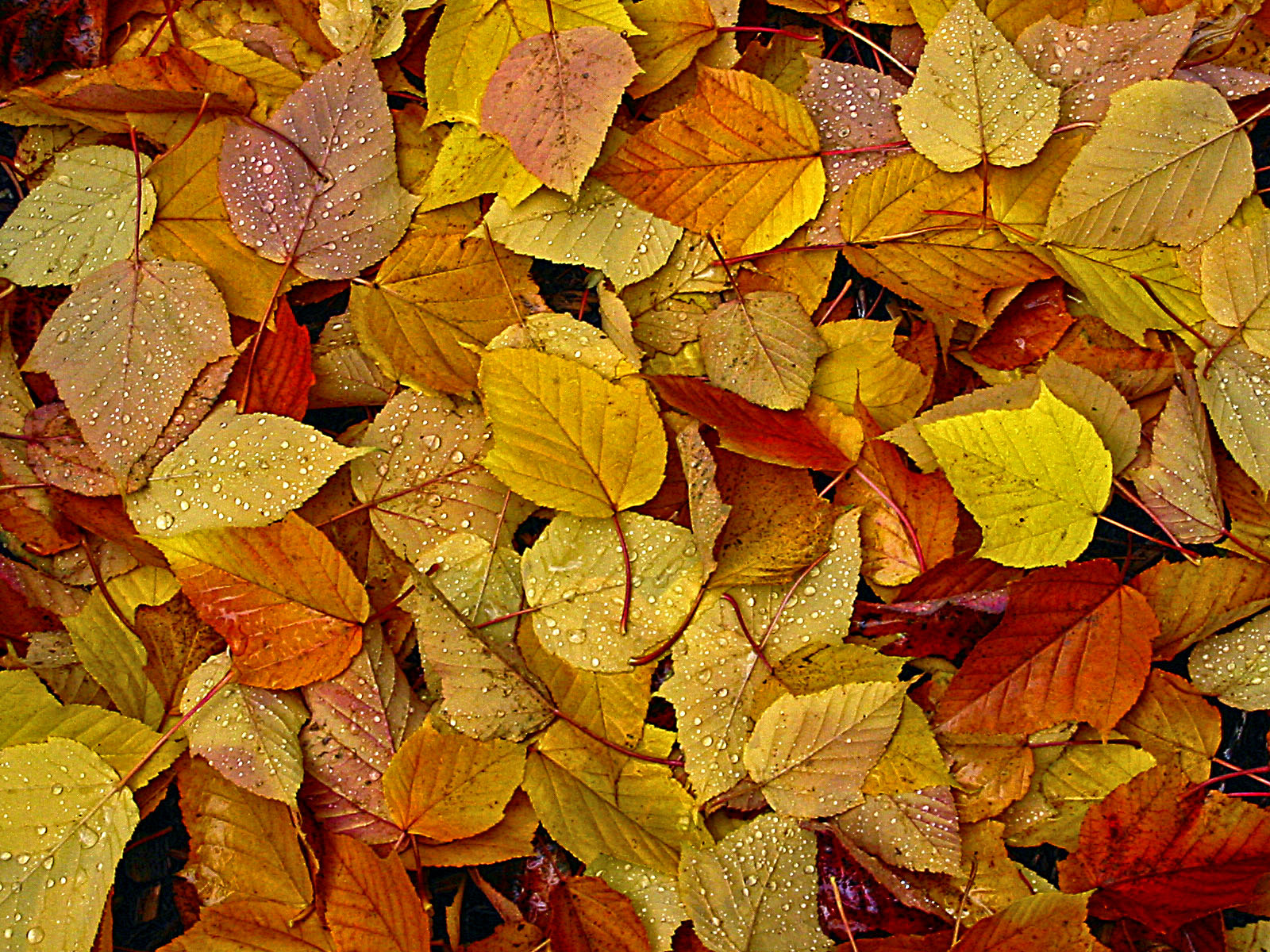
Leaves change color in the fall because their chromophores (chlorophyll molecules) break down and stop absorbing red and blue light.

A chromophore is the part of a molecule responsible for its color. The word is derived from Ancient Greek χρῶμᾰ (chroma) 'color' and -φόρος (phoros) 'carrier of'. The color that is seen by our eyes is that of the light not absorbed by the reflecting object within a certain wavelength spectrum of visible light. The chromophore is a region in the molecule where the energy difference between two separate molecular orbitals falls within the range of the visible spectrum (or in informal contexts, the spectrum under scrutiny). Visible light that hits the chromophore can thus be absorbed by exciting an electron from its ground state into an excited state. In biological molecules that serve to capture or detect light energy, the chromophore is the moiety that causes a conformational change in the molecule when hit by light.

Healthy plants are perceived as green because chlorophyll absorbs mainly the blue and red wavelengths but green light, reflected by plant structures like cell walls, is less absorbed.

The eleven conjugated double bonds that form the chromophore of the β-carotene molecule are highlighted in red.

== Conjugated pi-bond system chromophores ==
The porphyrin moieties in our red blood cells, whose primary function is to bind iron atoms which capture oxygen, result in the heme chromophores which give human blood its red color. Heme is degraded by the body into biliverdin (which gives bruises their blue-green color), which in turn is degraded into bilirubin (which gives patients with jaundice a yellow skin tone).

In the mammalian eye, the molecule retinal is a conjugated chromophore. Retinal begins as 11-cis-retinal, which, upon capturing a photon γ (light) of the correct wavelength, straightens out into all-trans-retinal which pushes against an opsin protein in the retina, which triggers a chemical signaling cascade which results in perception of light or images by the brain.

Just like how two adjacent p-orbitals in a molecule will form a pi-bond, three or more adjacent p-orbitals in a molecule can form a conjugated pi-system. In a conjugated pi-system, electrons are able to capture certain photons as the electrons resonate along a certain distance of p-orbitals - similar to how a radio antenna detects photons along its length. Typically, the more conjugated (longer) the pi-system is, the longer the wavelength of photon can be captured. In other words, with every added adjacent double bond we see in a molecule diagram, we can predict the system will be progressively more likely to appear yellow to our eyes as it is less likely to absorb yellow light and more likely to absorb red light. ("Conjugated systems of fewer than eight conjugated double bonds absorb only in the ultraviolet region and are colorless to the human eye", "Compounds that are blue or green typically do not rely on conjugated double bonds alone.")

In the conjugated chromophores, the electrons jump between energy levels that are extended pi orbitals, created by electron clouds like those in aromatic systems. Common examples include retinal (used in the eye to detect light), various food colorings, fabric dyes (azo compounds), pH indicators, lycopene, β-carotene, and anthocyanins. Various factors in a chromophore's structure go into determining at what wavelength region in a spectrum the chromophore will absorb. Lengthening or extending a conjugated system with more unsaturated (multiple) bonds in a molecule will tend to shift absorption to longer wavelengths. Woodward–Fieser rules can be used to approximate ultraviolet-visible maximum absorption wavelength in organic compounds with conjugated pi-bond systems.

Some of these are metal complex chromophores, which contain a metal in a coordination complex with ligands. Examples are chlorophyll, which is used by plants for photosynthesis and hemoglobin, the oxygen transporter in the blood of vertebrate animals. In these two examples, a metal is complexed at the center of a tetrapyrrole macrocycle ring: the metal being iron in the heme group (iron in a porphyrin ring) of hemoglobin, or magnesium complexed in a chlorin-type ring in the case of chlorophyll. The highly conjugated pi-bonding system of the macrocycle ring absorbs visible light. The nature of the central metal can also influence the absorption spectrum of the metal-macrocycle complex or properties such as excited state lifetime. The tetrapyrrole moiety in organic compounds which is not macrocyclic but still has a conjugated pi-bond system still acts as a chromophore. Examples of such compounds include bilirubin and urobilin, which exhibit a yellow color.

== Auxochrome ==
An auxochrome is a functional group of atoms attached to the chromophore which modifies the ability of the chromophore to absorb light, altering the wavelength or intensity of the absorption.

== Halochromism ==
Halochromism occurs when a substance changes color as the pH changes. This is a property of pH indicators, whose molecular structure changes upon certain changes in the surrounding pH. This change in structure affects a chromophore in the pH indicator molecule. For example, phenolphthalein is a pH indicator whose structure changes as pH changes as shown in the following table:

Structure		
pH	0-8.2	8.2-12
Conditions	acidic or near-neutral	basic
Color name	colorless	pink to fuchsia
Color		

In a pH range of about 0-8, the molecule has three aromatic rings all bonded to a tetrahedral sp^{3} hybridized carbon atom in the middle which does not make the π-bonding in the aromatic rings conjugate. Because of their limited extent, the aromatic rings only absorb light in the ultraviolet region, and so the compound appears colorless in the 0-8 pH range. However, as the pH increases beyond 8.2, that central carbon becomes part of a double bond becoming sp^{2} hybridized and leaving a p orbital to overlap with the π-bonding in the rings. This makes the three rings conjugate together to form an extended chromophore absorbing longer wavelength visible light to show a fuchsia color. At pH ranges outside 0-12, other molecular structure changes result in other color changes; see Phenolphthalein details.

== Common chromophore absorption wavelengths ==
Functional group or compound	Absorption wavelength
Bromophenol blue (yellow form)	591 nm
Malachite green	617 nm
Cyanidin	545 nm
β-carotene	452 nm

== See also ==
- Biological pigment
- Chromatophore
- Fluorophore
- Litmus
- Pharmacophore
- Photophore, glandular organ
- Pigment
- Spectroscopy
- Visual phototransduction
- Woodward's rules
