= Frank Scott (footballer) =

English footballer

Personal information
- Full name: Francis Scott
- Date of birth: 1876
- Place of birth: Boultham, England
- Date of death: 3 July 1937 (aged 60–61)
- Place of death: Lincoln, England
- Height: 5 ft 8 in (1.73 m)
- Position: Inside forward

Senior career*
| Years | Team | Apps | (Gls) |
- Adelaide (Lincoln)
| 1897–1901 | Lincoln City | 45 | (8) |
| 1901–1902 | New Brompton | | |
| 1902–1904 | Brighton & Hove Albion | 45 | (25) |
- * Club domestic league appearances and goals

Francis Scott (1876 – 3 July 1937) was an English professional footballer who made 45 appearances in the Football League playing as an inside forward for Lincoln City. He also played for Southern League clubs New Brompton and Brighton & Hove Albion, for whom he was top scorer in the 1902–03 season with 31 goals in all competitions. He was born in Boultham, Lincoln, Lincolnshire, in 1876 and died in Lincoln in 1937.
