= C5H10O =

The molecular formula C_{5}H_{10}O may refer to:

- Isoprenol
- Isovaleraldehyde (3-methylbutanal)
- 2-Methylbutanal
- Methyl isopropyl ketone
- 2-Methyltetrahydrofuran
- 3-Methyltetrahydrofuran
- Pentanal
- 2-Pentanone
- 3-Pentanone
- Pivaldehyde (2,2-dimethylpropanal)
- Prenol
- Tetrahydropyran
