= Botryococcenes =

- C30 botryococcene

- C33 botryococcene

- C34 botryococcene

Identifiers
CAS Number	C34: 42719-34-6
3D model (JSmol)	C30: Interactive image; C33: Interactive image; C34: Interactive image
ChEBI	C30: CHEBI:70786
ChemSpider	C30: 28533304; C34: 9060409
PubChem CID	C30: 59053142; C33: 90658677; C34: 10885141
UNII	C34: OJL0CPA70A
- InChI: C30: InChI=1S/C30H50/c1-10-30(9,23-14-21-28(7)18-12-16-26(4)5)24-22-29(8)20-13-19-27(6)17-11-15-25(2)3/h10,15-16,19,21-22,24,29H,1,11-14,17-18,20,23H2,2-9H3/b24-22+,27-19+,28-21+/t29-,30-/m1/s1 Key: LRCNPQXZCZKGDI-OFGMELEWSA-N; C33: InChI=1S/C33H56/c1-13-33(12,23-14-15-27(6)16-18-29(8)25(2)3)24-22-28(7)17-19-31(10)32(11)21-20-30(9)26(4)5/h13,15,22,24,28-31H,1-2,4,11,14,16-21,23H2,3,5-10,12H3/b24-22+,27-15+ Key: GUAPAZWRZCOQGT-JQUYWNEBSA-N; C34: InChI=1S/C34H58/c1-14-34(13,24-22-33(12)32(11)20-18-29(8)26(4)5)23-21-27(6)15-16-30(9)31(10)19-17-28(7)25(2)3/h14,21,23,27-30,33H,1-2,4,10-11,15-20,22,24H2,3,5-9,12-13H3/b23-21+/t27-,28+,29+,30+,33+,34+/m1/s1 Key: RRFKZRGEWFCPGV-KWNNYQEVSA-N
- SMILES: C30: C[C@H](CC/C=C(\C)/CCC=C(C)C)/C=C/[C@@](C)(CC/C=C(\C)/CCC=C(C)C)C=C; C33: CC(CCC(C)C(=C)CCC(C)C(=C)C)/C=C/C(C)(CC/C=C(\C)/CCC(C)C(=C)C)C=C; C34: C[C@H](CC[C@H](C)C(=C)CC[C@H](C)C(=C)C)/C=C/[C@@](C)(CC[C@H](C)C(=C)CC[C@H](C)C(=C)C)C=C
- Except where otherwise noted, data are given for materials in their standard state (at 25 °C [77 °F], 100 kPa). Infobox references

Botryococcenes are triterpenoid hydrocarbons thought to be exclusively produced by the green alga B. braunii and are found in modern freshwater and brackish water environments. In the geological record, botryococcenes are preserved as their hydrogenated analogue, botryococcane, and comprise up to 90% of the total organic carbon in certain shale oils and up to 1% of certain crude oils. Due to being a unique biomarker for B. braunii, it is one of the few species that can be directly linked to petroleum formation. In addition, because botryococcenes comprise up to 50% of the algae's dry biomass and are isoprenoids, they have received attention as potentially renewable hydrocarbon resources. Today, there are more than 50 known botryococcenes, all sharing a common C30 base structure.

== Chemical structure ==
The first botryococcene, a C34 hydrocarbon, was identified in 1978 and is the main botryococcene constituent in the algae. However, the precursor for all botryococcenes is the C30 botryococcene, and subsequent higher-order botryococcenes (C31–C34) are generated via methylation or addition of cyclic groups and have a general formula of C_{n}H_{2n-10}. The C30 botryococcene has a backbone of 22 carbon atoms, with double bonds at positions 2, 6, 11, 16, and 20, six methyl groups at positions 2, 6, 10, 13, 17, and 21, and a vinyl group at position 10. Of the 50 identified botryococcenes, only 15 have been structurally characterized. With high molecular weights (>400 amu), botryococcenes have boiling points between 460-485 °C. While toxicity reports for botryococcenes do not exist, a closely related compound, squalene, has low toxicity. Botryococcenes are relatively inert molecules, with their main source of reactivity being the double bonds. These can undergo thiol-ene reactions, forming botryococcene pentathiolate under UV radiation, or hydrogenation to form botryococcanes. The botryococcanes retain the carbon structure of their corresponding botryococcenes but generally have additional isomers since hydrogenation can introduce chiral centers. Both botryococcane and botryococcenes are non-polar compounds with a logP (Measure of solubility in the non-polar solvent octanol) of approximately 14.2, indicating high solubility in non-polar solvents.

== Biological origin ==
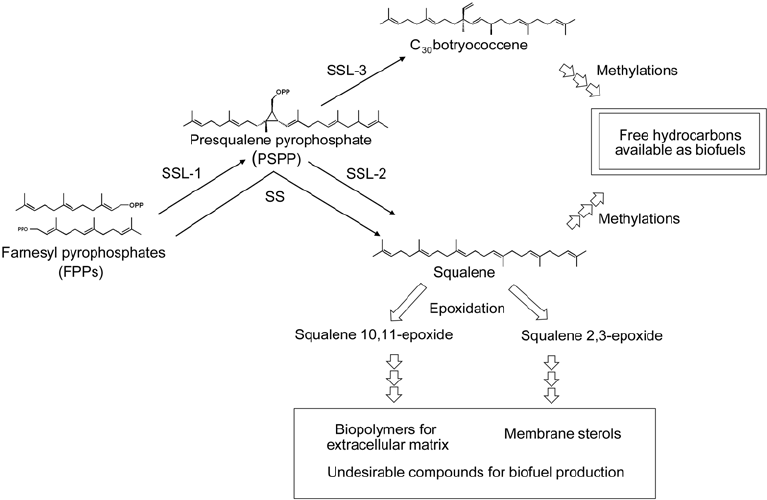
Metabolic pathways for squalene and C30 botryococcene

There are three known strains, often referred to as "Race", of B. braunii, with only the B race producing botryococcene. The precursor, C30, is synthesized from isopentenyl pyrophosphate (IPP) and dimethylallyl pyrophosphate (DMAPP). Given the high production of botryococcene in the algae, understanding the biosynthetic pathways of IPP and DMAPP is important for bioengineering strains suitable for cultivating for biofuels. In eukaryotes, IPP is typically synthesized via the mevalonate (MVA) pathway, which was initially hypothesized to be the pathway used by B. braunii. However, stable isotope labeling experiments have shown that IPP in this species originates from a non-MVA pathway. The precursor (PSPP) for C30 botryococcene is shared with squalene, but the two differ in the enzyme used: squalene is produced by SSL-2, while botryococcene is produced by SSL-3.

== Measurement technique ==
Identification and quantification of botryococcenes and botryococanes are typically performed using gas chromatography coupled mass spectrometry. Due to their non-polar nature, a DB1 or DB5 non-polar column is commonly used to achieve separation. Characteristic fragments include m/z 238, 294, and 448, resulting from cleavage at the quaternary carbon. Additional minor peaks are used to identify isomers and homologues.

== Application as a biomarker and environmental studies ==
=== Freshwater biomarker ===
Botryococcenes are produced only by B. braunii and are primarily preserved in the geologic record as botryococcanes. They are primarily found in lacustrine oil shales, where they are the dominant organic component in formations ranging from the Paleozoic to the Cenozoic age. The alga is associated with torbanite, also known as boghead coal, a coal type formed in freshwater lakes with low clastic input. As B. braunii is exclusively a freshwater or brackish water algae found in temperate and tropical environments, botryococcenes are reliable biomarkers for reconstructing depositional environments of shale. As an example, Botryococcanes and lycopane (Biomarker associated with the L race) was found to co-occur in the Maoming oil shales. In modern environments, B and L races are only found together in tropical and subtropical regions, and it's thus suggested that the Eocene Maoming Basin had a tropical-subtropical climate, which is in agreement with the regions expected paleolatitude.

=== Biotechnological applications ===
Hydrocracking of botryococcenes generates paraffins, naphthenes, olefins, and aromatic hydrocarbons—key components in hydrocarbon fuels such as gasoline, kerosene, and diesel. Because of its promising cracking products and being at a high fractional abundance in B. braunii, the alga has received attention as being a promising renewable biofuel source. However, major challenge is its slow growth rate. The doubling time for B. braunii ranges from 3–7 days, compared to daily doubling in many other microalgae. Research is thus focused on identifying optimal growth conditions, and doubling times as short as 1.4 days have been reported. Optimal temperature for growth is strain-specific, with ~25 °C being common. Another important growth factor is salinity. Being a freshwater species, it's expected that salinity would decrease growth and reduced biomass production. The response to increased salinity levels have also been strain specific, with some strains showing optimal biomass yield at 0.25 M salinity, which is around half of seawater, while other strains giving a maximum growth-yield at 0.02M.

=== Biodegradation and environmental impact ===
Botryococcanes are potential biomarkers for monitoring hydrocarbon degradation at contaminated remote oil exploration and production sites. Their chemical stability compared to the average hydrocarbon allows for tracking their concentration versus the total hydrocarbon pools concentration. Compared to hopanes—another common stable biomarker—botryococcanes, if present, occur in higher abundance which makes them suitable for GC with flame ionization detection (FID). FID is cheaper than GC/MS and can be deployed at contaminated sites. In-situ monitoring avoids potential biodegradation that might occur throughout a sample's transportation to the laboratory. This makes botryococcanes a candidate for on-site monitoring of bioremediation efforts at remote sites.
