= C25H36O5 =

The molecular formula C_{25}H_{36}O_{5} may refer to:

- Manoalide, a calcium channel blocker
- Pregnenolone succinate, a synthetic pregnane steroid and an ester of pregnenolone
- Shortolide A, a natural product isolated from Solidago shortii
