= Lycopane =

Names
- IUPAC name 2,6,10,14,19,23,27,31-octamethyldotriacontane

Identifiers
CAS Number	45316-02-7
3D model (JSmol)	Interactive image
ChemSpider	142715
PubChem CID	162550
CompTox Dashboard (EPA)	DTXSID20963365
- InChI: InChI=1S/C40H82/c1-33(2)19-13-23-37(7)27-17-31-39(9)29-15-25-35(5)21-11-12-22-36(6)26-16-30-40(10)32-18-28-38(8)24-14-20-34(3)4/h33-40H,11-32H2,1-10H3 Key: VZVGMMPGAFGVOS-UHFFFAOYSA-N
- SMILES: CC(C)CCCC(C)CCCC(C)CCCC(C)CCCCC(C)CCCC(C)CCCC(C)CCCC(C)C

Properties
Chemical formula	C_{40}H_{82}
Molar mass	563.096 g·mol^{−1}

Related compounds
Related compounds	Lycopene
- Except where otherwise noted, data are given for materials in their standard state (at 25 °C [77 °F], 100 kPa). Infobox references

Lycopane (C_{40}H_{82}; 2,6,10,14,19,23,27,31-octamethyldotriacontane), a 40 carbon alkane isoprenoid, is a widely present biomarker that is often found in anoxic settings. It has been identified in anoxically deposited lacustrine sediments (such as the Messel formation and the Condor oil shale deposit). It has been found in sulfidic and anoxic hypersaline environments (such as the Sdom Formation). It has been widely identified in modern marine sediments, including the Peru upwelling zone, the Black Sea, and the Cariaco Trench. It has been found only rarely in crude oils.

== Biological origins ==
The pathway for production of lycopane has not been conclusively identified. There are several theories for its origins/production.

=== Methanogenic archaea ===
Some of the earliest theories for the biosynthesis of lycopane center around it being anaerobically produced by methanogenic archaea. Lycopane has been observed in recent marine sediments in contexts where methanogenic activity is occurring. In older sediments, methanogenic activity is harder to conclusively determine, as methane can migrate from other layers and not necessarily be a product of that geological time. It is possible that isoprenoid alkanes such as lycopane serve as biomarkers for methanogenesis and methanogenic archaea.

Lycopane has not yet been directly isolated in any biological organism, so its linkage to methanogenic archaea is conjecture. However, the process has been identified in a different isoprenoid alkane: squalane. Squalane was not initially thought to be directly biologically synthesized, but was later determined to be present in archaea.

Some acyclic unsaturated tetraterpenoids (structurally similar to lycopane) have been detected in Thermococcus hydrothermalis, a deep-sea hydrothermal vent archaea. Lycopane has also been found alongside archaeal ethers in certain marine sediments. These findings provide support for a methanogenic origin of lycopane, but it is not conclusive. Furthermore, lycopane has been identified in water columns that contain sulfate, which is potentially an argument against lycopane having a methanogenic origin. Methanogens are generally not widespread in sulfate-rich environments.

=== Diagenesis of lycopene ===
Lycopane may be sourced from diagenesis of an unsaturated precursor such as lycopene, a carotenoid that is abundantly present in photosynthetic organisms. In cyanobacteria, lycopene can be an important intermediate in the biosynthesis of other carotenoids. Diagenesis, broadly referring to physical and chemical changes that occur while biological material is undergoing fossilization, may include hydrogenation and transformation of unsaturated precursors to alkane derivatives. Some diagenetic time-dependent reduction of double bonds in carotenoids has been observed in marine sediments.

A direct geochemical diagenetic process for the transformation of lycopene to lycopane during sedimentation has not been determined. However, this process has been identified in other carotenoids (e.g. carotene to carotane). Sulfur has been proposed as a general agent in the diagenesis of isoprenoid alkenes to alkanes. A sulfur polymer (with sulfur binding to unsaturated carbons) could eventually yield isoprenoid alkanes, as carbon-sulfur bonds are weaker than carbon-carbon bonds. Some experimental evidence in support of this theory has been gathered, but it has not been demonstrated in any sediment samples.

=== Marine photoautotrophs ===
It has also been theorized that lycopane is directly synthesized by marine photoautotrophs such as cyanobacteria or green algae. Lycopene is abundantly present in marine photosynthetic organisms; possibly it is the precursor in a lycopene-to-lycopane pathway. The detection of lycopa-14(E),18(E)-diene in the green alga Botryococcus braunii strengthens this theory, as the conversion of lycopadiene to lycopane would be simpler and more feasible than that of lycopene to lycopane.

== Measurement techniques ==
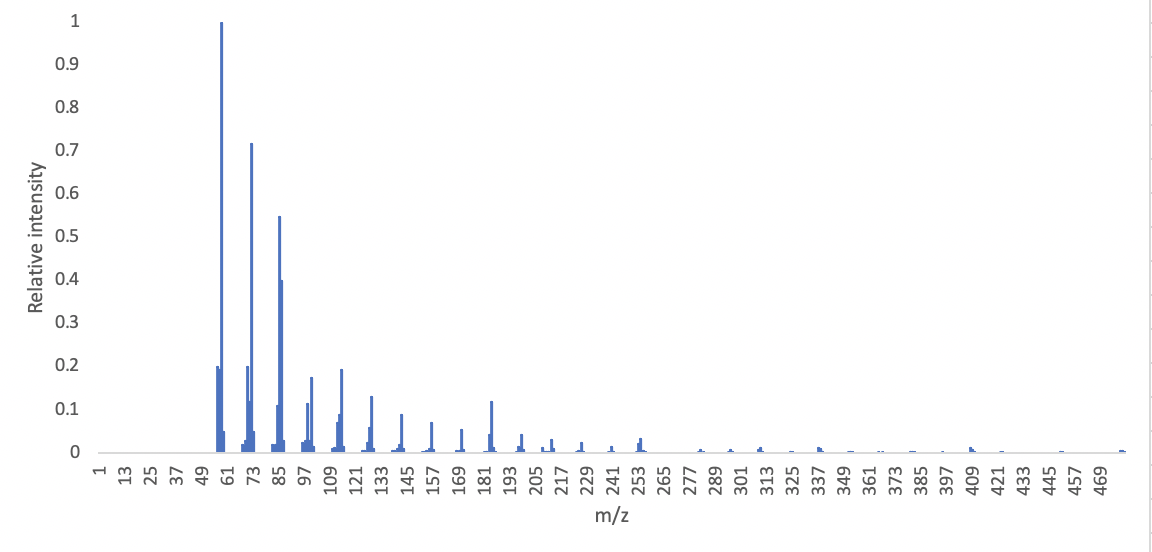
Mass spectrum of lycopane.

=== GC/MS ===
Gas chromatography-mass spectrometry is a common tool for detecting and analyzing biomarkers. Depending on the stationary phase used in the column, lycopane tends to co-elute with the n-C_{35} alkane. Its tail-to-tail linkage yields diagnostic mass fragments. The mass spectrum has a periodic fragmentation pattern.

=== Raman spectroscopy ===
Raman spectroscopy, a non-destructive analytical technique with no sample preparation, is a powerful tool for analyzing biomarkers. Lycopene, the unsaturated carotenoid that lycopane may be derived from, has a very characteristic Raman spectrum that is easily distinguishable. The spectrum of lycopane differs by a strong band at 1455 cm^{−1} (CH_{2} scissoring), a series of bands from 1390–1000 cm^{−1} (C-C stretching), and some bands from 1000–800 cm^{−1} (methyl in-plane rocking and C-H out-of-plane bending).

=== Stable isotope analysis ===
The amount of carbon-13 present in lycopane found in sediment can give indications of its producer, particularly differentiating between methanogenic and algal origin. Lower levels of ^{13}C suggest that the compound originated in methanogens, while higher levels support an algal origin. The high level of ^{13}C found in the Messel shale lycopane (-20.8‰) suggests an algal producer.

== Use as a biomarker (case study: Arabian Sea/Peru Upwelling region) ==
Recent work has proposed elevated levels of lycopane as a proxy for anoxicity. When the C_{35}/C_{31} n-alkane ratio was calculated both within and outside of the Oxygen Minimum Zone (OMZ) in the Arabian Sea, ratios inside of the OMZ were approximately two to three times higher than they were outside of this zone. This increased ratio was determined to be due to the presence of lycopane, which coelutes with C_{35} n-alkane. Thus, it was determined that the lycopane/C_{31} ratio is correlated with degree of anoxicity. Similar trends were observed in the Peru Upwelling region. This further solidifies the viability of lycopane abundance as an indicator of oxicity/anoxicity and provides additional support for a methanogenic origin of lycopane.

== Astrobiological potential ==
One of the challenges involved in searching for life on other planets is the practical limitations of instrumentation. While GC/MS or NMR may give unequivocal evidence of the existence of biomarkers, it is not practical to include these instruments on highly optimized spacecraft. Raman spectroscopy has emerged as a leading technique due to its sensitivity, miniaturizability, and lack of sample preparation.

Carotenoids have long generated astrobiological interest given their diagnostic Raman spectra, their unlikelihood of being abiotically synthesized, and their high preservation potential. Recent work has indicated that the Raman spectrum of lycopane is sufficiently different from that of lycopene. The two molecules are distinguishable. While functionalized carotenoids in themselves are an attractive astrobiological biomarker, detecting their diagenetic products may be equally characteristic of extraterrestrial life. Detection of diagenetically reduced lycopane on other planetary bodies may be an unambiguous indication of life, as diagenesis occurs during biological fossilization.
