= Botryococcus squalene synthase =

Class of enzymes

Identifiers
- EC no.: 1.3.1.96

Databases
- IntEnz: IntEnz view
- BRENDA: BRENDA entry
- ExPASy: NiceZyme view
- KEGG: KEGG entry
- MetaCyc: metabolic pathway
- PRIAM: profile
- PDB structures: RCSB PDB PDBe PDBsum
Search
- PMC: articles
- PubMed: articles
- NCBI: proteins

Botryococcus squalene synthase (EC 1.3.1.96, SSL-2 (gene)) is an enzyme with systematic name squalene:NADP^{+} oxidoreductase. This enzyme catalyses the following chemical reaction

squalene + diphosphate + NADP^{+} $\rightleftharpoons$ presqualene diphosphate + NADPH + H^{+}

This enzyme is isolated from the green alga Botryococcus braunii BOT22.
