= 3-methylbutanal reductase =

Class of enzymes

Identifiers
- EC no.: 1.1.1.265

Databases
- IntEnz: IntEnz view
- BRENDA: BRENDA entry
- ExPASy: NiceZyme view
- KEGG: KEGG entry
- MetaCyc: metabolic pathway
- PRIAM: profile
- PDB structures: RCSB PDB PDBe PDBsum
- Gene Ontology: AmiGO / QuickGO
Search
- PMC: articles
- PubMed: articles
- NCBI: proteins

In enzymology, 3-methylbutanal reductase (EC 1.1.1.265) is an enzyme that catalyzes the chemical reaction

isoamyl alcohol
+ NAD^{+}
H^{+}
H^{+}
isovaleraldehyde
+ NADH

The two substrates of this enzyme are isoamyl alcohol (3-methylbutan-1-ol) and oxidised nicotinamide adenine dinucleotide (NAD^{+}). Its products are isovaleraldehyde (3-methylbutanal), reduced NADH, and a proton. The enzyme can also use the alternative cofactor, nicotinamide adenine dinucleotide phosphate

This enzyme belongs to the family of oxidoreductases, specifically those acting on the CH-OH group of donor with NAD^{+} or NADP^{+} as acceptor. The systematic name of this enzyme class is 3-methylbutanol:NAD(P)^{+} oxidoreductase.
