= Presqualene diphosphate synthase =

Class of enzymes

Identifiers
- EC no.: 2.5.1.103

Databases
- IntEnz: IntEnz view
- BRENDA: BRENDA entry
- ExPASy: NiceZyme view
- KEGG: KEGG entry
- MetaCyc: metabolic pathway
- PRIAM: profile
- PDB structures: RCSB PDB PDBe PDBsum
Search
- PMC: articles
- PubMed: articles
- NCBI: proteins

Presqualene diphosphate synthase (EC 2.5.1.103, SSL-1 (gene)) is an enzyme with systematic name (2E,6E)-farnesyl-diphosphate:(2E,6E)-farnesyl-diphosphate farnesyltransferase (presqualene diphosphate forming). This enzyme catalyses the following chemical reaction

2 (2E,6E)-farnesyl diphosphate $\rightleftharpoons$ presqualene diphosphate + diphosphate

This enzyme is isolated from the green alga Botryococcus braunii BOT22.
