= Carotenosis =

Skin discoloration caused by carotenoids

- Other names: Carotenaemia, xanthaemia, carotenoderma, carotenodermia
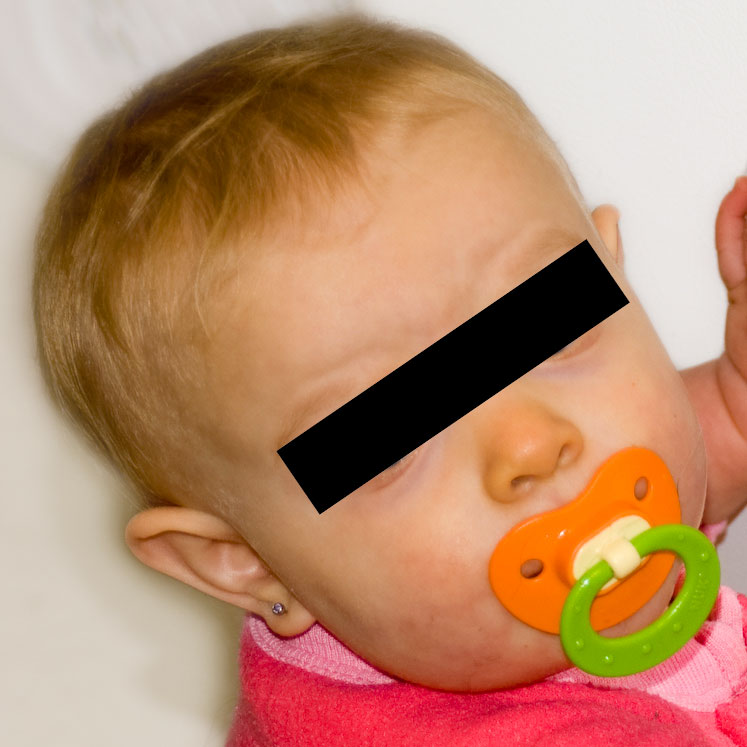
- Carotenoderma visible on the nose
- Specialty: Dermatology

Carotenosis is a benign and reversible medical condition where an excess of dietary carotenoids results in orange discoloration of the outermost skin layer. The discoloration is most easily observed in light-skinned people and may be mistaken for jaundice. Carotenoids are lipid-soluble compounds that include alpha- and beta-carotene, beta-cryptoxanthin, lycopene, lutein, and zeaxanthin. The primary serum carotenoids are beta-carotene, lycopene, and lutein. Serum levels of carotenoids vary between region, ethnicity, and sex in the healthy population. All are absorbed by passive diffusion from the gastrointestinal tract and are then partially metabolized in the intestinal mucosa and liver to vitamin A. From there they are transported in the plasma into the peripheral tissues. Carotenoids are eliminated via sweat, sebum, urine, and gastrointestinal secretions. Carotenoids contribute to normal-appearing human skin color, and are a significant component of physiologic ultraviolet photoprotection.

Carotenemia most commonly occurs in vegetarians and young children with light skin. Carotenemia is more easily appreciated in light-complexioned people, and it may present chiefly as an orange discolouration of the palms and the soles in more darkly pigmented persons. Carotenemia does not cause selective orange discoloration of the conjunctival membranes over the sclerae (whites of the eyes), and thus is usually easy to distinguish from the yellowing of the skin and conjunctiva caused by bile pigments in states of jaundice.

Carotenoderma is deliberately caused by beta-carotenoid treatment of certain photo-sensitive dermatitis diseases such as erythropoietic protoporphyria, where beta carotene is prescribed in quantities which discolor the skin. These high doses of beta carotene have been found to be harmless in studies, though cosmetically displeasing to some. In a recent meta analysis of these treatments, however, the effectiveness of the treatment has been called into question.

== Causes ==
There are three main mechanisms involved in hypercarotenemia: excessive dietary intake of carotenoids, increased serum lipids, and decreased metabolism of carotenoids. The most common reported cause of hypercarotenemia (and thus carotenoderma) is increased intake, either through increased dietary foods or nutritional supplements. This change takes approximately 4 to 7 weeks to be recognized clinically. Numerous ingested substances are rich in carotenoids. Increased serum lipids also cause hypercarotenemia because there are increased circulating lipoproteins that contain bound carotenoids. Finally, in certain disease states, the metabolism and conversion of carotenoids to retinol is slowed, which can lead to decreased clearance and increased plasma levels. Elevated serum beta-carotene does not necessarily result in carotenosis, but the latter is likely to show up when intake is more than 20 mg/day. The average adult intake in the U.S. is around 2.3 mg/day. One medium-sized carrot has about 4.0 mg.

Carotenoderma can be divided into two major types, primary and secondary. Primary carotenoderma is from increased oral ingestion of carotenoids, whereas secondary carotenoderma is caused from underlying disease states that increase serum carotenoids with normal oral intake of these compounds. Primary and secondary carotenoderma can coexist in the same patient.

Foods associated with high levels of carotenoids include:

- Alfalfa
- Apples
- Apricots
- Asparagus
- Beans
- Beet greens
- Berries
- Broccoli
- Brussels sprouts
- Butter
- Cabbage
- Cantaloupes
- Carrots
- Chard
- Cheese
- Collard greens
- Cucumbers
- Egg yolks
- Endives/Escaroles
- Figs
- Kale
- Kiwis
- Lettuce
- Mangoes
- Meat
- Milk
- Mustard
- Nutritional supplements
- Oranges
- Palm oil (unrefined)
- Papayas
- Parsley
- Parsnips
- Peaches
- Pineapples
- Plums
- Prunes
- Pumpkins
- Rutabaga/swedes/yellow turnips
- Seaweed
- Spinach
- Squash
- Sweet potatoes
- Tomatoes
- Watercress
- Yams
- Yellow corn
- Yellow fat

== Physiology ==
Carotenoids are deposited in the intercellular lipids of the stratum corneum, and the color change is most prominent in regions of increased sweating and thickness of this layer. This includes the palms, soles, knees, and nasolabial folds, although the discoloration can be generalized. The primary factor differentiating carotenoderma from jaundice is the characteristic sparing of the sclerae in carotenoderma, which would be involved in jaundice if the bilirubin is at a level to cause skin findings. In contrast to jaundice, carotenoderma is reported to be better observed under artificial light. It is of note that lycopenemia is specifically associated with discoloration of the soft palate and deposition in the liver parenchyma.

== Secondary carotenoderma ==
Disease states associated with carotenoderma include hypothyroidism, diabetes mellitus, anorexia nervosa, nephrotic syndrome, and liver disease. In hypothyroidism and diabetes mellitus, the underlying mechanism of hypercarotenemia is thought to be both impaired conversion of beta-carotene into retinol and the associated increased serum lipids. Diabetes mellitus has also been associated with carotenoderma through disease-specific diets that are rich in vegetables. In the nephrotic syndrome, the hypercarotenemia is related to the associated increased serum lipids, similar to the above entities.

It is of note that kidney dysfunction in general is associated with hypercarotenemia as a result of decreased excretion of carotenoids. Liver dysfunction, regardless of origin, causes hypercarotenemia as a result of the impaired conversion of carotenoids to retinol. This is of particular interest because jaundice and carotenoderma can coexist in the same patient. Anorexia nervosa causes carotenoderma mainly through diets that are rich in carotenoids and the associated hypothyroidism. It tends to be more common in the restricting subtype of this disease, and is associated with numerous other dermatologic manifestations, such as brittle hair and nails, lanugo-like body hair, and xerosis. Although Alzheimer's disease has been associated with carotenoderma in some reports, most studies on serum carotenoids in these patients show that their levels of carotenoids and retinol are depressed, and may be associated with the development of dementia. A true association between Alzheimer's disease and carotenoderma is unclear at this time. There have been case reports in the literature of increased serum carotenoids and carotenoderma that is unresponsive to dietary measures, with a genetic defect in carotenoid metabolic enzymes proposed. Canthaxanthin and astaxanthin are naturally occurring carotenoids that are used in the British and US food industry to add color to foods such as sausage and fish. Canthaxanthin has been used in over-the-counter "tanning pills" in the United States and Europe, but is not currently Food and Drug Administration (FDA)-approved for this purpose in the United States because of its adverse effects. These include hepatitis, urticaria, aplastic anemia, and a retinopathy characterized by yellow deposits and subsequent visual field defects.

Infants and small children are especially prone to carotenoderma because of the cooked, mashed, and pureed vegetables that they eat. Processing and homogenizing causes carotene to become more available for absorption. A small 2.5 ounce jar of baby food sweet potatoes or carrots contains about 400–500% of an infant's recommended daily value of carotene. In addition to that source of carotene, infants are usually prescribed a liquid vitamin supplement, such as Tri-Vi-Sol, which contains vitamin A.

== Diagnosis ==
=== Differential diagnoses ===
Hyperbilirubinemia is the main differential diagnosis to be considered in evaluating jaundice suspected to be carotenemia.

Excessive consumption of lycopene, a plant pigment similar to carotene and present in tomatoes, can cause a deep orange discoloration of the skin. Like carotenodermia, lycopenemia is harmless.

Excessive consumption of elemental silver, silver dust or silver compounds can cause the skin to be colored blue or bluish-grey. This condition is called argyria. A similar skin color can result from prolonged exposure to gold, typically as a little-used medical treatment. The gold-induced greyish skin color is called chrysiasis. Argyria and chrysiasis, however, are irreversible, unlike carotenosis.

== Treatment ==
Carotenemia and carotenoderma is in itself harmless, and does not require treatment. In primary carotenoderma, when the use of high quantities of carotene is discontinued the skin color will return to normal. It may take up to several months, however, for this to happen. Infants with this condition should not be taken off prescribed vitamin supplements unless advised to do so by the child's pediatrician.

As to underlying disorders in secondary carotinemia and carotenoderma, treatment depends wholly on the cause.

== See also ==
- Argyria
- Diabetic dermadromes
- List of cutaneous conditions
- Xanthochromism
