= ACPT =

ACPT may refer to:

- American Crossword Puzzle Tournament
- Ditrans,polycis-polyprenyl diphosphate synthase ((2E,6E)-farnesyl diphosphate specific), an enzyme also known as ACPT
