= Lycopene =

Carotenoid pigment

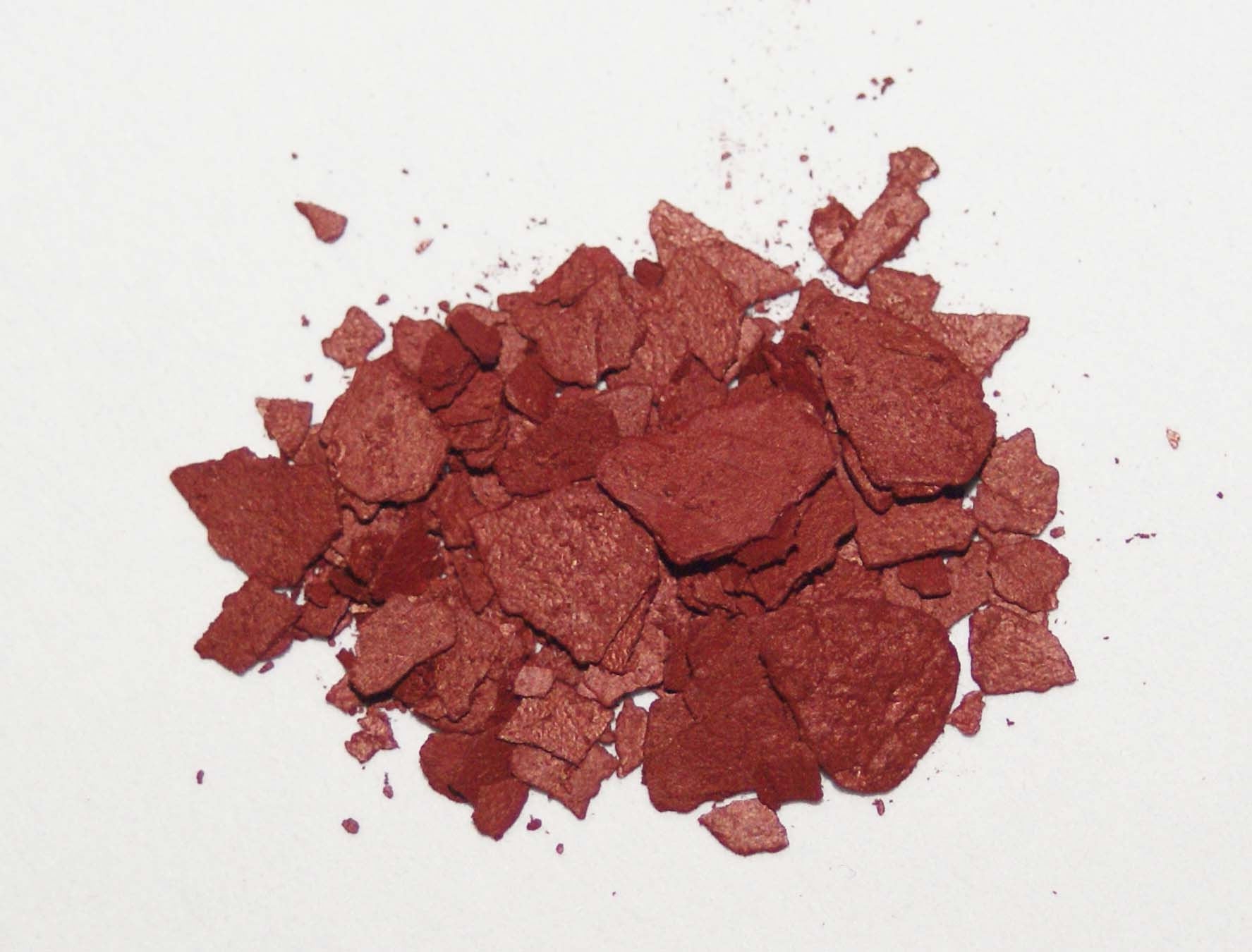

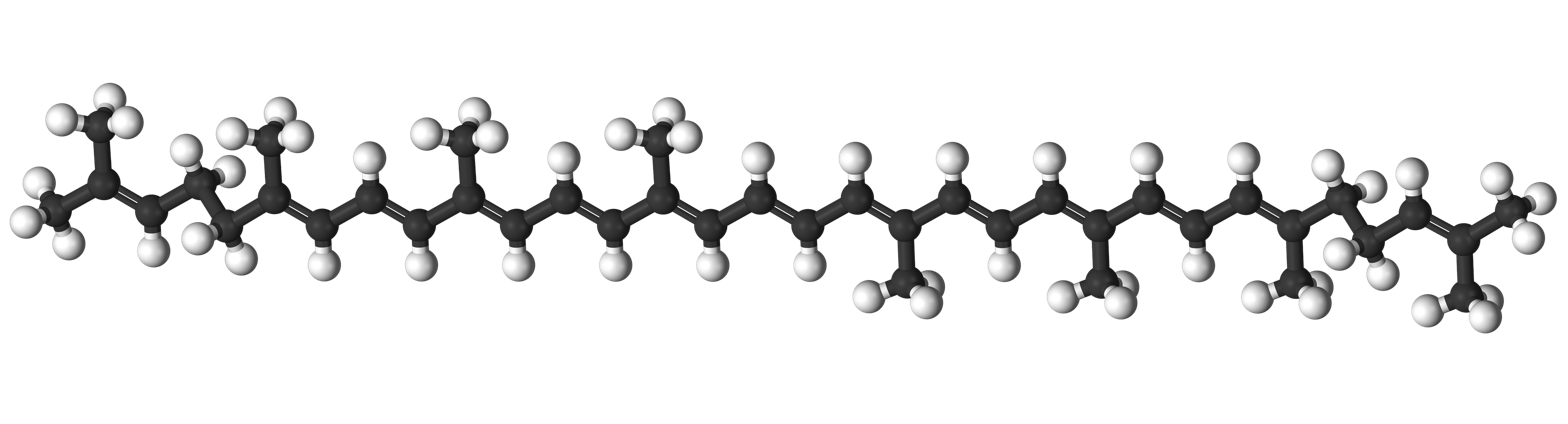

Names
- IUPAC name ψ,ψ-Carotene
- Systematic IUPAC name (6E,8E,10E,12E,14E,16E,18E,20E,22E,24E,26E)-2,6,10,14,19,23,27,31-Octamethyldotriaconta-2,6,8,10,12,14,16,18,20,22,24,26,30-tridecene

Identifiers
| CAS Number | 502-65-8 |
| 3D model (JSmol) | Interactive image |
| ChEBI | CHEBI:15948 |
| ChEMBL | ChEMBL501174 |
| ChemSpider | 394156 |
| ECHA InfoCard | 100.007.227 |
| EC Number | 207-949-1 |
| E number | E160d (colours) |
| PubChem CID | 446925 |
| UNII | SB0N2N0WV6 |
| CompTox Dashboard (EPA) | DTXSID2046593 |
- InChI: InChI=1S/C40H56/c1-33(2)19-13-23-37(7)27-17-31-39(9)29-15-25-35(5)21-11-12-22-36(6)26-16-30-40(10)32-18-28-38(8)24-14-20-34(3)4/h11-12,15-22,25-32H,13-14,23-24H2,1-10H3/b12-11+,25-15+,26-16+,31-17+,32-18+,35-21+,36-22+,37-27+,38-28+,39-29+,40-30+ Key: OAIJSZIZWZSQBC-GYZMGTAESA-N; InChI=1/C40H56/c1-33(2)19-13-23-37(7)27-17-31-39(9)29-15-25-35(5)21-11-12-22-36(6)26-16-30-40(10)32-18-28-38(8)24-14-20-34(3)4/h11-12,15-22,25-32H,13-14,23-24H2,1-10H3/b12-11+,25-15+,26-16+,31-17+,32-18+,35-21+,36-22+,37-27+,38-28+,39-29+,40-30+ Key: OAIJSZIZWZSQBC-GYZMGTAEBZ
- SMILES: C(\C=C\C=C(\CC/C=C(\C)C)C)(=C/C=C/C(=C/C=C/C=C(/C=C/C=C(/C=C/C=C(\C)CC\C=C(/C)C)C)C)C)C

Properties
| Chemical formula | C_{40}H_{56} |
| Molar mass | 536.888 g·mol^{−1} |
| Appearance | deep red solid |
| Density | 0.889 g/cm^{3} |
| Melting point | 177 °C (351 °F; 450 K) |
| Boiling point | 660.9 °C (1,221.6 °F; 934.0 K) at 760 mmHg |
| Solubility in water | insoluble |
| Solubility | soluble in CS_{2}, CHCl_{3}, THF, ether, C_{6}H_{14}, vegetable oil insoluble in CH_{3}OH, C_{2}H_{5}OH |
| Solubility in hexane | 1 g/L (14 °C) |
| Vapor pressure | 1.33·10^{−16} mmHg (25 °C) |

Hazards
- Occupational safety and health (OHS/OSH)
| Main hazards | Combustible |
| NFPA 704 (fire diamond) | 0 1 0 |
| Flash point | 350.7 °C (663.3 °F; 623.8 K) |

Supplementary data page
- Lycopene (data page)
- Except where otherwise noted, data are given for materials in their standard state (at 25 °C [77 °F], 100 kPa). verify (what is ?) Infobox references

Lycopene (from New Latin: Lycopersicon, the name of a former tomato genus) is a bright red carotenoid hydrocarbon found in tomatoes and other red fruits and vegetables. This organic compound is classified as a tetraterpene and a carotene.

It has the E number E160d when used as a food colouring in Europe.

== Occurrence ==
Aside from tomatoes or tomato products like ketchup, it is found in watermelons, grapefruits, red guavas, and baked beans. It has no vitamin A activity.

In plants, algae, and other photosynthetic organisms, lycopene is an intermediate in the biosynthesis of many carotenoids, including beta-carotene, which is responsible for yellow, orange, or red pigmentation, photosynthesis, and photoprotection.

Like all carotenoids, lycopene is a tetraterpene. It is soluble in fat, but insoluble in water. Eleven conjugated double bonds give lycopene its deep red color.

Owing to the strong color, lycopene is used as a food coloring (registered as E160d) and is approved for use in the US, Australia and New Zealand (registered as 160d), and the European Union (E160d).

== Structure and physical properties ==
Lycopene is a symmetrical tetraterpene because it consists entirely of carbon and hydrogen and is derived from eight isoprene subunits. Isolation procedures for lycopene were first reported in 1910, and the structure of the molecule was determined by 1931. In its natural, all-trans form, the molecule is long and somewhat flat, constrained by its system of 11 conjugated double bonds. The extended conjugation is responsible for its deep red color.

Plants and photosynthetic bacteria produce all-trans lycopene. When exposed to light or heat, lycopene can undergo isomerization to any of a number of cis-isomers, which have a less linear shape. Isomers distinct stabilities, with highest stability: 5-cis ≥ all-trans ≥ 9-cis ≥ 13-cis > 15-cis > 7-cis > 11-cis: lowest. In human blood, various cis-isomers constitute more than 60% of the total lycopene concentration, but the biological effects of individual isomers have not been investigated.

Lycopene is a key intermediate in the biosynthesis of many carotenoids.

Carotenoids like lycopene are found in photosynthetic pigment-protein complexes in plants, photosynthetic bacteria, fungi, and algae. They are responsible for the bright orange–red colors of fruits and vegetables, perform various functions in photosynthesis, and protect photosynthetic organisms from excessive light damage. Lycopene is a key intermediate in the biosynthesis of carotenoids, such as beta-carotene, and xanthophylls.

Dispersed lycopene molecules can be encapsulated into carbon nanotubes enhancing their optical properties. Efficient energy transfer occurs between the encapsulated dye and nanotube—light is absorbed by the dye and without significant loss is transferred to the nanotube. Encapsulation increases chemical and thermal stability of lycopene molecules; it also allows their isolation and individual characterization.

=== Biosynthesis ===
The unconditioned biosynthesis of lycopene in eukaryotic plants and in prokaryotic cyanobacteria is similar, as are the enzymes involved. Synthesis begins with mevalonic acid, which is converted into dimethylallyl pyrophosphate. This is then condensed with three molecules of isopentenyl pyrophosphate (an isomer of dimethylallyl pyrophosphate), to give the 20-carbon geranylgeranyl pyrophosphate. Two molecules of this product are then condensed in a tail-to-tail configuration to give the 40-carbon phytoene, the first committed step in carotenoid biosynthesis. Through several desaturation steps, phytoene is converted into lycopene. The two terminal isoprene groups of lycopene can be cyclized to produce beta-carotene, which can then be transformed into a wide variety of xanthophylls.

== Diet ==
=== Consumption by humans ===
Absorption of lycopene requires that it be combined with bile salts and fat to form micelles. Intestinal absorption of lycopene is enhanced by the presence of fat and by cooking. Lycopene dietary supplements (in oil) may be more efficiently absorbed than lycopene from food.

Lycopene is not an essential nutrient for humans, but is commonly found in the diet mainly from dishes prepared from tomatoes. The median and 99th percentile of dietary lycopene intake have been estimated to be 5.2 and 123 mg/d, respectively.

=== Sources ===
Dietary sources of lycopene
| Source | mg wet weight |
|---|---|
| Gac aril | 2~6 per gram |
| Raw tomato | 4.6 per cup |
| Tomato juice | 22 per cup |
| Tomato paste | 75 per cup |
| Tomato ketchup | 2.5 per tablespoon |
| Watermelon | 13 per wedge |
| Pink grapefruit | 2 per half grapefruit |

Fruits and vegetables that are high in lycopene include autumn olive, gac, tomatoes, watermelon, pink grapefruit, pink guava, papaya, seabuckthorn, wolfberry (goji, a berry relative of tomato), and rosehip. Ketchup is a common dietary source of lycopene. Although gac (Momordica cochinchinensis Spreng) has the highest content of lycopene of any known fruit or vegetable (multiple times more than tomatoes), tomatoes and tomato-based sauces, juices, and ketchup account for more than 85% of the dietary intake of lycopene for most people. The lycopene content of tomatoes depends on variety and increases as the fruit ripens.

Unlike other fruits and vegetables, where nutritional content such as vitamin C is diminished upon cooking, processing of tomatoes increases the concentration of bioavailable lycopene. Lycopene in tomato paste is up to four times more bioavailable than in fresh tomatoes. Processed tomato products such as pasteurized tomato juice, soup, sauce, and ketchup contain a higher concentration of bioavailable lycopene compared to raw tomatoes.

Cooking and crushing tomatoes (as in the canning process) and serving in oil-rich dishes (such as spaghetti sauce or pizza) greatly increases assimilation from the digestive tract into the bloodstream. Lycopene is fat-soluble, so the oil is said to help absorption. Gac has high lycopene content derived mainly from its seed coats. Cara Cara navel oranges, and other citrus fruit, such as pink grapefruits, also contain lycopene. Some foods that do not appear red also contain lycopene, e.g., baked beans. When lycopene is used as a food additive (E160d), it is usually obtained from tomatoes.

Lycopene is also available in nutraceuticals such as Ateronon, which contains lycopene in a whey matrix (lactolycopene).

=== Adverse effects ===
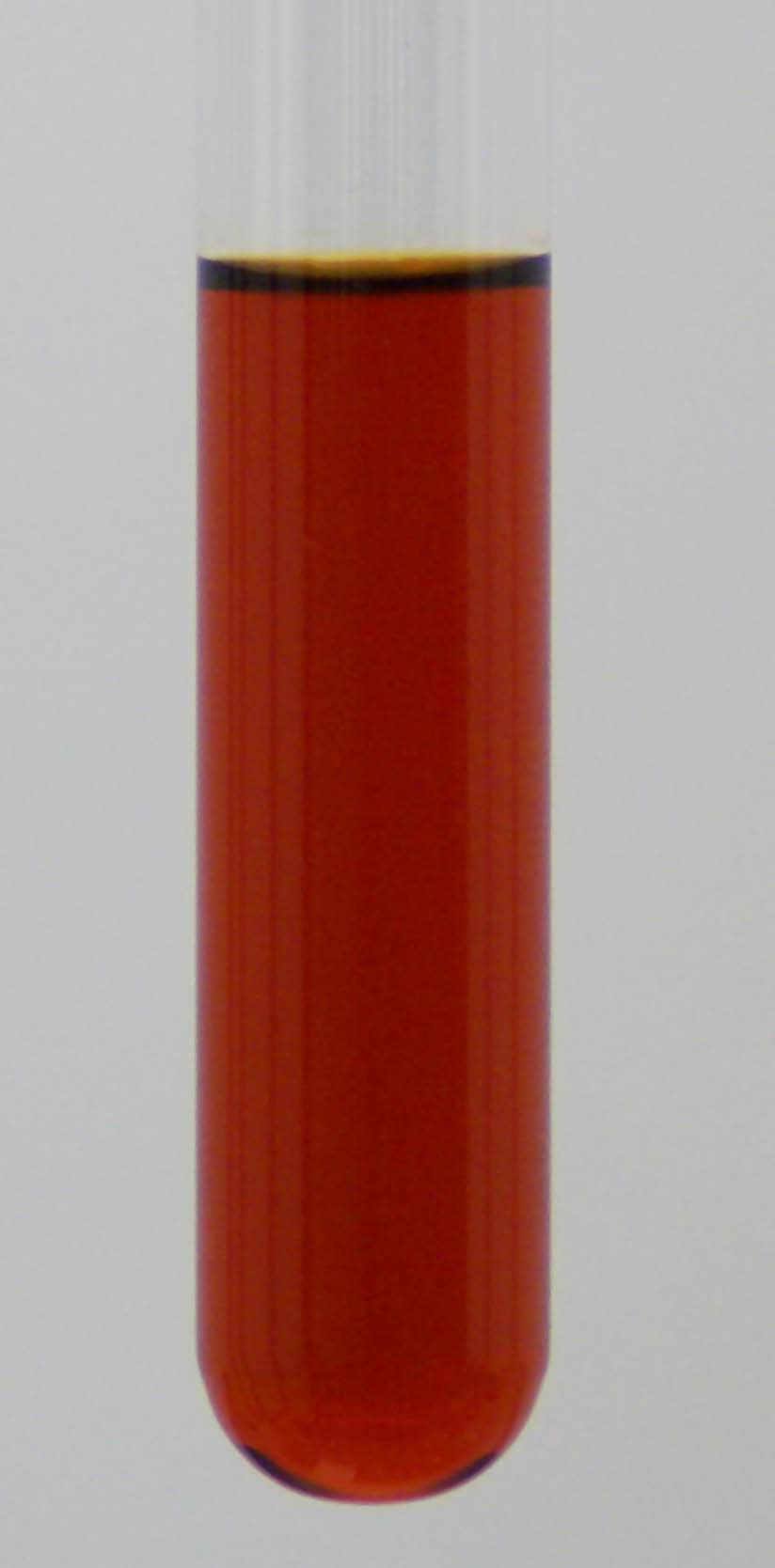
Test tube containing a dichloromethane solution of lycopene

Lycopene is non-toxic and commonly found in the diet, mainly from tomato products. There are cases of intolerance or allergic reaction to dietary lycopene, which may cause diarrhea, nausea, stomach pain or cramps, gas, and loss of appetite. Lycopene may increase the risk of bleeding when taken with anticoagulant drugs. Because lycopene may cause low blood pressure, interactions with drugs that affect blood pressure may occur. Lycopene may affect the immune system, the nervous system, sensitivity to sunlight, or drugs used for stomach ailments.

Lycopenemia is an orange discoloration of the skin that is observed with high intakes of lycopene. The discoloration is expected to fade after discontinuing excessive lycopene intake.

== Research and potential health effects ==
A 2020 review of randomized controlled trials found conflicting evidence for lycopene having an effect on cardiovascular risk factors, whereas a 2017 review concluded that tomato products and lycopene supplementation reduced blood lipids and blood pressure.

A 2015 review found that dietary lycopene was associated with reduced risk of prostate cancer, whereas a 2021 meta-analysis found that dietary lycopene did not affect prostate cancer risk. Other reviews concluded that research has been insufficient to establish whether lycopene consumption affects human health.

=== Regulatory status in Europe and the United States ===
In a review of literature on lycopene and its potential benefit in the diet, the European Food Safety Authority concluded there was insufficient evidence for lycopene having antioxidant effects in humans, particularly in skin, heart function, or vision protection from ultraviolet light.

Although lycopene from tomatoes has been tested in humans for cardiovascular diseases and prostate cancer, no effect on any disease was found. The US Food and Drug Administration, in rejecting manufacturers' requests in 2005 to allow "qualified labeling" for lycopene and the reduction of various cancer risks, provided a conclusion that remained in effect as of 2015:

no studies provided information about whether lycopene intake may reduce the risk of any of the specific forms of cancer. Based on the above, FDA concludes that there is no credible evidence supporting a relationship between lycopene consumption, either as a food ingredient, a component of food, or as a dietary supplement, and any of these cancers.

In a review of research through 2024, the US National Cancer Institute concluded that the FDA has not approved the use of lycopene as effective for treating any medical condition, including various types of cancer.

== See also ==
- Lycopene (data page)
- Lycopane
- Nutrition
- Tocopherol
- Tocotrienol
- Tomatine
