= Botryococcene C-methyltransferase =

Enzyme

Identifiers
- EC no.: 2.1.1.263

Databases
- IntEnz: IntEnz view
- BRENDA: BRENDA entry
- ExPASy: NiceZyme view
- KEGG: KEGG entry
- MetaCyc: metabolic pathway
- PRIAM: profile
- PDB structures: RCSB PDB PDBe PDBsum
Search
- PMC: articles
- PubMed: articles
- NCBI: proteins

Botryococcene C-methyltransferase (EC 2.1.1.263, TMT-3) is an enzyme with systematic name S-adenosyl-L-methionine:botryococcene C-methyltransferase.

== Function ==
This enzyme catalyses the following chemical reaction:

2 S-adenosyl-L-methionine + C30 botryococcene $\rightleftharpoons$ 2 S-adenosyl-L-homocysteine + 3,20-dimethyl-1,2,21,22-tetradehydro-2,3,20,21-tetrahydrobotryococcene (overall reaction)
(1a) S-adenosyl-L-methionine + C30 botryococcene $\rightleftharpoons$ S-adenosyl-L-homocysteine + 3-methyl-1,2-didehydro-2,3-dihydrobotryococcene
(1b) S-adenosyl-L-methionine + 3-methyl-1,2-didehydro-2,3-dihydrobotryococcene $\rightleftharpoons$ S-adenosyl-L-homocysteine + 3,20-dimethyl-1,2,21,22-tetradehydro-2,3,20,21-tetrahydrobotryococcene
(2a) S-adenosyl-L-methionine + C30 botryococcene $\rightleftharpoons$ S-adenosyl-L-homocysteine + 20-methyl-21,22-didehydro-20,21-dihydrobotryococcene
(2b) S-adenosyl-L-methionine + 20-methyl-21,22-didehydro-20,21-dihydrobotryococcene $\rightleftharpoons$ S-adenosyl-L-homocysteine + 3,20-dimethyl-1,2,21,22-tetradehydro-2,3,20,21-tetrahydrobotryococcene

This enzyme is isolated from the green alga Botryococcus braunii BOT22.
