= C40H82 =

The molecular formula C_{40}H_{82} may refer to:

- Lycopane, an alkane isoprenoid
- Tetracontane, an alkane
- 15,19,23-trimethylheptatriacontane, an alkane pheromone
