= Squalene methyltransferase =

Identifiers
- EC no.: 2.1.1.262

Databases
- IntEnz: IntEnz view
- BRENDA: BRENDA entry
- ExPASy: NiceZyme view
- KEGG: KEGG entry
- MetaCyc: metabolic pathway
- PRIAM: profile
- PDB structures: RCSB PDB PDBe PDBsum
Search
- PMC: articles
- PubMed: articles
- NCBI: proteins

Squalene methyltransferase (EC 2.1.1.262, TMT-1, TMT-2) is an enzyme with systematic name S-adenosyl-L-methionine:squalene C-methyltransferase. This enzyme catalyses the following chemical reaction

2 S-adenosyl-L-methionine + squalene $\rightleftharpoons$ 2 S-adenosyl-L-homocysteine + 3,22-dimethyl-1,2,23,24-tetradehydro-2,3,22,23-tetrahydrosqualene (overall reaction)
(1a) S-adenosyl-L-methionine + squalene $\rightleftharpoons$ S-adenosyl-L-homocysteine + 3-methyl-1,2-didehydro-2,3-dihydrosqualene
(1b) S-adenosyl-L-methionine + 3-methyl-1,2-didehydro-2,3-dihydrosqualene $\rightleftharpoons$ S-adenosyl-L-homocysteine + 3,22-dimethyl-1,2,23,24-tetradehydro-2,3,22,23-tetrahydrosqualene

There are two isoforms in the green alga Botryococcus braunii BOT22 that differ in their specificity.
