= Pyrogallolarenes =

A pyrogallolarene (also calix[4]pyrogallolarene) is a macrocycle, or a cyclic oligomer, based on the condensation of pyrogallol (1,2,3-trihydroxybenzene) and an aldehyde. Pyrogallolarenes are a type of calixarene, and a subset of resorcinarenes that are substituted with a hydroxyl at the 2-position.

Pyrogallolarenes, like all resorcinarenes, form inclusion complexes with other molecules forming a host–guest complex. Pyrogallolarenes (like resorcinarenes) self-assemble into larger supramolecular structures forming a hydrogen-bonded hexamer. The pyrogallolarene hexamer is unique from those formed from resorcinarene, in that it does not incorporate solvent molecules into the structure. Both in the crystalline state and in organic solvents, six molecules will form an assembly with an internal volume of around one cubic nanometer (nanocapsules) and shapes similar to the Archimedean solids. A number of solvent or other molecules may reside in the capsule interior. The pyrogallolarene hexamer is generally more stable than the resorcinarene hexamer, even in polar solvents.

== Synthesis ==
The pyrogallolarene macrocycle is typically prepared by condensation of pyrogallol and an aldehyde in concentrated acid solution in the presence of an alcohol solvent, usually methanol or ethanol. The reaction conditions can usually be carefully adjusted to precipitate the pure product or the product may be purified by recrystallization.

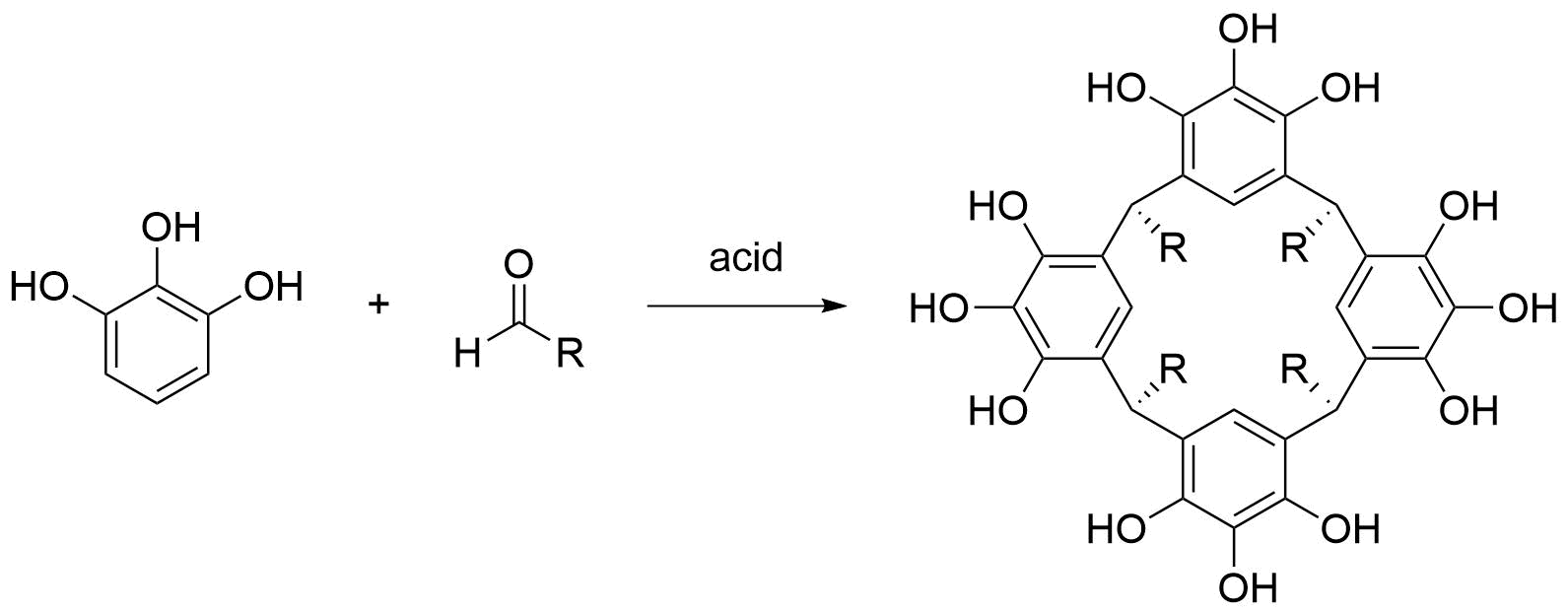
Preparation of resorcin[4]arenes from resorcinol and an aldehyde.

Pyrogallol[4]arene is simply made by mixing a solvent-free dispersion of isovaleraldehyde with pyrogallol, and a catalytic amount of p-toluenesulfonic acid, in a mortar and pestle.
