= C40H64 =

The molecular formula C_{40}H_{64} (molar mass: 544.94 g/mol, exact mass: 544.5008 u) may refer to:

- Phytoene
- any tetraterpene
