= Polyprenol =

Identifiers
CAS Number	308068-00-0; 153857-77-3
ChemSpider	none

Properties
Chemical formula	H-(C_{5}H_{8})_{n}-OH
Appearance	Transparent oily liquid
Density	0.902–0.905 g/cm^{3}
Solubility in water	Insoluble
- Except where otherwise noted, data are given for materials in their standard state (at 25 °C [77 °F], 100 kPa). verify (what is ?) Infobox references

Polyprenols are natural long-chain isoprenoid alcohols of the general formula H-(C_{5}H_{8})n-OH, where n is the number of isoprene units. Any prenol with more than 4 isoprene units is a polyprenol. Polyprenols play an important function, acting as natural bioregulators and are found in small quantities in various plant tissues. Dolichols, which are found in all living creatures, including humans, are their 2,3-dihydro derivatives.

== Sources ==
Live trees are known to contain polyprenols. The needles of conifer trees are one of the richest sources of polyprenols. They are also present in shiitake mushrooms in trace amounts.

== Research ==
Polyprenols have been studied for more than 30 years. Interest has been strongest in Russia, Europe, Japan, India, and the United States. In the early 1930s, a scientific team at the Forest Technical Academy in St. Petersburg, Russia led by Fyodor Solodky, the founder of Forest Biochemistry, and Asney Agranet, began research into the composition of conifer tree needles. They were intrigued by the trees' ability to remain disease free in extremes of temperature ± 40 °C. Development of Solodky's research led Russian scientists to isolate a completely different class of organic substance from the needles, including polyprenols.

== Functions ==
Polyprenols are low molecular natural bioregulators (physiologically active), playing a significant modulating role in the cellular process in plants referred to as biosynthesis.

What polyprenols are to plants, dolichols are to all living creatures, including man. They are in fact of a very similar chemical composition. Dolichols are a derivative of polyprenols with a saturated isoprene unit.

Through dolichols, the dolichol phosphate cycle occurs. The dolichol phosphate cycle plays a major role in the synthesis of glycoproteins.

All proteins from secretions, membranes and intracellular glycoproteins form the basis for the building of membrane receptors which are used in the production of insulin, adrenaline, estrogen, testosterone and other hormones and enzymes. Seemingly, dolichols have an important role in maintenance of the correct lipid composition of membranes. Decreased levels of dolichols have been connected to higher levels of peroxidation of lipids.

The dolichol phosphate cycle facilitates the process of cellular membrane glycosylation, that is, the synthesis of glycoproteins that control the interactions of cells, support the immune system and the stabilization of protein molecules. Out of all these glycoproteins, P-glycoprotein has been found to create drug resistance to multiple cancer treatments and keep cancer cells alive.

The pharmacological activity of polyprenols takes place in the liver, where they are metabolized into dolichols.

== Potential medical applications ==
The interest in polyprenols and dolichols is associated with their wide range of demonstrated biological activity and extremely low toxicity.

Polyprenols cellular reparation and spermatogenesis, and have antistress, adaptogenic, antiulcerogenic and wound-healing activity. Dolichols have antioxidant activity and protect cell membranes from peroxidation. Experiments on mice have demonstrated that polyprenols have antiviral activity, in particular against influenza viruses. It has been established that the dolichol level in liver tumor cells are reduced in comparison with healthy hepatic cells.

The Australian pharmaceutical company Solagran Limited has been investigating the medical significance of polyprenols.
