= Botryococcene synthase =

Class of enzymes

Identifiers
- EC no.: 1.3.1.97

Databases
- IntEnz: IntEnz view
- BRENDA: BRENDA entry
- ExPASy: NiceZyme view
- KEGG: KEGG entry
- MetaCyc: metabolic pathway
- PRIAM: profile
- PDB structures: RCSB PDB PDBe PDBsum
Search
- PMC: articles
- PubMed: articles
- NCBI: proteins

Botryococcene synthase (EC 1.3.1.97, SSL-3 (gene)) is an enzyme with systematic name C_{30} botryococcene:NADP^{+} oxidoreductase. This enzyme catalyses the following chemical reaction

C_{30} botryococcene + NADP^{+} + diphosphate $\rightleftharpoons$ presqualene diphosphate + NADPH + H^{+}

This enzyme is isolated from the green alga Botryococcus braunii BOT22.
