= Ateronon =

Ateronon is a nutraceutical composed of lactolycopene, a combination of lycopene from tomato oleoresin and a whey protein matrix which increases the absorption / bioavailability of lycopene.

A report containing data on Ateronon was presented at the British Cardiovascular Society Conference in June 2014.

== Studies ==
LactoLycopene has been used in numerous studies focused on lycopene bioavailability. A University of Cambridge study shows that lycopene levels in the blood rose between 60% and 100% within two months for people taking LactoLycopene, while another study at Boston's Brigham & Women's Hospital, run by Harvard Medical School, found that it increased average blood levels of lycopene at both six and 12 months.

It has also been used to investigate the effects of lycopene on heart function and male fertility.

A study at the Cleveland Clinic found that lycopene can boost sperm quality by up to 70 per cent, while a team of researchers at the University of Sheffield found that LactoLycopene supplementation significantly increases the percentage of fast progressive sperm as well as normal and healthy sperm forms.

== History ==
Ateronon was developed by Cambridge Theranostics Ltd, UK, and launched in 2009. The patent is currently held by its successor company, FutureYou Cambridge.
