= Lycopenemia =

- Specialty: Dermatology

Lycopenemia is a harmless skin condition caused by excessive ingestion of red foods containing lycopene, such as tomatoes, red cabbage, chili beans, and various fruits and berries, which leads to a reddish discoloration of the skin.

== See also ==
- Carotenosis
- Skin lesion
