= Chu 13 =

Culture medium used in microbiology

CHU 13 medium is a culture medium used in microbiology for the growth of certain algal species, first published by S.P. Chu in 1942. It is used as growth medium for the biofuel candidate alga Botryococcus braunii.

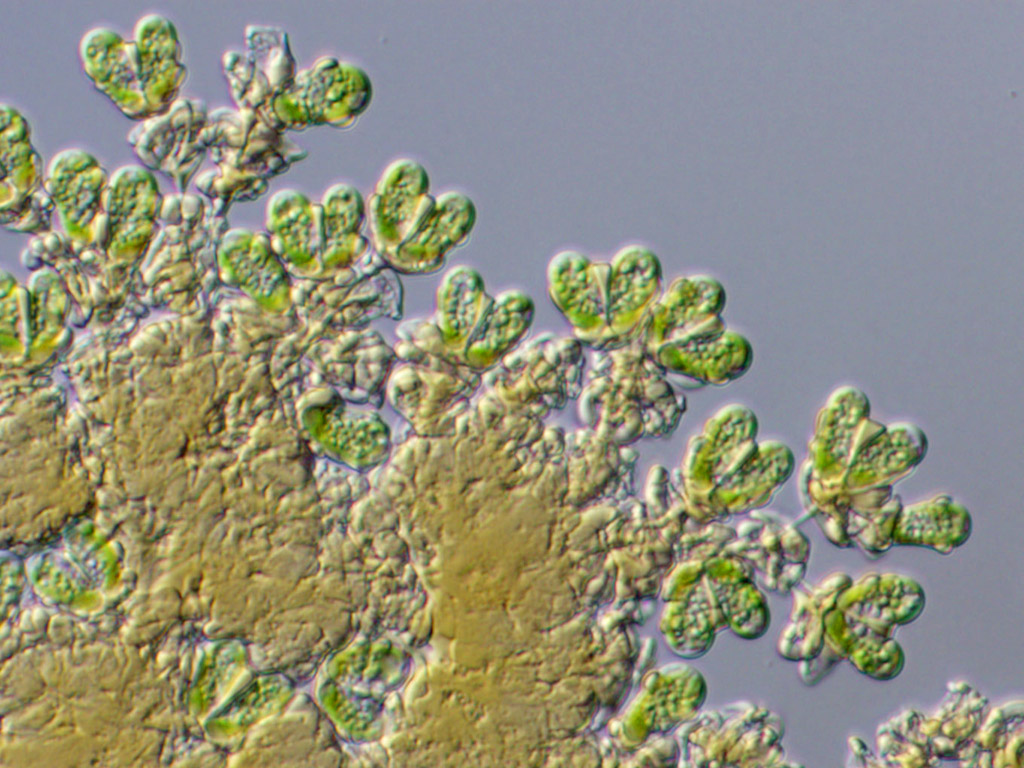
Botryococcus braunii

CHU 13 includes essential minerals and trace elements that are required by algae for growth, but does not include a carbon source and so is only appropriate for growth of phototrophs. It can be prepared as either a liquid medium or as an agar medium.

Modified CHU13 Medium
Compound	mg/L
KNO_{3}	400
K_{2}HPO_{4}	80
CaCl_{2} dihydrate	107
MgSO_{4} heptahydrate	200
Ferric citrate	20
Citric acid	100
CoCl_{2}	0.02
H_{3}BO_{3}	5.72
MnCl_{2} tetrahydrate	3.62
ZnSO_{4} heptahydrate	0.44
CuSO_{4} pentahydrate	0.16
Na_{2}MoO_{4}	0.084
0.072 N H_{2}SO_{4}	1 drop

The remaining volume is pure, de-ionized water.

Because it is difficult to weigh out some of the trace minerals, it is advisable to create a mixture of all components at a large concentration, such as a thousand times these measures, and then mix with the appropriate amount of (pure, de-ionized) water. Correct pH to 7.5, and then autoclave.
