= Ditrans,polycis-polyprenyl diphosphate synthase ((2E,6E)-farnesyl diphosphate specific) =

Identifiers
- EC no.: 2.5.1.87

Databases
- IntEnz: IntEnz view
- BRENDA: BRENDA entry
- ExPASy: NiceZyme view
- KEGG: KEGG entry
- MetaCyc: metabolic pathway
- PRIAM: profile
- PDB structures: RCSB PDB PDBe PDBsum
Search
- PMC: articles
- PubMed: articles
- NCBI: proteins

Ditrans,polycis-polyprenyl diphosphate synthase ((2E,6E)-farnesyl diphosphate specific) (EC 2.5.1.87, RER2, Rer2p, Rer2p Z-prenyltransferase, Srt1p, Srt2p Z-prenyltransferase, ACPT, dehydrodolichyl diphosphate synthase 1) is an enzyme with systematic name (2E,6E)-farnesyl-diphosphate:isopentenyl-diphosphate cistransferase (adding 10--55 isopentenyl units). This enzyme catalyses the following chemical reaction

(2E,6E)-farnesyl diphosphate + n isopentenyl diphosphate $\rightleftharpoons$ n diphosphate + ditrans, polycis-polyprenyl diphosphate (n $\rightleftharpoons$ 10--55)

The enzyme is involved in biosynthesis of dolichol (a long-chain polyprenol) with a saturated alpha-isoprene unit.
