= Carotane =

Plant pigment

The structure of carotane (C_{40}H_{78}) compared to that of carotene (C_{40}H_{56}).

Carotane is a plant pigment that belongs to a class of tetraterpenes called carotenoids. These tetraterpenes are known for their yellow, orange, and red colors as these are organic pigments. These colors are beneficial to their host species that tend to be plants and algae. Within plants, carotenoids play the major roles of allowing light to be absorbed via photosynthesis as well as providing photoprotection through a non-photochemical quenching.

The tetraterpene is also a product of the degradation of carotene and thus represents an important biomarker. While carotene has double bonds, carotane only has single bonds. This is the only difference in their structures, and carotane represents the degradation of carotene. Given the length of time it takes to degrade carotane, it is a marker for geological time.

== Measurement techniques ==
=== Green River Formation ===
Carotane was first measures in the Green River Formation. It was discovered using gas-liquid chromatography and GC/MS. The sample was purified with a thin layer of Ag^{+} silica, and larger samples of 5 μg were used to give more accurate results and reduce the noise in the MS peaks. What was found was the degradation results of carotene.

== Preservation ==
Given its long degradation time, carotane acts as an important biomarker Given how long it is preserved. It remains best in sediment and oil environments where it can last years. Beta-carotane, in specific, acts as a biomarker for saline and low lacustrine environments. This means carotane can be used as a biomarker to identify previous water-based habitats.

=== Barney Creek ===
The Barney Creek Study was set up to determine why deep levels of carotane did not exist in the Barney Creek Formation. The two guesses as to the reason were that it was a biological phenomenon within the species or that the species had just degraded. Using chromatography with He as a carrier gas, degradation was visible in the samples. There was found to be a presence of beta and gamma carotane derivatives. The derivatives were cross-referenced with synthesized derivatives that were produced via the catagenesis of beta carotene through hydrous pyrolysis.
