= Lycopene (data page) =

Chemical data page

This page provides supplementary chemical data on lycopene.

== Material Safety Data Sheet ==
The handling of this chemical may incur notable safety precautions. It is highly recommend that you seek the Material Safety Datasheet (MSDS) for this chemical from a reliable source and follow its directions.

== Structure and properties ==
All-trans-lycopene with canonical numbering:

Several common geometric isomers of lycopene. In total, there are 72 possible isomers of lycopene (sterically hindered isomers not included).

Structure and properties
| Index of refraction, n_{D} | ? |
| Dielectric constant, ε_{r} | ? ε_{0} at ? °C |
| Bond strength | ? |
| Bond length | ? |
| Bond angle | ? |
| Magnetic susceptibility | ? |

== Spectral data ==
To date, no X-ray crystal structure of lycopene has been reported.

UV spectra of lycopene in hexane. A typical carotenoid, lycopene displays three absorbance maxima. A peak at 360 nm would indicate the presence of certain cis-isomers

UV-Vis
| λ_{max} | 443, 471, 502 nm in hexane |
| Extinction coefficient, ε | 1.72 × 10^{5} L•mol^{−1}•cm^{−1}(at 502 nm) |
IR
| Major absorption bands | ? cm^{−1} |
NMR
| Proton NMR |
| Carbon-13 NMR |
| Other NMR data |
MS
| Masses of main fragments |

This box:
- Except where noted otherwise, data relate to Standard temperature and pressure.
- Reliability of data general note.
