= Terpenoid =

Class of aromatic organic chemicals found in plants

Terpenoids, also known as isoprenoids, are a class of naturally occurring organic chemicals derived from the 5-carbon compound isoprene and its derivatives called terpenes, diterpenes, etc. While sometimes used interchangeably with "terpenes", terpenoids contain additional functional groups, usually containing oxygen. When combined with the hydrocarbon terpenes, terpenoids comprise about 80,000 compounds. They are the largest class of plant secondary metabolites, representing about 60% of known natural products. Many terpenoids have substantial pharmacological bioactivity and are therefore of interest to medicinal chemists.

Plant terpenoids are used for their aromatic qualities and play a role in traditional herbal remedies. Terpenoids contribute to the scent of eucalyptus, the flavors of cinnamon, cloves, and ginger, the yellow color in sunflowers, and the red color in tomatoes. Well-known terpenoids include citral, menthol, camphor, salvinorin A in the plant Salvia divinorum, ginkgolide and bilobalide found in Ginkgo biloba and the phytocannabinoids found in plants such as cannabis. The provitamin β-carotene (beta-carotene) is a terpene derivative called a carotenoid.

The steroids and sterols in animals are biologically produced from terpenoid precursors. Sometimes terpenoids are added to proteins, e.g., to enhance their attachment to the cell membrane; this is known as isoprenylation. Terpenoids play a role in plant defense as prophylaxis against pathogens and attractants for the predators of herbivores.

== Structure and classification ==
Terpenoids are modified terpenes, wherein methyl groups have been moved or removed, or oxygen atoms added. Some authors use the term "terpene" more broadly, to include the terpenoids. Just like terpenes, the terpenoids can be classified according to the number of isoprene units that comprise the parent terpene:

Terpenoids	Analogue terpenes	Number of isoprene units	Number of carbon atoms	General formula	Examples
Hemiterpenoids	Isoprene	1	5	C_{5}H_{8}	DMAPP, isopentenyl pyrophosphate, isoprenol, isovaleramide, isovaleric acid, HMBPP, prenol
Monoterpenoids	Monoterpenes	2	10	C_{10}H_{16}	Bornyl acetate, camphor, carvone, citral, citronellal, citronellol, geraniol, eucalyptol, hinokitiol, iridoids, linalool, menthol, thymol
Sesquiterpenoids	Sesquiterpenes	3	15	C_{15}H_{24}	Farnesol, geosmin, humulone
Diterpenoids	Diterpenes	4	20	C_{20}H_{32}	Abietic acid, ginkgolides, paclitaxel, retinol, salvinorin A, sclareol, steviol
Sesterterpenoids	Sesterterpenes	5	25	C_{25}H_{40}	Andrastin A, manoalide
Triterpenoids	Triterpenes	6	30	C_{30}H_{48}	Amyrin, betulinic acid, limonoids, oleanolic acid, sterols, squalene, ursolic acid
Tetraterpenoids	Tetraterpenes	8	40	C_{40}H_{64}	Carotenoids
Polyterpenoid	Polyterpenes	>8	>40	(C_{5}H_{8})_{n}	Gutta-percha, natural rubber

Terpenoids can also be classified according to the type and number of cyclic structures they contain: linear, acyclic, monocyclic, bicyclic, tricyclic, tetracyclic, pentacyclic, or macrocyclic. The Salkowski test can be used to identify the presence of terpenoids.

Selected terpenoids

Paclitaxel is a diterpenoid anticancer drug.

Terpineols are monoterpenoids.

Humulones are classified as sesquiterpenoids.

Retinol is a diterpenoid.

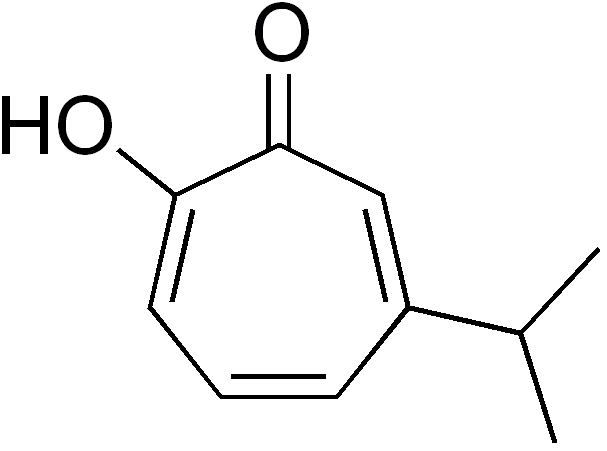
Hinokitiol is a monoterpenoid, a tropolone derivative.

Limonin, a common limonoid, is a triterpenoid.

Geosmin is a sesquiterpenoid.

== Biosynthesis ==
Terpenoids, at least those containing an alcohol functional group, often arise by hydrolysis of carbocationic intermediates produced from geranyl pyrophosphate. Analogously hydrolysis of intermediates from farnesyl pyrophosphate gives sesquiterpenoids, and hydrolysis of intermediates from geranylgeranyl pyrophosphate gives diterpenoids, etc.

== Impact on aerosols ==
In air, terpenoids are converted into various species, such as aldehydes, hydroperoxides, organic nitrates, and epoxides by short-lived free radicals (like the hydroxyl radical) and to a lesser extent by ozone. These new species can dissolve into water droplets and contribute to aerosol and haze formation. Secondary organic aerosols formed from this pathway may have atmospheric impacts.

As an example the Blue Ridge Mountains in the U.S. and Blue Mountains of New South Wales in Australia are noted for having a bluish color when seen from a distance. Trees put the "blue" in Blue Ridge, from their terpenoids released into the atmosphere.

== See also ==
- List of antioxidants in food
- List of phytochemicals in food
- Nutrition
- Phytochemistry
- Secondary metabolites
