= Prenol =

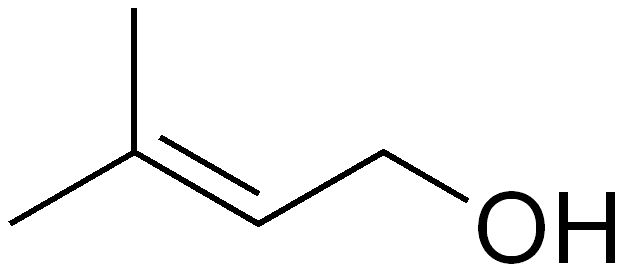
- Skeletal formula of prenol

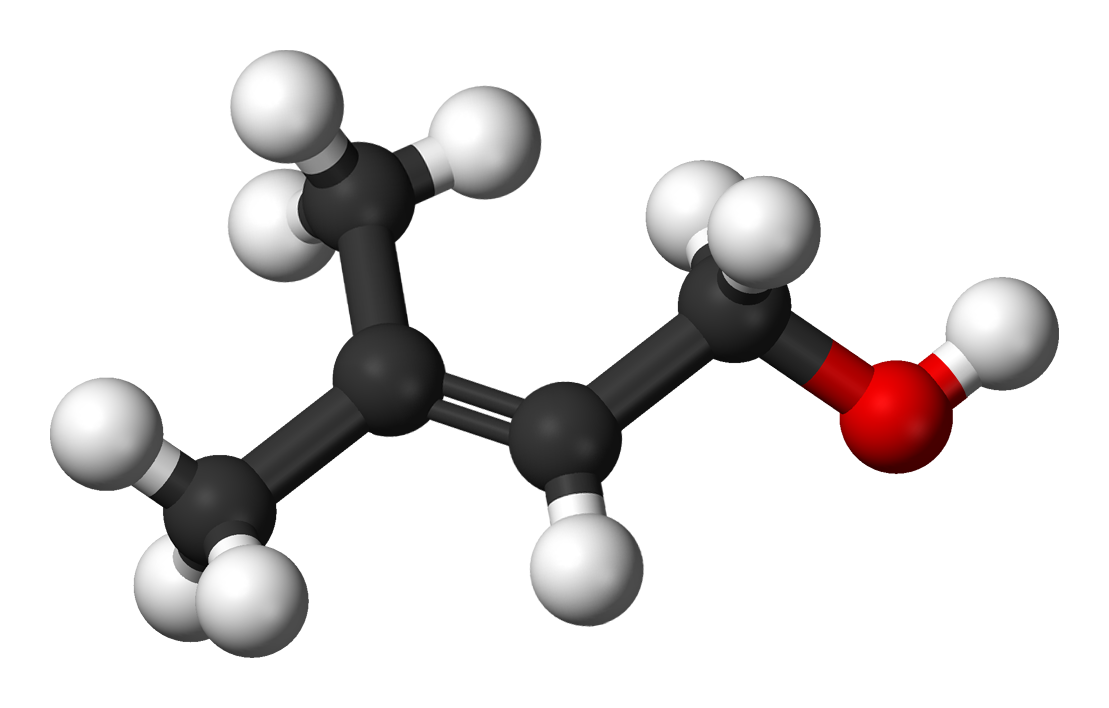
- Ball-and-stick model

Names
- Preferred IUPAC name 3-Methylbut-2-en-1-ol
- Other names 3,3-Dimethylallyl alcohol

Identifiers
CAS Number	556-82-1
3D model (JSmol)	Interactive image
ChEBI	CHEBI:16019
ChemSpider	10700
ECHA InfoCard	100.008.312
EC Number	209-141-4
PubChem CID	11173
UNII	55MY0HM445
CompTox Dashboard (EPA)	DTXSID2027206
- InChI: InChI=1S/C5H10O/c1-5(2)3-4-6/h3,6H,4H2,1-2H3 Key: ASUAYTHWZCLXAN-UHFFFAOYSA-N; InChI=1/C5H10O/c1-5(2)3-4-6/h3,6H,4H2,1-2H3
- SMILES: OC\C=C(/C)C

Properties
Chemical formula	C_{5}H_{10}O
Molar mass	86.132 g/mol
Density	0.848 g/cm^{3}
Melting point	−59 °C (−74 °F; 214 K) (calculated)
Boiling point	142 °C (288 °F; 415 K) (approximation)
Solubility in water	17 g/100 ml (20 °C)
log P	0.91
Vapor pressure	3.17 hPa (25 °C, extrapolated)

Hazards
- GHS labelling
Pictograms	
Signal word	Warning
Hazard statements	H226, H302
Precautionary statements	P210, P233, P240, P241, P242, P243, P264, P270, P301+P312, P303+P361+P353, P330, P370+P378, P403+P235, P501
Flash point	43.3 °C (109.9 °F; 316.4 K) (Note: BASF gives a value for the flash point of prenol of 51.5 °C (125 °F), which is used in the OECD Screening Information Data Set (SIDS): the difference in the two values does not alter the safety classification of prenol as a category 3 flammable liquid (GHS) or class II combustible liquid (U.S., 29 C.F.R § 1910.106, NFPA class F2).)
- Except where otherwise noted, data are given for materials in their standard state (at 25 °C [77 °F], 100 kPa). verify (what is ?) Infobox references

Prenol, or 3-methyl-2-buten-1-ol, is a natural alcohol. It is one of the simplest terpenoids. It occurs naturally in citrus fruits, cranberry, bilberry, currants, grapes, raspberry, blackberry, tomato, white bread, hop oil, coffee, arctic bramble, cloudberry and passion fruit. It is a clear colorless oil that is reasonably soluble in water and miscible with most common organic solvents.

Prenol has a fruity odor and is used occasionally in perfumery. It is also manufactured industrially by BASF (in Ludwigshafen, Germany) and by Kuraray (in Asia) as an intermediate to pharmaceuticals and aroma compounds. Global production in 2001 was between 6000 and 13,000 tons.

== Industrial production ==
Prenol is produced industrially by the reaction of formaldehyde with isobutene, followed by the isomerization of the resulting isoprenol (3-methyl-3-buten-1-ol).

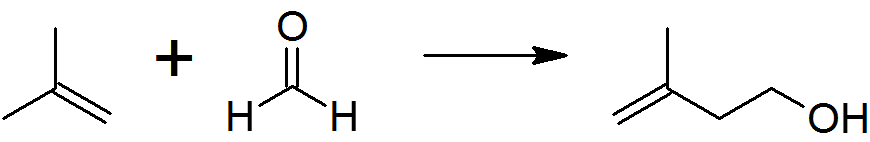
The reaction of isobutene with formaldehyde to give isoprenol, the first step in the industrial manufacture of prenol

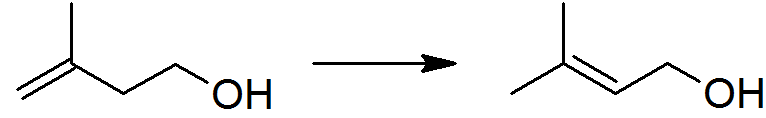
The isomerization of isoprenol to prenol, the second step in the industrial manufacture of prenol

== Uses ==
Prenol is mainly used as a precursor to citral, an intermediate in the industrial production of vitamin A, E, and K. For this purpose, prenol is oxidized to the aldehyde prenal.

=== Polyprenols ===
Prenol is a building block of isoprenoid alcohols, which have the general formula:

H–[CH_{2}CCH_{3}=CHCH_{2}]_{n}–OH

The repeating C_{5}H_{8} moiety in the brackets is called isoprene, and these compounds are sometimes called 'isoprenols'. They should not be confused with isoprenol, which is an isomer of prenol with a terminal double bond. The simplest isoprenoid alcohol is geraniol (n = 2): higher oligomers include farnesol (n = 3) and geranylgeraniol (n = 4).

When the isoprene unit attached to the alcohol is saturated, the compound is referred to as a dolichol. Dolichols are important as glycosyl carriers in the synthesis of polysaccharides. They also play a major role in protecting cellular membranes, stabilising cell proteins and supporting the body's immune system.

Prenol is polymerized by dehydration reactions; when there are at least five isoprene units (n in the above formula is greater than or equal to five), the polymer is called a polyprenol. Polyprenols can contain up to 100 isoprene units (n = 100) linked end to end with the hydroxyl group (–OH) remaining at the end. These long-chain isoprenoid alcohols are also called 'terpenols'. They are important in the acylation of proteins, carotenoids, and fat-soluble vitamins A, E and K.

Polyprenols also play a vital role in cell metabolism. Research indicates that ingested polyprenols are metabolised by human and animal liver into dolichols which then take part in the dolichol phosphate cycle and are therefore easily assimilated by humans and animals. The pharmacological activity of polyprenols is based on their substitutive effect in the case of dolichol deficits which are observed with chronic inflammatory, degenerative and oncological diseases.

Live conifer needles are one of the richest and most widely available sources for polyprenol extraction in the world. Commercial extraction of polyprenols involves a soft extraction procedure that enables them to be extracted without destroying their biological activity.
