= Shortolide A =

Names
- Preferred IUPAC name (1aR,3aS,4S,5S,6S,7aR)-4,5,7a,7b-Tetramethyl-4-[2-(5-oxo-2,5-dihydrofuran-3-yl)ethyl]-decahydrooxireno[2,3-a]naphthalen-6-yl (2Z)-2-methylbut-2-enoate

Identifiers
CAS Number	34331-31-2
3D model (JSmol)	Interactive image
ChemSpider	34216765
PubChem CID	102341086
UNII	3UD72E6T3Z
- InChI: InChI=1S/C25H36O5/c1-7-15(2)22(27)29-18-13-24(5)19(8-9-20-25(24,6)30-20)23(4,16(18)3)11-10-17-12-21(26)28-14-17/h7,12,16,18-20H,8-11,13-14H2,1-6H3/b15-7-/t16-,18+,19+,20-,23-,24-,25-/m1/s1 Key: URRSOXWGRAMYOW-GACOYEMDSA-N
- SMILES: [H][C@@]12CC[C@H]3O[C@@]3(C)[C@]1(C)C[C@H](OC(=O)C(\C)=C/C)[C@@H](C)[C@@]2(C)CCC1=CC(=O)OC1

Properties
Chemical formula	C_{25}H_{36}O_{5}
Molar mass	416.558 g·mol^{−1}
- Except where otherwise noted, data are given for materials in their standard state (at 25 °C [77 °F], 100 kPa). Infobox references

Shortolide A is a natural product isolated from Solidago shortii. S. shortii is an endangered species native to the United States. Shortolide A is one of six diterpenes isolated from the species Solidago shortii. Three of these products are hydrolysis products. Solidago is common across North America but Solidago shortii is only found in a limited area where only 14 wild populations are known. Because of this, the species was designated as endangered.

== Spectroscopic elucidation ==
Shorotolide A is a colorless solid and is optically active. According to mass spectrometry and NMR the chemical formula is C_{25}H_{36}O_{5}. ROESY correlations were used to determine the relative configuration. The absolute configuration was determined the comparison of calculated and experimental vibrational circular dichroism. Comparisons of calculated and experimental optical rotation was also used.

== Proposed Synthesis ==
A proposed synthesis is shown below.

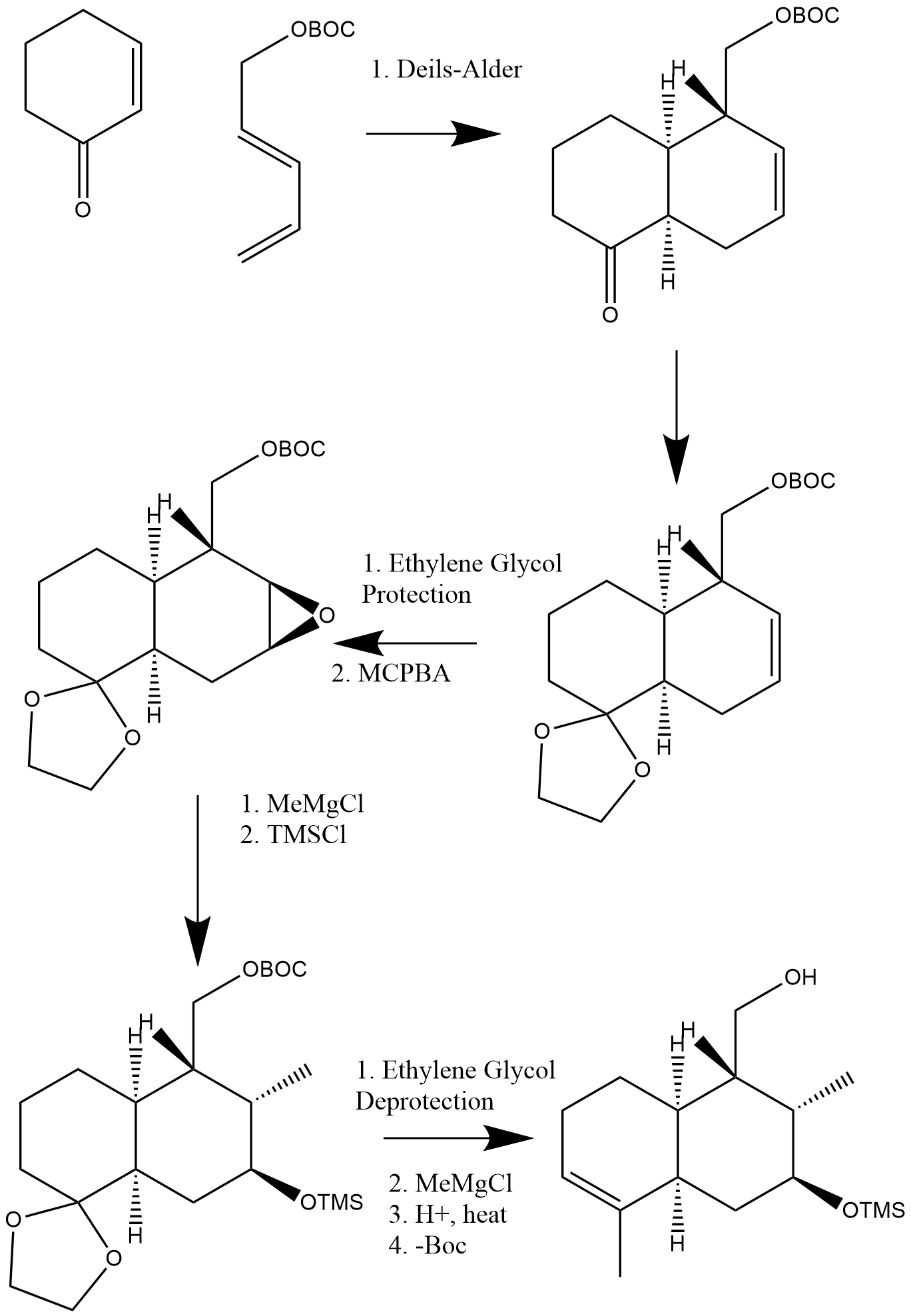
Shortolide A Proposed synthesis Scheme 1

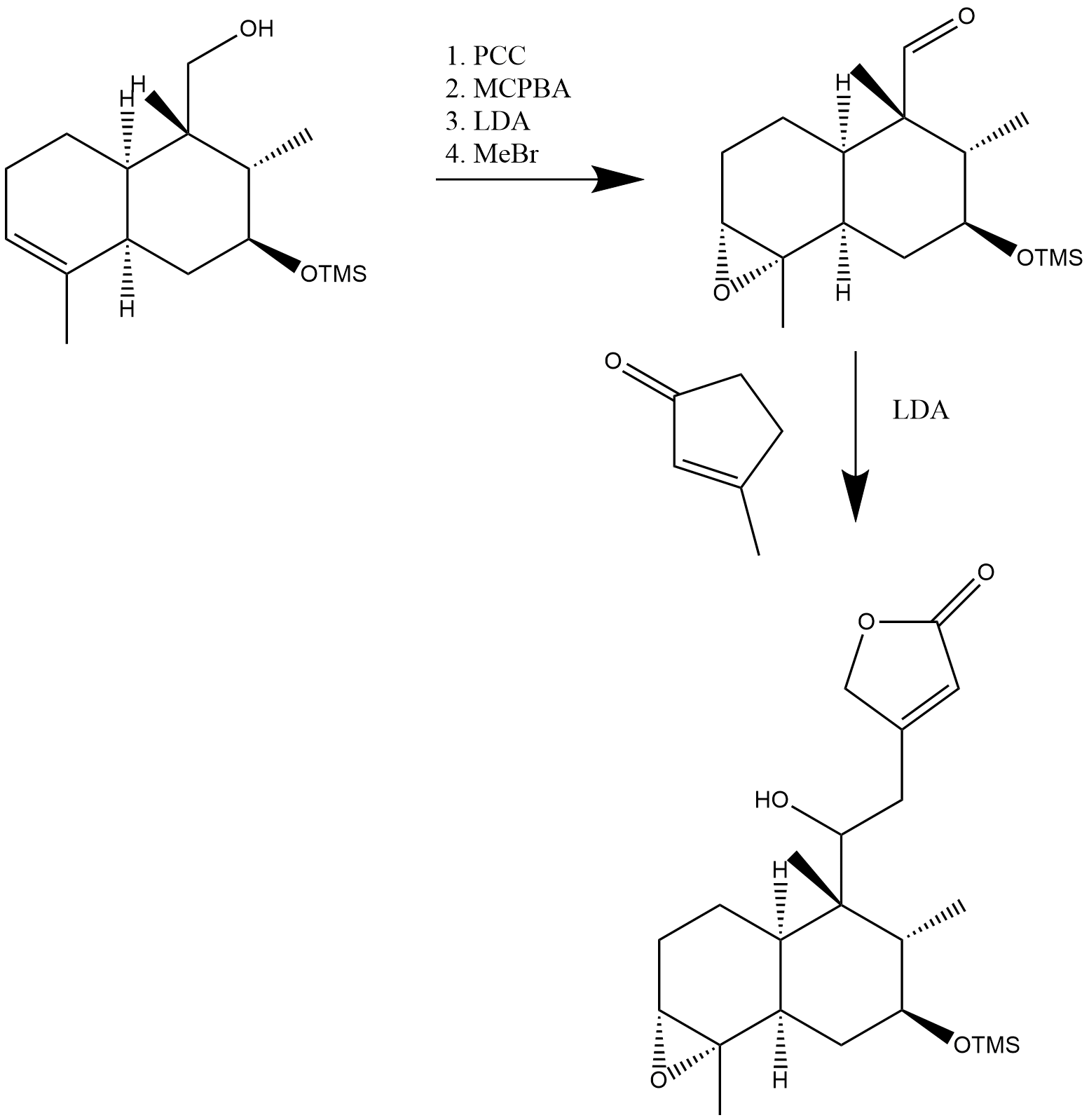
Shortolide A Proposed synthesis Scheme 2

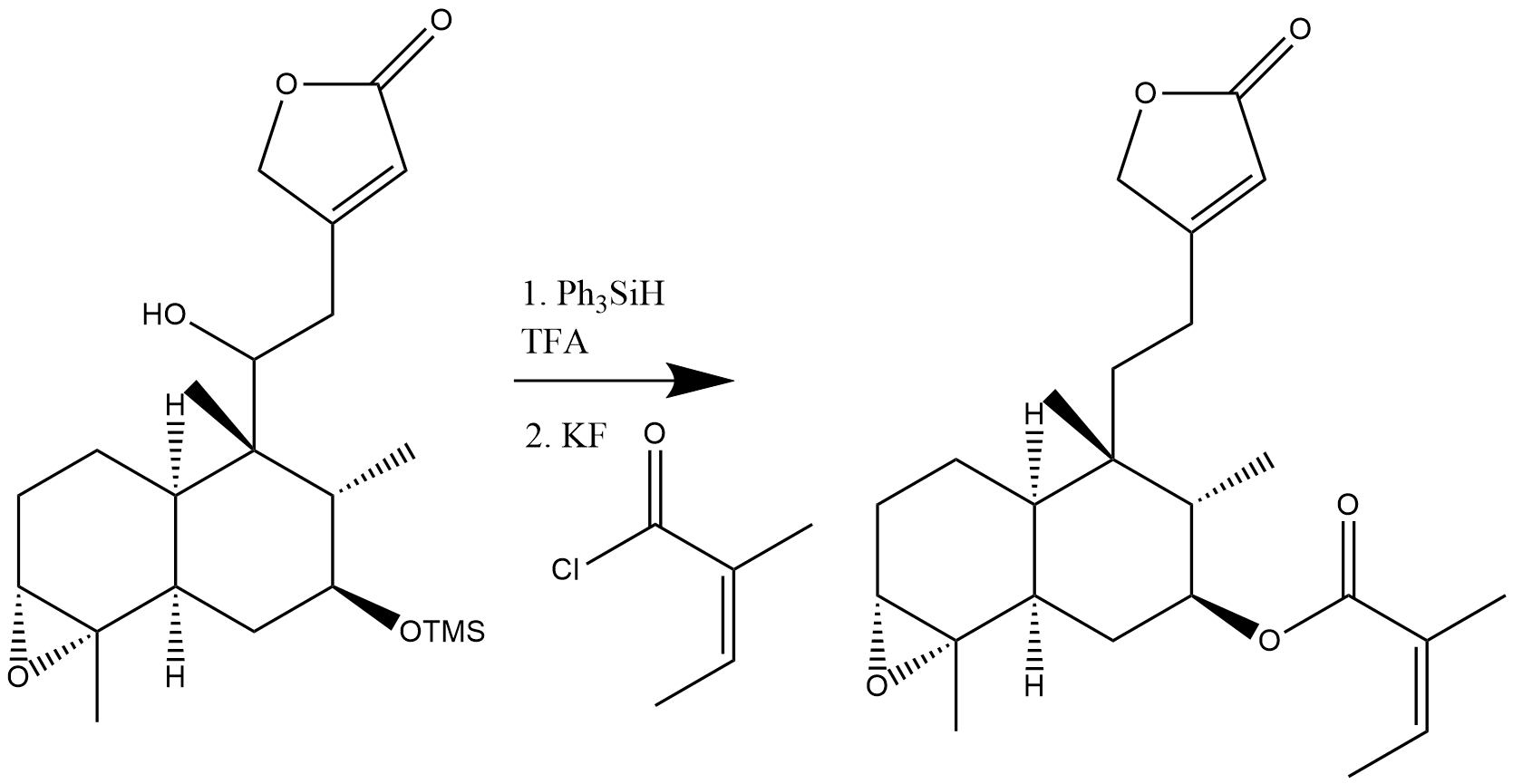
Shortolide A Proposed synthesis Scheme 3
