= Isovaleraldehyde =

Names
- Preferred IUPAC name 3-Methylbutanal
- Other names Isovaleral, Isovaleric Aldehyde

Identifiers
CAS Number	590-86-3
3D model (JSmol)	Interactive image
ChEBI	CHEBI:16638
ChemSpider	11065
ECHA InfoCard	100.008.811
PubChem CID	11552
UNII	69931RWI96
CompTox Dashboard (EPA)	DTXSID1021619
- InChI: InChI=1S/C5H10O/c1-5(2)3-4-6/h4-5H,3H2,1-2H3 Key: YGHRJJRRZDOVPD-UHFFFAOYSA-N; InChI=1/C5H10O/c1-5(2)3-4-6/h4-5H,3H2,1-2H3 Key: YGHRJJRRZDOVPD-UHFFFAOYAE
- SMILES: CC(C)CC=O

Properties
Chemical formula	C_{5}H_{10}O
Molar mass	86.134 g·mol^{−1}
Appearance	Colorless Liquid
Density	0.785 g/mL at 20 °C
Melting point	−51 °C (−60 °F; 222 K)
Boiling point	92 °C (198 °F; 365 K)
Solubility in water	Soluble in alcohol and ether, slightly soluble in water
Magnetic susceptibility (χ)	−57.5×10^{−6} cm^{3}/mol

Hazards
- Occupational safety and health (OHS/OSH)
Main hazards	Combustible
- Except where otherwise noted, data are given for materials in their standard state (at 25 °C [77 °F], 100 kPa). Infobox references

Isovaleraldehyde organic compound, also known as 3-methylbutanal, with the formula (CH_{3})_{2}CHCH_{2}CHO. It is an aldehyde, a colorless liquid at STP, and found in low concentrations in many types of food. Commercially it is used as a reagent for the production of pharmaceuticals, perfumes and pesticides.

== Synthesis ==
Synthetic routes for the production of isovaleraldehyde vary. One method is by the hydroformylation of isobutene:

(CH_{3})_{2}C=CH_{2} + H_{2} + CO → (CH_{3})_{2}CH−CH_{2}CHO

A small amount of 2,2-dimethylpropanal ((CH_{3})_{2}C(CHO)CH_{3}) side product is also generated.

Another method of production involves the isomerization of isoprenol using CuO–ZnO as a catalyst. A mixture of isoprenol and prenol may also be used. These starting materials are obtained from a reaction between isobutene and formaldehyde:

CH_{3}CH_{3}CCH_{2} + CH_{2}O → (CH_{3})_{2}CHCH_{2}CHO

Finally, in beer the compound is produced via a reaction between the amino acid leucine and reductones in the malt.

== Occurrences and uses ==
As it can be derived from leucine, the occurrence of isovaleraldehyde is not limited to beer. The compound has found to be a flavor component in many different types of foods. It is described as having a malty flavor and has been found in cheese, coffee, chicken, fish, chocolate, olive oil, and tea.

The compound is used as a reactant in the synthesis of a number of compounds. Notably it is used to synthesize tetramethylethylene, and is then converted to pinacol and pinacolone. Pinacolone itself is then used in synthesis for number of pesticides. Additionally, a range of pharmaceuticals, such as butizide, are synthesized from isovaleraldehyde and its corresponding acid. It is a common reagent or building block in organic synthesis.

2,4,6-Triisobutyl-1,3,5-trioxane

Acid-catalyzed cyclic trimerization of Isovaleraldehyde gives 2,4,6-Triisobutyl-1,3,5-trioxane [68165-40-2]. This is a flavouring agent that can be used in confectionary, tobacco, and other foodstuffs, toothpastes and the like. It is described as imparting a creamy, dairy, vanilla chocolate and berry flavour.

According to IFF, isovaleraldehyde is used as a food flavorant additive.
