= Manoalide =

Names
- Preferred IUPAC name (5R)-5-Hydroxy-4-{(2R,6R)-6-hydroxy-5-[(3E)-4-methyl-6-(2,6,6-trimethylcyclohex-1-en-1-yl)hex-3-en-1-yl]-3,6-dihydro-2H-pyran-2-yl}furan-2(5H)-one

Identifiers
CAS Number	75088-80-1
3D model (JSmol)	Interactive image
ChEBI	CHEBI:66666
ChEMBL	ChEMBL463914
ChemSpider	4941932
KEGG	C17156
PubChem CID	6437368
UNII	E1DK0157K9
CompTox Dashboard (EPA)	DTXSID401028174
- InChI: InChI=1S/C25H36O5/c1-16(10-12-20-17(2)8-6-14-25(20,3)4)7-5-9-18-11-13-21(29-23(18)27)19-15-22(26)30-24(19)28/h7,11,15,21,23-24,27-28H,5-6,8-10,12-14H2,1-4H3/b16-7+/t21-,23-,24-/m1/s1 Key: FGJIDQWRRLDGDB-CPIXEKRISA-N; InChI=1/C25H36O5/c1-16(10-12-20-17(2)8-6-14-25(20,3)4)7-5-9-18-11-13-21(29-23(18)27)19-15-22(26)30-24(19)28/h7,11,15,21,23-24,27-28H,5-6,8-10,12-14H2,1-4H3/b16-7+/t21-,23-,24-/m1/s1 Key: FGJIDQWRRLDGDB-CPIXEKRIBK
- SMILES: CC1=C(C(CCC1)(C)C)CC/C(=C/CCC2=CC[C@@H](O[C@H]2O)C3=CC(=O)O[C@H]3O)/C

Properties
Chemical formula	C_{25}H_{36}O_{5}
Molar mass	416.55034
- Except where otherwise noted, data are given for materials in their standard state (at 25 °C [77 °F], 100 kPa). verify (what is ?) Infobox references

Manoalide is a calcium channel blocker. It has antibiotic, analgesic and anti-inflammatory effects and is found in some sponges, including the West Pacific species Luffariella variabilis. Its functions are made possible by the permanent blockage of phospholipase A2 and C with lysine residues. This could be made possible through the functional groups incorporated in gamma-hydroxybutenolide, alpha-hydroxydihydropyran and the trimethylcyclohexenyl. The gamma-hydroxybutenolide ring is present in the reaction between manoalide and phospholipase A2, the hemiacetal in alpha-hydroxydihydropyran is needed for permanent binding and hydrophobic trimethylcyclohexenyl ring makes it possible for non-bonded interactions to interact between manoalide and phospholipase A2 to strengthen the reaction. Due to its potential of permanent inhibition, it was made possible for it to take part in oral cancer and hepatitis C research.
