= Isoprene =

Bio-organic compound that serves as the building unit of terpenes

Full structural formula of isoprene
Skeletal formula of isoprene
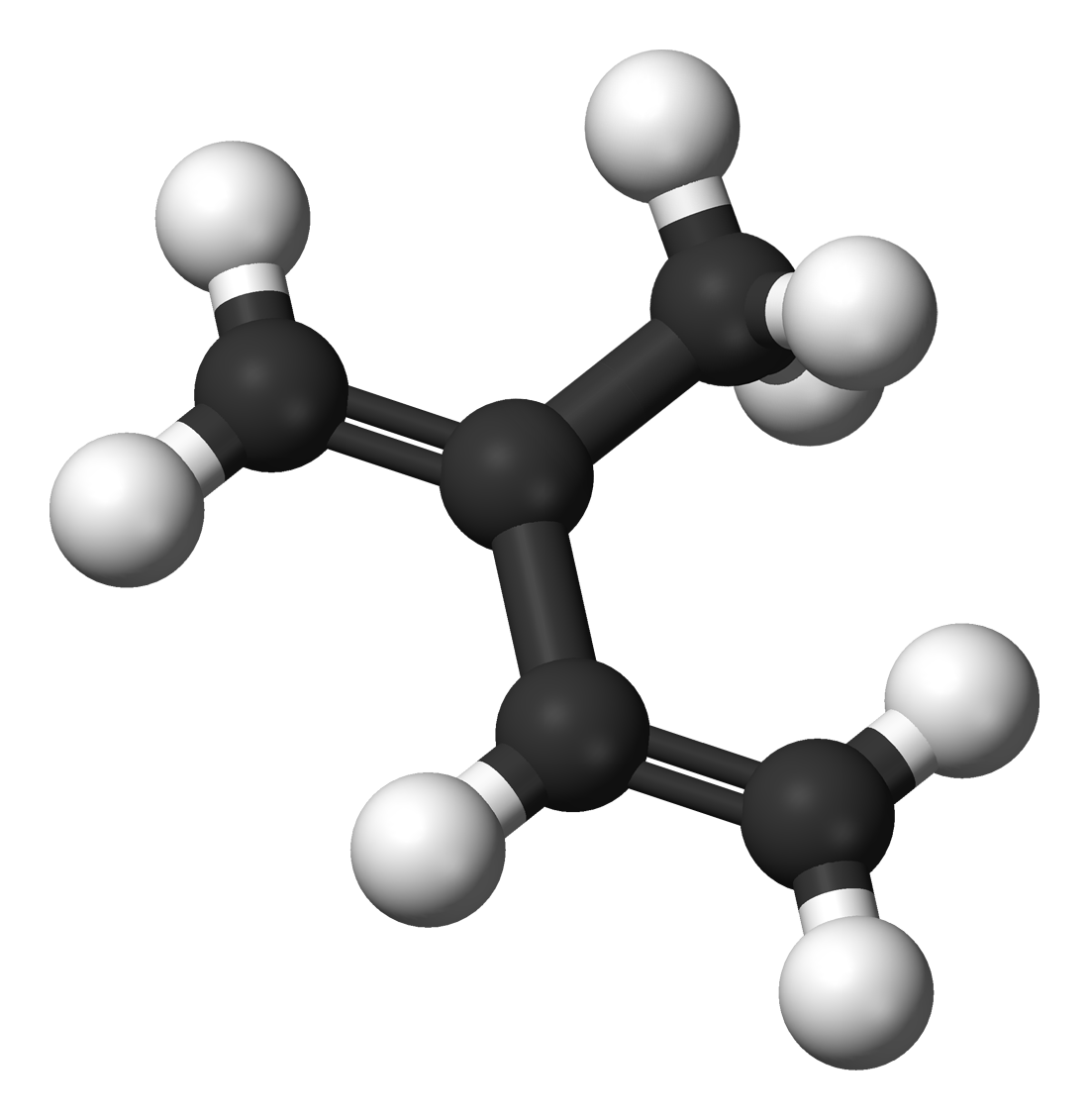
Ball-and-stick model of isoprene
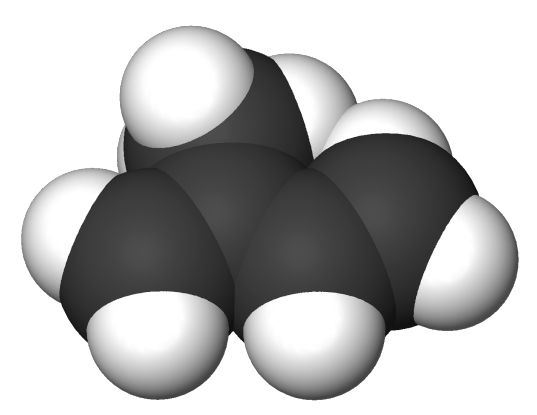
Space-filling model of isoprene

Names
- IUPAC name Isoprene
- Preferred IUPAC name 2-Methylbuta-1,3-diene
- Other names 2-Methyl-1,3-butadiene

Identifiers
CAS Number	78-79-5
3D model (JSmol)	Interactive image
ChEBI	CHEBI:35194
ChemSpider	6309
ECHA InfoCard	100.001.040
KEGG	C16521
PubChem CID	6557
UNII	0A62964IBU
CompTox Dashboard (EPA)	DTXSID2020761
- InChI: InChI=1S/C5H8/c1-4-5(2)3/h4H,1-2H2,3H3 Key: RRHGJUQNOFWUDK-UHFFFAOYSA-N; InChI=1/C5H8/c1-4-5(2)3/h4H,1-2H2,3H3 Key: RRHGJUQNOFWUDK-UHFFFAOYAS
- SMILES: CC(=C)C=C

Properties
Chemical formula	C_{5}H_{8}
Molar mass	68.12 g/mol
Density	0.681 g/cm^{3}
Melting point	−143.95 °C (−227.11 °F; 129.20 K)
Boiling point	34.067 °C (93.321 °F; 307.217 K)
- Except where otherwise noted, data are given for materials in their standard state (at 25 °C [77 °F], 100 kPa). verify (what is ?) Infobox references

Isoprene, or 2-methyl-1,3-butadiene, is a common volatile organic compound with the formula CH_{2}=C(CH_{3})−CH=CH_{2}. In its pure form it is a colorless volatile liquid. It is produced by many plants and animals (including humans) and its polymers are the main component of natural rubber.

== History and etymology ==
Charles Greville Williams named the compound in 1860 after obtaining it from the pyrolysis of natural rubber. He correctly deduced the mass shares of carbon and hydrogen (but arrived at an incorrect formula C_{10}H_{8} because the modern atomic weight of carbon was not adopted until the Karlsruhe Congress held later that year). He did not specify the reasons for the name, but it is hypothesized that it came from "propylene" with which isoprene shares some physical and chemical properties. The first one to observe recombination of isoprene into rubber-like substance was Gustave Bouchardat in 1879, and William A. Tilden identified its structure five years later.

== Natural occurrences ==
Dimethylallyl pyrophosphate, not isoprene itself, is the source of most terpenes.

Isoprene is produced and emitted by many species of trees (major producers are oaks, poplars, eucalyptus, phytoplankton, and some legumes). Yearly production of isoprene emissions by vegetation is around 600 million metric tons, half from tropical broadleaf trees and the remainder primarily from shrubs. This is about equivalent to methane emissions and accounts for around one-third of all hydrocarbons released into the atmosphere. In deciduous forests, isoprene makes up approximately 80% of hydrocarbon emissions. While their contribution is small compared to trees, microscopic and macroscopic algae also produce isoprene.

=== Plants ===
Isoprene is made through the methyl-erythritol 4-phosphate pathway (MEP pathway, also called the non-mevalonate pathway) in the chloroplasts of plants. One of the two end-products of MEP pathway, dimethylallyl pyrophosphate (DMAPP), is cleaved by the enzyme isoprene synthase to form isoprene and diphosphate. Therefore, inhibitors that block the MEP pathway, such as fosmidomycin, also block isoprene formation. Isoprene emission increases dramatically with temperature and maximizes at around 40 °C. This has led to the hypothesis that isoprene may protect plants against heat stress (thermotolerance hypothesis, see below). Emission of isoprene is also observed in some bacteria and this is thought to come from non-enzymatic degradations from DMAPP. Global emission of isoprene by plants is estimated at around 350 million tons per year.

==== Regulation ====
Isoprene emission in plants is controlled both by the availability of the substrate (DMAPP) and by enzyme (isoprene synthase) activity. In particular, light, CO_{2} and O_{2} dependencies of isoprene emission are controlled by substrate availability, whereas temperature dependency of isoprene emission is regulated both by substrate level and enzyme activity.

=== In humans and other organisms ===
Isoprene is the most abundant hydrocarbon measurable in the breath of humans. The estimated production rate of isoprene in the human body is 0.15 μmol/(kg·h), equivalent to approximately 17 mg/day for a person weighing 70 kg. Human breath isoprene originates from lipolytic cholesterol metabolism within the skeletal muscular peroxisomes and IDI2 gene acts as the production determinant. Due to the absence of IDI2 gene, animals such as pigs and bottle-nose dolphins do not exhale isoprene.

Isoprene is common in low concentrations in many foods. Many species of soil and marine bacteria, such as Actinomycetota, are capable of degrading isoprene and using it as a fuel source.

Chemical structure of cis-polyisoprene, the main constituent of natural rubber

== Biological roles ==
Isoprene emission appears to be a mechanism that trees use to combat abiotic stresses. In particular, isoprene has been shown to protect against moderate heat stress (around 40 °C). It may also protect plants against large fluctuations in leaf temperature. Isoprene is incorporated into and helps stabilize cell membranes in response to heat stress.

Isoprene also confers resistance to reactive oxygen species. The amount of isoprene released from isoprene-emitting vegetation depends on leaf mass, leaf area, light (particularly photosynthetic photon flux density, or PPFD) and leaf temperature. Thus, during the night, little isoprene is emitted from tree leaves, whereas daytime emissions are expected to be substantial during hot and sunny days, up to 25 μg/(g dry-leaf-weight)/hour in many oak species.

=== Isoprenoids ===
The isoprene skeleton can be found in naturally occurring compounds called terpenes and terpenoid (oxygenated terpenes), collectively called isoprenoids. These compounds do not arise from isoprene itself. Instead, the precursor to isoprene units in biological systems is dimethylallyl pyrophosphate (DMAPP) and its isomer isopentenyl pyrophosphate (IPP). The plural 'isoprenes' is sometimes used to refer to terpenes in general.

Examples of isoprenoids include carotene, phytol, retinol (vitamin A), tocopherol (vitamin E), dolichols, and squalene. Heme A has an isoprenoid tail, and lanosterol, the sterol precursor in animals, is derived from squalene and hence from isoprene. The functional isoprene units in biological systems are dimethylallyl pyrophosphate (DMAPP) and its isomer isopentenyl pyrophosphate (IPP), which are used in the biosynthesis of naturally occurring isoprenoids such as carotenoids, quinones, lanosterol derivatives (e.g. steroids) and the prenyl chains of certain compounds (e.g. phytol chain of chlorophyll). Isoprenes are used in the cell membrane monolayer of many Archaea, filling the space between the diglycerol tetraether head groups. This is thought to add structural resistance to harsh environments in which many Archaea are found.

Similarly, natural rubber is composed of linear polyisoprene chains of very high molecular weight and other natural molecules.

Simplified version of the steroid synthesis pathway with the intermediates isopentenyl pyrophosphate (IPP), dimethylallyl pyrophosphate (DMAPP), geranyl pyrophosphate (GPP) and squalene shown. Some intermediates are omitted.

== Industrial production ==
Isoprene is most readily available industrially as a byproduct of the thermal cracking of petroleum naphtha or oil, as a side product in the production of ethylene. Where thermal cracking of oil is less common, isoprene can be produced by dehydrogenation of isopentane. Isoprene can be synthesized in two steps from isobutylene, starting with a Prins reaction with formaldehyde to give isoprenol, which is then dehydrated to isoprene:

Production of isoprene from isobutene via ene reaction

Where cheap acetylene is produced from coal-derived calcium carbide, it may be combined with acetone to make 3-methylbutynol which is then hydrogenated and dehydrated to isoprene.

About 800,000 metric tons are produced annually. About 95% of isoprene production is used to produce cis-1,4-polyisoprene—a synthetic version of natural rubber.

Natural rubber consists mainly of poly-cis-isoprene with a molecular mass of 100,000 to 1,000,000 g/mol. Typically natural rubber contains a few percent of other materials, such as proteins, fatty acids, resins, and inorganic materials. Some natural rubber sources, called gutta percha, are composed of trans-1,4-polyisoprene, a structural isomer that has similar, but not identical, properties.

== See also ==
- Natural rubber
- Neoprene
