= Isoprenol =

- Structural formula of isoprenol

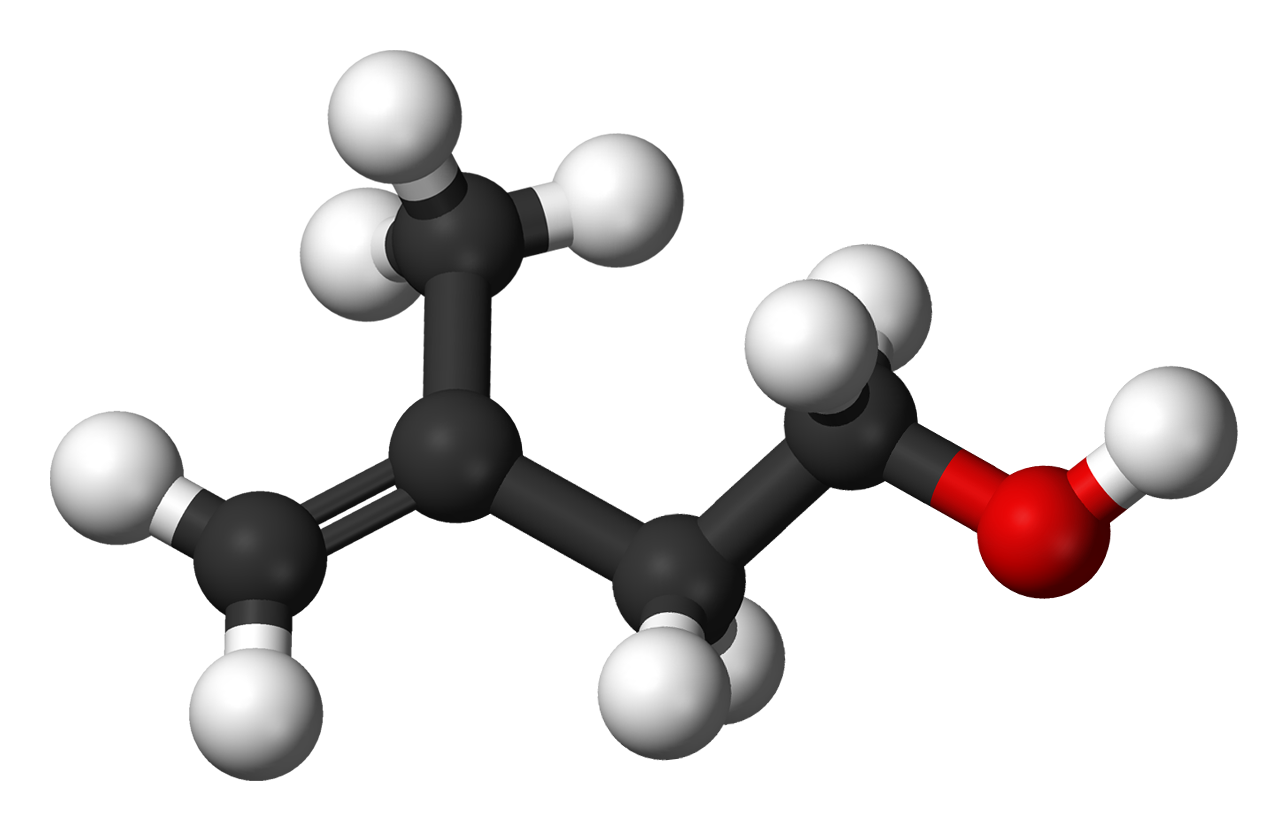
- Ball-and-stick model of prenol

Names
- Preferred IUPAC name 3-Methylbut-3-en-1-ol
- Other names 3-Methyl-3-buten-1-ol

Identifiers
CAS Number	763-32-6
3D model (JSmol)	Interactive image
ChEBI	CHEBI:62898
ChEMBL	ChEMBL3561140
ChemSpider	12448
ECHA InfoCard	100.011.009
EC Number	212-110-8
PubChem CID	12988
UNII	KJ25C8CPFA
CompTox Dashboard (EPA)	DTXSID4052506
- InChI: InChI=1S/C5H10O/c1-5(2)3-4-6/h6H,1,3-4H2,2H3 Key: CPJRRXSHAYUTGL-UHFFFAOYSA-N; InChI=1/C5H10O/c1-5(2)3-4-6/h6H,1,3-4H2,2H3
- SMILES: OCCC(=C)C

Properties
Chemical formula	C_{5}H_{10}O
Molar mass	86.132 g/mol
Density	0.853 g/cm^{3}
Boiling point	130 to 132 °C (266 to 270 °F; 403 to 405 K)
Refractive index (n_{D})	1.433

Hazards
- GHS labelling
Pictograms	
Signal word	Warning
Hazard statements	H226, H319
Precautionary statements	P210, P233, P240, P241, P242, P243, P264, P280, P303+P361+P353, P305+P351+P338, P337+P313, P370+P378, P403+P235, P501
Flash point	36 °C (97 °F; 309 K) (Note: Sigma-Aldrich Co. gives a value for the flash point of isoprenol of 42 °C (108 °F). The difference in the two values does not alter the safety classification of isoprenol as a category 3 flammable liquid under the GHS; but the lower value quoted here (from the New Zealand Environmental Risk Management Authority) would make it a class IC flammable liquid instead of a class II combustible liquid under the U.S. OSHA classification (29 C.F.R § 1910.106), and F3 rather than F2 under the NFPA 704 standard.)

Related compounds
Related compounds	Prenol
- Except where otherwise noted, data are given for materials in their standard state (at 25 °C [77 °F], 100 kPa). verify (what is ?) Infobox references

Isoprenol, also known as 3-methylbut-3-en-1-ol, is a hemiterpene alcohol. It is produced industrially as an intermediate to 3-methylbut-2-en-1-ol (prenol): global production in 2001 can be estimated as 6–13 thousand tons.

== Synthesis ==
Isoprenol is produced by the reaction between isobutene (2-methylpropene) and formaldehyde, in what is arguably the simplest example of the Prins reaction.

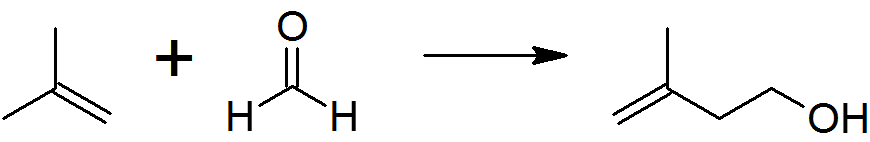
The reaction of isobutene with formaldehyde to give isoprenol, the first step in the industrial manufacture of prenol.

== Reactions ==
The thermodynamically preferred prenol, with the more substituted double bond, cannot be directly formed in the above reaction but is produced via a subsequent isomerisation:

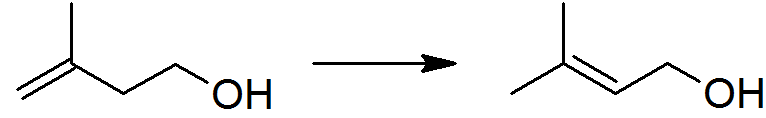
The isomerization of isoprenol to prenol, the second step in the industrial manufacture of prenol.

This isomerisation reaction is catalyzed by any species which can form an allyl complex without excessive hydrogenation of the substrate, for example poisoned palladium catalysts.

Oxidation (or more technically dehydrogenation) gives the aldehyde (3-methyl-3-butenal), which is used for the industrial synthesis of citral and other compounds. BASF achieves this transformation at scale using a silica-supported silver catalyst.

Isoprenol can be dehydrated to isoprene, although this process is often not cost effective compared to its more usual method of production, via the thermal cracking of petroleum naphtha.

== Uses ==
Isoprenol is primarily a feedstock used in the production of other more valuable chemicals. Its prenol and 3-methyl-3-butenal derivatives are used together in the formation of citral, which is used both as an aroma compound and as a starting material in the production of ionones such as vitamin E and vitamin A. Isoprenol is also used in the synthesis of some pyrethroid pesticides.
