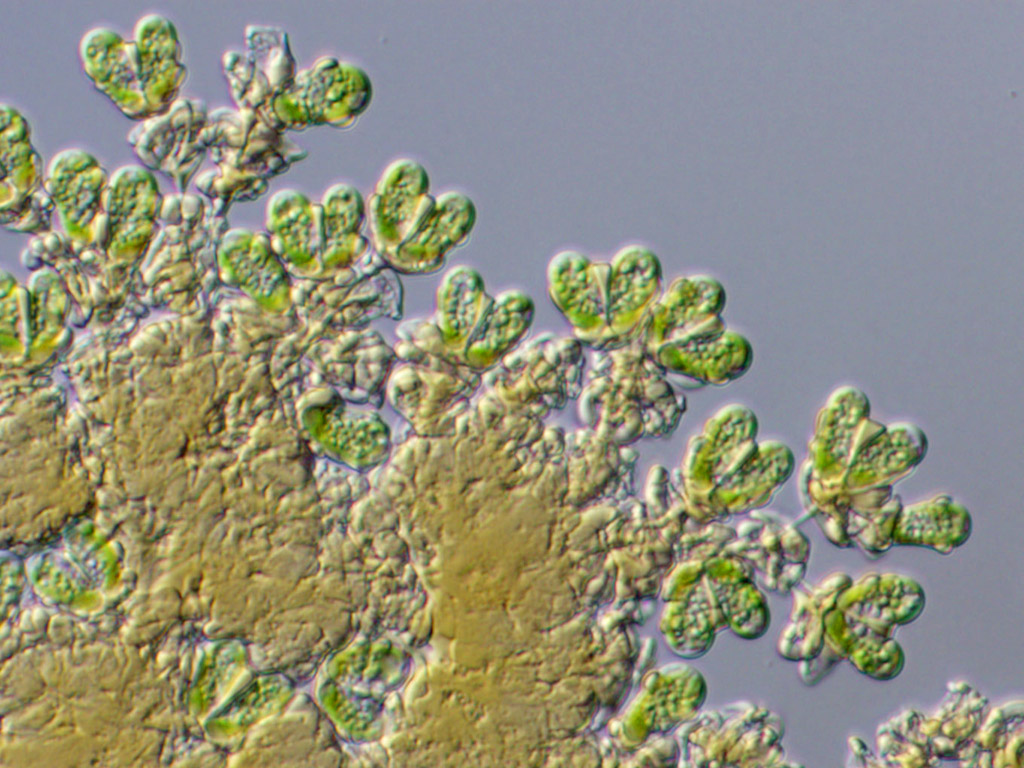

Scientific classification
- Domain: Eukaryota
- Clade: Archaeplastida
- Clade: Viridiplantae
- Division: Chlorophyta
- Class: Trebouxiophyceae
- Order: Trebouxiales
- Family: Botryococcaceae
- Genus: Botryococcus
- Species: B. braunii

Binomial name
- Botryococcus braunii Kützing

= Botryococcus braunii =

Species of alga

Botryococcus braunii is a green, pyramid-shaped planktonic microalga that is of potentially great importance in the field of biotechnology. Until 2024 it was considered to have three races: A, B, and L., but it was then determined that these are three separate species. Colonies are held together by a lipid biofilm matrix can be found in temperate or tropical oligotrophic lakes and estuaries, and will bloom when in the presence of elevated levels of dissolved inorganic phosphorus. The species is notable for its ability to produce high amounts of hydrocarbons, especially oils in the form of triterpenes, that are typically around 30–40% of their dry weight. Compared to other green alge species it has a relatively thick cell wall that is accumulated from previous cellular divisions, making extraction of cytoplasmic components rather difficult. Much of the useful hydrocarbon oil is outside of the cell.

== Description ==
Botryococcus braunii consists of colonies of cells up to 100 μm (sometimes up to 500 μm) in diameter, composed of subcolonies sometimes connected via mucilaginous strings. Cells are grouped around the periphery of a thick matrix, forming irregularly shaped clusters. Cells, or small groups of cells, are embedded within a mucilaginous sheath which covers about two-thirds of the cell, while the tip of the cell is covered by another mucilaginous, colorless cap. The matrix is colorless, but in old colonies may be colored yellow-brown. Cells are 6–14 μm long 4–11 μm wide, obovoid, in shape with a parietal, apical, lateral or basal chloroplast and an indistinct basal pyrenoid or pyrenoid-like body; the pyrenoid may not be visible in young cells or cultures. Reproduction occurs by the formation of autospores, typically two (sometimes four) per cell.

== Optimal growth environment ==
Botryococcus braunii has been shown to grow best at a temperature of 23 °C, a light intensity of 60 W/m^{2}, with a light period of 12 hours per day, and a salinity of 0.15 molar NaCl. However, this was the results of testing with one strain, and others certainly vary to some degree. In the laboratory, B. braunii is commonly grown in cultures of Chu 13 medium.

== Toxic blooms and competition ==
Blooms of Botryococcus braunii have been shown to be toxic to other micro-organisms and fishes. The cause of the blooms and their subsequent damage to the populations of other organisms has been studied. The exudate of Botryococcus braunii in the form of free fatty acids has been identified as the cause. A higher alkalinity changes these free fatty acids into a form which is more toxic to other species, thus causing Botryococcus braunii to become more dominant. Higher alkalinity often occurs when ashes from burned areas are washed into a body of water. While the dominance of Botryococcus braunii can be seen as damaging to the environmental diversity of a body of water, the knowledge of how it gains and maintains dominance is useful to those who intend to grow ponds of it as a fuel crop.

== Oils and potential use as biofuel ==
Three major races of Botryococcus braunii are known, and they are distinguished by the structure of their oils. Botryococcenes are highly branched isoprenoid triterpenes having the formula C_{n}H_{2n-10}. The A race produces alkadienes and alkatrienes (derivatives of fatty acids) wherein n is an odd number 23 through 31. The B race produces botryococcenes wherein n is in the range 30 through 37. Botryococcenes are the biofuels of choice for hydrocracking to gasoline-type hydrocarbons. The "L" strain makes an oil not formed by other strains of Botryococcus braunii. Within this major classification, various strains of Botryococcus will differ in the precise structure and concentrations of the constituent hydrocarbons oils.

According to the U.S. Department of Energy's Aquatic Species Program 1998 report, the A-strain of Botryococcus braunii did not function well as a feedstock for lipid-based fuel production due to its slow growth (one doubling every 72 hours). However, subsequent research by Qin showed that the doubling time could be reduced to 48 hours in its optimal growth environment. In view of findings by Frenz, the doubling times may not be as important as the method of hydrocarbon harvest. The Aquatic Species Program also found A-strain Botryococcus braunii oil to be less than ideal, having most of its lipids as C_{29} to C_{34} aliphatic hydrocarbons, and less abundance of C_{18} fatty acids. This evaluation of the oils of Botryococcus braunii was done in relation to their suitability for transesterification (i.e. creating biodiesel), which was the focus of the Aquatic Species Program at the time Botryococcus braunii was evaluated. The Aquatic Species Program did not study oils of Botryococcus braunii for their suitability in hydrocracking, as some subsequent studies have done on the "B" race.

Hydrocarbon oil constituents of Botryococcus braunii
Compound	% mass
Isobotryococcene	4%
Botryococcene	9%
C_{34}H_{58}	11%
C_{36}H_{62} (isomer A)	34%
C_{36}H_{62} (isomer B)	4%
C_{37}H_{64}	20%
Other hydrocarbons	18%

=== Extraction of oils ===
Compared to other green algae species, Botryococcus braunii has a relatively thick cell wall that is accumulated from previous cellular divisions, making extraction of cytoplasmic components rather difficult. Much of the useful hydrocarbon oil is outside of the cell, acting as a biofilm to aggregate individual cells into colonies. The best method of separating the oils from the cells with minimal damage to the cells has long been sought. For some time, it has been known that hexane can perform this function. However, an electrical method may be cleaner and better overall. Electric fields have been applied in short pulses to extract hydrocarbons from other species of microalgae by weakening the cell walls. These pulses have been microseconds to milliseconds in length. In April 2017 it was reported researchers at Kumamoto University in Japan have used shorter, nanosecond long pulses to target the extracellular matrix of Botryococcus braunii. They found the electric method to be less costly and less damaging to the cells than other methods. The Kumamoto scientists found that when the pulses are applied ten times per second, the optimal field strength was 50 kilovolts per centimeter and the optimal energy applied to be 55.6 Joules per milliliter of Botryococcus braunii matrix. Polysaccharides are also extracted from the matrix and must be separated from the oils.

=== Biofuel applications ===
The practice of farming algal species is known as algaculture. Botryococcus braunii has potential for algaculture because of the hydrocarbons it produces, which can be chemically converted into fuels. Up to 86% of the dry weight of Botryococcus braunii can be long-chain hydrocarbons. The vast majority of these hydrocarbons are botryococcus oils: botryococcenes, alkadienes, and alkatrienes. Transesterification cannot be used to make biodiesel from Botryococcus oils. This is because these oils are not vegetable oils in the common meaning, in which they are fatty acid triglycerides. While Botryococcus oils are oils of vegetable origin, they are inedible and chemically very different, being triterpenes, and lack the free oxygen atom needed for transesterification. Botryococcus oils can be used as feedstock for hydrocracking in an oil refinery to produce octane (gasoline, a.k.a. petrol), kerosene, and diesel.

=== Ongoing research ===
Due to the burgeoning interest in alternatives to fossil fuels, research on Botryococcus braunii has increased.

In 2012, researchers at the Western Sydney University looked at using pyrolysis to remove carboxyl in coorongite, a naturally occurring residue of B. braunii, before further processing using hydrocracking and hydrogenation.

A 2013 study looked at the biofuel potential of a recently identified strain, GUBIOTJTBB1, found in a freshwater dam in Assam, India. It found that it was superior than previous strains tested so far, with an energy value of its sundried biomass, at 54.69 kJ/g, "higher than that of petroleum diesel fuel and nearly twice than other microalgae strains compared".

In April 2017, Tim Devarenne of Texas A&M University (TAMU) announced the DNA sequencing of the genome of B. braunii had been completed. A year earlier, in 2016, Dr. Devarenne's team at TAMU discovered the enzyme responsible for creating the Bb oil, known as lycopadiene. The enzyme is known as lycopadiene synthase, or LOS, is capable of making several types of oils. Devarenne suggested that the LOS gene might be might be implanted in other algae with faster metabolism, in order to speed up production of the oil.

== Potentially useful strains ==
This heading is a collection of strains of note because of their potential utility. Some of these strains are patented as a result of active DNA modification, while, others are from traditional selection processes.

In 1988, UC Berkeley was granted US Plant Patent 6169 for Botryococcus braunii variety Showa, developed by UC Berkeley scientist Arthur Nonomura, in the Melvin Calvin Laboratory as part of the Nobel laureate's groundbreaking interdisciplinary program for the development of renewable transport fuels. The proprietary variety was notable, says the patent application, because of its highly reproducible botryococcenes hydrocarbon content comprising 20% of the dry weight of "Showa." It is clear that Showa was borne out as the top source of hydrocarbons of its time. The patent expired in April 2008.

In May 2006, Nonomura filed an international patent application disclosing novel growth and harvesting processes for the Chlorophyta. A separate patent for plants is also filed on Botryococcus braunii variety Ninsei that exhibits the feature of extracolonial secretion of it botryococcenoids that can be processed in existing gasoline refineries to transport fuels.

In August 2011, variety Enomoto was announced by IHI NeoG Algae LLC. It has "...the highest yield for this fuel production over all the algae that have been discovered in the world", with a claimed monthly growth a thousand times higher than normal strains Botryococcus braunii. It is additionally said to be very robust, presumably meaning it could be grown in an open environment (in ponds, instead of photobioreactors).

== See also ==
- Coorongite, a substance possibly formed from Botryococcus braunii B, found in Australia
- Torbanite, a type of oil shale formed from Botryococcus braunii deposits
