= Tetraterpenes =

The chemical structure of cryptoxanthin, a yellow tetraterpenoid of the xanthophyll type.

Tetraterpenes are terpenes consisting of eight isoprene units and have the molecular formula C_{40}H_{64}. Tetraterpenoids (including many carotenoids) are tetraterpenes that have been chemically modified, as indicated by the presence of oxygen-containing functional groups.

Phytoene is biosynthesized via the head-to-head condensation of two GGPP molecules. One group of tetraterpenes, and possibly the most studied one, is the carotenoids pigments. Carotenoids have important biological functions, with roles in light capture, antioxidative activity and protection against free radicals, synthesis of plant hormones and as structural components of the membranes. Aside their biological relevance, carotenoids are also high-value compounds for the food and pharmaceutical industries. Carotenoids are biosynthesized by photosynthetic and non-photosynthetic organisms; however, in photosynthetic organisms, they are essential components as accessory pigments for the light-harvesting reaction centers. Xanthophylls are another group of tetraterpene pigments distributed widely in nature.
