= C8H10O2 =

The molecular formula C_{8}H_{10}O_{2} (molar mass: 121.16490I2908821 g/mol) may refer to:

- Anisyl alcohol
- Creosol
- Dimethoxybenzene
  - 1,2-Dimethoxybenzene
  - 1,3-Dimethoxybenzene
  - 1,4-Dimethoxybenzene
- Phenoxyethanol
- Tyrosol
- 1-Phenyl-1,2-ethanediol
