= Boron trichloride =

- Boron trichloride

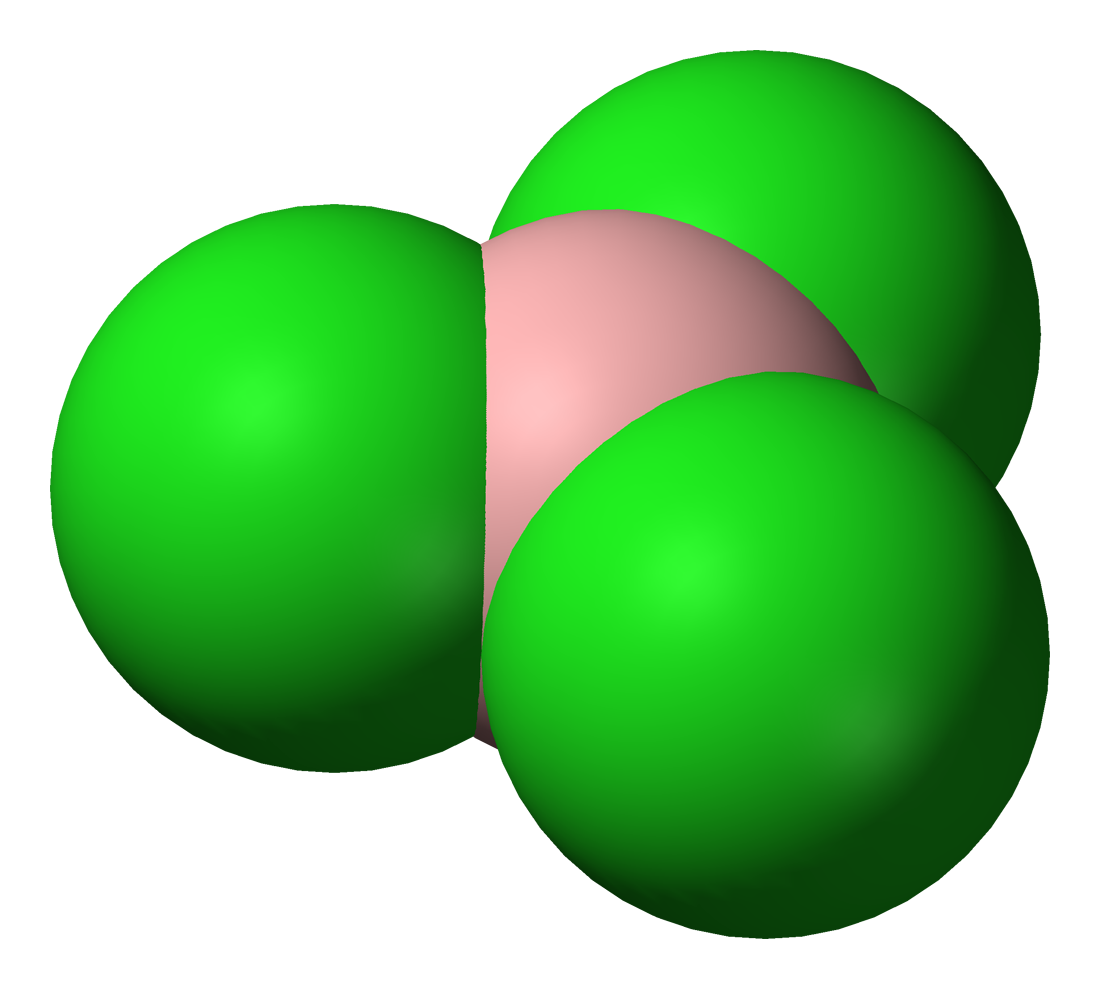
- Boron trichloride

Names
- IUPAC name Boron trichloride
- Other names Boron(III) chloride Trichloroborane

Identifiers
CAS Number	10294-34-5
3D model (JSmol)	Interactive image
ChemSpider	23480
ECHA InfoCard	100.030.586
EC Number	233-658-4
PubChem CID	25135
RTECS number	ED1925000
UNII	K748471RAG
CompTox Dashboard (EPA)	DTXSID2041676
- InChI: InChI=1S/B.3ClH/h;3*1H/q+3;;;/p-3 Key: PYQQLJUXVKZOPJ-UHFFFAOYSA-K; InChI=1/B.3ClH/h;3*1H/q+3;;;/p-3 Key: PYQQLJUXVKZOPJ-DFZHHIFOAV
- SMILES: ClB(Cl)Cl

Properties
Chemical formula	BCl_{3}
Molar mass	117.16 g·mol^{−1}
Appearance	Colorless gas, fumes in air
Density	1.326 g/cm^{3}
Melting point	−107.3 °C (−161.1 °F; 165.8 K)
Boiling point	12.6 °C (54.7 °F; 285.8 K)
Solubility in water	hydrolysis
Solubility	soluble in CCl_{4}, ethanol
Magnetic susceptibility (χ)	−59.8·10^{−6} cm^{3}/mol
Refractive index (n_{D})	1.00139

Structure
Molecular shape	Trigonal planar (D_{3h})
Dipole moment	zero

Thermochemistry
Heat capacity (C)	107 J/(mol·K)
Std molar entropy (S^{⦵}_{298})	206 J/(mol·K)
Std enthalpy of formation (Δ_{f}H^{⦵}_{298})	−427 kJ/mol
Gibbs free energy (Δ_{f}G^{⦵})	−387.2 kJ/mol

Hazards
- Occupational safety and health (OHS/OSH)
Main hazards	May be fatal if swallowed or if inhaled Causes serious burns to eyes, skin, mouth, lungs, etc. Contact with water gives HCl
- GHS labelling
Pictograms	
Signal word	Danger
Hazard statements	H300, H314, H330 (Note: Within the European Union, the following additional hazard statement (EUH014) must also be displayed on labelling: Reacts violently with water.)
NFPA 704 (fire diamond)	4 0 2 W
Flash point	Non-flammable
Safety data sheet (SDS)	ICSC 0616

Related compounds
Other anions	Boron trifluoride; Boron tribromide; Boron triiodide
Other cations	Aluminium trichloride; Gallium trichloride; Indium(III) chloride; Thallium(III) chloride
Related compounds	Boron trioxide; Carbon tetrachloride
- Except where otherwise noted, data are given for materials in their standard state (at 25 °C [77 °F], 100 kPa). verify (what is ?) Infobox references

Boron trichloride is the inorganic compound with the formula BCl_{3}. This colorless gas is a reagent in organic synthesis. It is highly reactive towards water.

== Production and structure ==
Boron reacts with halogens to give the corresponding trihalides. Boron trichloride is, however, produced industrially by chlorination of boron oxide and carbon at 501 °C.

B_{2}O_{3} + 3 C + 3 Cl_{2} → 2 BCl_{3} + 3 CO

The carbothermic reaction is analogous to the Kroll process for the conversion of titanium dioxide to titanium tetrachloride. One consequence of this synthesis route is that samples of boron trichloride are often contaminated with phosgene.

In the laboratory BCl_{3} can be prepared by treating with AlCl_{3} with BF_{3}, a halide exchange reaction.

BCl_{3} is a trigonal planar molecule like the other boron trihalides. The B–Cl bond length is 175 pm. A degree of π-bonding has been proposed to explain the short B− Cl distance, although there is some debate as to its extent. BCl_{3} does not dimerize, although NMR studies of mixtures of boron trihalides shows the presence of mixed halides. The absence of dimerisation contrasts with the tendencies of AlCl_{3} and GaCl_{3}, which form dimers or polymers with 4 or 6 coordinate metal centres.

== Reactions ==
BCl_{3} hydrolyzes readily to give hydrochloric acid and boric acid:

BCl_{3} + 3 H_{2}O → B(OH)_{3} + 3 HCl

Alcohols behave analogously giving the borate esters, e.g. trimethyl borate.

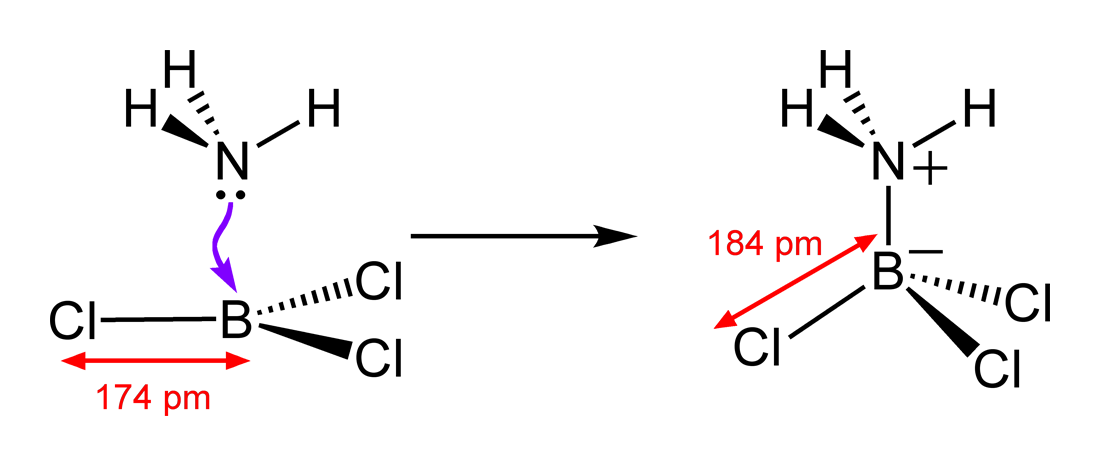
Ammonia forms a Lewis adduct with boron trichloride.

As a strong Lewis acid, BCl_{3} forms adducts with tertiary amines, phosphines, ethers, thioethers, and halide ions. Adduct formation is often accompanied by an increase in B-Cl bond length. BCl_{3}•S(CH_{3})_{2} (CAS# 5523-19-3) is often employed as a conveniently handled source of BCl_{3} because this solid (m.p. 88-90 °C) releases BCl_{3}:

(CH_{3})_{2}S·BCl_{3} ⇌ (CH_{3})_{2}S + BCl_{3}

The mixed aryl and alkyl boron chlorides are also of known. Phenylboron dichloride is commercially available. Such species can be prepared by the redistribution reaction of BCl_{3} with organotin reagents:

2 BCl_{3} + R_{4}Sn → 2 RBCl_{2} + R_{2}SnCl_{2}

=== Reduction ===
Reduction of BCl_{3} to elemental boron is conducted commercially in the laboratory, when boron trichloride can be converted to diboron tetrachloride by heating with copper metal:

2 BCl_{3} + 2 Cu → B_{2}Cl_{4} + 2 CuCl

B_{4}Cl_{4} can also be prepared in this way. Colourless diboron tetrachloride (m.p. −93 °C) is a planar molecule in the solid, (similar to dinitrogen tetroxide, but in the gas phase the structure is staggered. It decomposes (disproportionates) at room temperatures to give a series of monochlorides having the general formula (BCl)_{n}, in which n may be 8, 9, 10, or 11.

n B_{2}Cl_{4} → B_{n}Cl_{n} + n BCl_{3}

The compounds with formulas B_{8}Cl_{8} and B_{9}Cl_{9} are known to contain closed cages of boron atoms.

== Uses ==
Boron trichloride is a starting material for the production of elemental boron. It is also used in the refining of aluminium, magnesium, zinc, and copper alloys to remove nitrides, carbides, and oxides from molten metal. It has been used as a soldering flux for alloys of aluminium, iron, zinc, tungsten, and monel. Aluminium castings can be improved by treating the melt with boron trichloride vapors. In the manufacture of electrical resistors, a uniform and lasting adhesive carbon film can be put over a ceramic base using BCl_{3}. It has been used in the field of high energy fuels and rocket propellants as a source of boron to raise BTU value. BCl_{3} is also used in plasma etching in semiconductor manufacturing. This gas etches metal oxides by formation of a volatile BOCl_{x} and M_{x}O_{y}Cl_{z} compounds.

BCl_{3} is used as a reagent in the synthesis of organic compounds. Like the corresponding bromide, it cleaves C-O bonds in ethers.

== Safety ==
BCl_{3} is an aggressive reagent that can form hydrogen chloride upon exposure to moisture or alcohols. The dimethyl sulfide adduct (BCl_{3}SMe_{2}), which is a solid, is much safer to use, when possible, but H_{2}O will destroy the BCl_{3} portion while leaving dimethyl sulfide in solution.

== See also ==
- List of highly toxic gases
