= Botryosphaeran =

Exopolysaccharide

Identifiers
CAS Number	610312-16-8
- Except where otherwise noted, data are given for materials in their standard state (at 25 °C [77 °F], 100 kPa). Infobox references

Botryosphaeran is an exopolysaccharide (EPS) produced by the ascomyceteous fungus Botryosphaeria rhodina. Characterization of the chemical structure of botryosphaeran showed this EPS to be a (1→3)(1→6)-β-D-glucan. This particular β-glucan can be produced by several strains of Botryosphaeria rhodina that include: MAMB-05, DABAC-P82, and RCYU 30101. Botryosphaeran exhibits interesting rheological properties and novel biological functions including hypoglycaemia, hypocholesterolaemia, anti-atheroslerosis and anti-cancer activity, with potential commercial applications. Three cosmetic products formulated with botryosphaeran have been developed to promote skin health and treat skin conditions for future intended commercialization purposes.

== History ==
The ascomycete and filamentous fungus, Botryosphaeria rhodina (strain MAMB-05), was isolated from a canker on the trunk of a eucalypt tree, and was molecularly characterized by sequencing the Internal Transcribed Spacer (ITS) region of rDNA.

The β-glucan, botryosphaeran, was discovered accidentally in 1994 while cultivating Botryosphaeria rhodina MAMB-05 on nutrient media containing glucose to produce the enzyme, laccase. This fungal isolate produces a constitutive laccase that could be induced to higher enzyme titers by various lignin-like aromatic compounds, and especially veratryl alcohol. The fungus was found to be ligninolytic.

Botryosphaeran is secreted by the fungus during growth and appears in the fermentation broth where its presence causes an increase in the broth's viscosity. It can easily be extracted from the broth by precipitation methods. Veratryl alcohol, however, suppresses the formation of botryosphaeran.

== Production and isolation ==
Botryosphaeran is produced under submerged fermentation conditions when Botryosphaeria rhodina MAMB-05 is grown on nutrient media containing glucose and mineral salts. Extracting the fermentation broth with alcohol causes the EPS (botryosphaeran) to precipitate from solution, and this can be separated by centrifugation or filtration.

The precipitate recovered can be lyophilized to a white fibrous material that is sparingly soluble in water. Alternatively, the recovered precipitate is resolubilized in water (gentle heating with stirring) to form a viscous solution that forms a firm gel when cooled to 5 °C. Solubilization of botryosphaeran can be enhanced through chemical derivatization with various functional groups.

The influence of the composition of the nutrient medium, including nitrogen, phosphate, minerals, supplements (soybean oil, Tween 80), and the carbon source (carbohydrates), is important in enhancing the production of botryosphaeran and biomass during fermentation by Botryosphaeria rhodina MAMB-05.

Catabolite repression, and the presence of β-glucan-hydrolyzing enzymes that attack botryosphaeran during the fermentation process are critical and limit the production of botryosphaeran.

Statistical factorial design methods, such as the response surface methodology (RSM), are effective in investigating complex fermentation parameters and their interactions to optimize metabolite production by microorganisms. RSM assists in defining the effects and interactions of the physiological factors playing a role in biotechnological processes in the production of microbial metabolites including exopolysaccharides such as β-glucans. Statistical methodologies reduce the number of experiments to provide sufficient information for statistically acceptable results.

The validation of the fermentation parameters by statistical factorial design improved botryosphaeran production by Botryosphaeria rhodina MAMB-05 over unoptimized conditions.

Botryosphaeria rhodina MAMB-05 when grown on nutrient media containing different carbohydrate substrates produces a family of botryosphaerans. These β-glucans differ only in the extent and frequency of side-chain substituents.

Botryosphaeran production can be enhanced when Botryosphaeria rhodina MAMB-05 is cultivated on glucose media containing soybean oil and the surfactant, Tween 80.

The most attractive feature for the commercialization of botryosphaeran is the ease by which it can be produced by simple fermentation processes on low-cost nutrient media, and its subsequent isolation through precipitation with ethanol, which all takes place on a time-scale of days compared to other commercial β-glucans available on the market. The latter are extracted from fungal fruiting bodies (mushrooms, fungal brackets), spent Brewers yeast, and cereal grains (barley, oat) that can take weeks-to-months to prepare.

The mycelium of Botryosphaeria rhodina MAMB-05 is a rich source of β-glucans.

== Chemical structure ==
The chemical structure of botryosphaeran was first described in 2003, and was determined using the methods: methylation analysis, Smith degradation, Gas Chromatography-Mass Spectroscopy (GC-MS) and ^{13}C NMR.

== Hydrolysis ==
Total acid hydrolysis of botryosphaeran produces only D-glucose, while partial acid hydrolysis and enzymatic hydrolysis produces a series of homologous gluco-oligosaccharides of different degrees of polymerization, which can be analyzed by High Performance Liquid Chromatography (HPLC).

Enzymatic digestion of botryosphaeran under controlled conditions employing the enzymes: β-(1→3)-glucanases and β-(1→6)-glucanases from Botryosphaeria rhodina MAMB-05,Trichoderma harzianum Rifai, and Aureobasidium pullulans 1WA1, produces a mixed series of β-(1→3)- and β-(1→6)- linked gluco-oligosaccharides that can serve as prebiotics.

Enzymes hydrolyzing botryosphaeran can be obtained by cultivating Botryosphaeria rhodina MAMB-05, Trichoderma harzianum Rifai and Aureobasidium pullulans 1WA1 on nutrient media containing either botryosphaeran, or the biomass derived from Botryosphaeria rhodina MAMB-05, which is a rich source of β-glucans.

Prebiotics such as the (1→3)-linked gluco-oligosaccharides are emerging as nutraceuticals for inclusion in foods. Botryosphaeran can serve as a source of conveniently generating these oligosaccharides through enzymatic hydrolysis.

== Chemical structure characterization ==
Methylation and Smith degradation analysis revealed that botryosphaeran constituted a backbone chain made up of (1→3)-β-linked glucose residues (i.e., it is a (1→3)-β-D-glucan) with β-(1→6)-linked glucose and di-glucose (gentiobiose) side-branches located at the C-6 position of glucose along the (1→3)-linked backbone chain. The chemical structure of botryosphaeran is a (1→3)(1→6)-β-D-glucan. ^{13}C NMR spectroscopy confirmed its structure.

The degree of branching of the family of botryosphaerans varies from 21 to 31%. depending upon the carbohydrate source in the nutrient media during fermentation by the fungus, and this also affects the molecular weight (MW) of the botryosphaerans produced, which can be large (greater than on the order of 1 million daltons)

Botryosphaeran exists in a triple helix conformation, an important structural feature in manifesting biological response modifying activities.

Derivatization of botryosphaeran by carboxymethylation and sulfonylation results in improved solubility in water, and diminishes its viscous nature in solution.

In the case of sulfonated botryosphaeran, the chemically modified polysaccharide containing sulfonate groups exhibited new biological functions: anticoagulation, and antiviral activity against enveloped viruses such as human herpes simplex and Dengue, The latter is a mosquito-borne virus.

Related exopolysaccharides (β-glucans) from several strains of Botryosphaeria rhodina (the teleomorph Lasiodiplodia theobromae) isolated from rotting tropical fruits have been described, The chemical structures of three β-glucans produced were characterized; a (1→3)(1→6)-β-D-glucan with a single glucose repeat substituent (frequency of 20%), an unbranched (1→6)-β-glucan named lasiodiplodan, and a new (1→3)(1→6)-β-glucan with unique branches comprising gentiobiose and gentiotriose residues, but not glucose.

Structural characterization of the cell wall (mycelium) of Botryosphaeria rhodina MAMB-05 revealed the presence of three different D-glucans; a linear (1→6)-β-glucan, a branched (1→3)(1→6)-β-glucan with single glucose repeat branches (frequency of 18%), and a glycogen-like (1→4)(1→6)-α-glucan.

== Biosafety ==
Botryosphaeran was demonstrated in extensive studies on mice and mammalian cell-lines (hamster, rat, human) that it was not mutagenic (assessed by the micronucleus test), nor was it genotoxic as assessed by the Ames test and Comet assay.

When administered orally to mice by gavage, botryosphaeran reduced the clastogenic effect of cyclophosphamide-induced micronucleus formation in bone marrow (polychromatic erythrocytes) and peripheral blood (reticulocytes) cells.

Using mammalian cell lines: lung fibroblasts (Chinese hamster) and hepatocarcinoma cells (rat), botryosphaeran was confirmed not to be mutagenic nor genotoxic by the micronucleus test and Comet assay procedures. Botryosphaeran exhibited no mutagenicity, and protected cultured human whole blood lymphocytes against DNA damage and cell death induced by bleomycin throughout the cell cycle stage. Botryosphaeran exhibited antigenotoxic activity against damage induced by methyl methanesulfonate, in normal and tumorigenic (Jurkat) human lymphocytes.

The absence of mutagenicity and genotoxicity assessed by the micronucleus, Ames and MTT tests, and the Comet assay, established that botryosphaeran has GRAS status (Generally Recommended As Safe), and is safe for use by humans and animals.

== Rheological properties ==
The rheological properties of botryosphaeran has been described.

Botryosphaeran forms a viscous solution when dissolved in water that is stable to heat as occurs during autoclaving (steam sterilization). When an aqueous solution of botryosphaeran is cooled to 5 °C, it forms a strong gel that is firm and transparent.

== Biological functions ==
Botryosphaeran possesses in-vitro free-radical scavenging properties and antioxidant activities.

Botryosphaeran exhibits an in-vivo antioxidant role in the β-cell line INS-1E derived from rat insulinoma (tumor of the pancreas derived from β-cells). Oxidative stress was induced by hydrogen peroxide (H_{2}O_{2}) in the INS-1E cells under high glucose, and botryosphaeran decreased this condition by reducing the production of reactive oxygen species (ROS). Apoptosis increased in the INS-1E cells treated with H_{2}O_{2} in high glucose conditions, and treatment with botryosphaeran attenuated apoptosis.

Botryosphaeran exerts a chemoprotective effect exhibiting strong antimutagenic (anticlastogenic) activity against the in-vivo DNA-damaging effect of cyclophosphamide in mice., and genotoxic damage by doxorubicin in fibroblasts and hepatocarcinoma cells, bleomycin in human lymphocytes, and methyl methanesulfonate in Jurkat cells.

Botryosphaeran exhibits hypoglycaemic activity (lowering of blood glucose levels) in rats in which diabetes was induced by intramuscular injection of streptozotocin, which selectively damages the pancreatic insulin-secreting β-cells resulting in type-1 diabetes condition.

The cholesterol-lowering effect (hypocholesterolaemia) of β-glucans derived from oat and barley (β-(1→3)(1→4)-linked D-glucans) is well established. Botryosphaeran exhibits hypocholesterolaemic activity lowering total cholesterol and Low Density Lipoprotein (LDL)-cholesterol blood levels in rats preconditioned on hyperlipidaemic diets.

In experiments with elderly male knockout LDLr^{-/-}mice (LDLreceptor-deficient mice that show elevated plasma cholesterol levels and develop atherosclerosis), botryosphaeran reduced the plasma glucose levels, improved the lipidic profiles, reduced LDL-cholesterol, and decreased aortic lipid deposition that lowers cardiovascular risks of atherosclerosis.

Treatment of obese rats with botryosphaeran by gavage was effective in ameliorating the comorbidities (diabetes, dyslipidaemia, hepatic steatosis) associated with obesity. Botryosphaeran reduces hepatic steatosis and dyslipidaemia, and glucose intolerance in diet-induced obese rats through activation of AMP-activated protein-kinase (AMPK) and the expression of the Forkhead transcription factor, FOXO3a, in adipose tissue.

Obese rats showed significant increases in weight gain, adipose tissue mass, and adiposity and atherogenic indices, and presented glucose intolerance, insulin resistance, dyslipidaemia, and hepatic steatosis. Botryosphaeran significantly reduces feed intake, weight gains, periepididymal and mesenteric fat, and improves glucose tolerance in obese rats. Botryosphaeran, furthermore, reduces the serum levels of triglyceride and VLDL-cholesterol, and increased HDL-cholesterol and glycogen in liver, and reduces the atherogenic index.

The above data demonstrated the beneficial effects of botryosphaeran in reducing the stimulatory effect of obesity on dyslipidaemia and hepatic steatosis, and can play a potential role in the management of obesity comorbidities.

Studies on human carcinoma cell-lines: Jurkat (lymphocytes) and breast (MCF-7) demonstrated that botryosphaeran manifests anti-cancer activity.

The action by which anticancer activity occurs is still not well understood, but a mechanistic insight on how this may occur in breast cancer MCF-7 cells was advanced in 2015, and involves cell-signaling pathways that suppress tumourigenesis (cell antiproliferation) through apoptosis, necrosis and oxidative stress. Botryosphaeran-induced apoptosis was mediated by AMPK and FOXO3a.

In tumorigenic human lymphocytes (Jurkat cells), botryosphaeran modulates gene expression and regulates cell cycle and the cell cycle checkpoint.

Encapsulation of probiotic bacteria (Lactobacillus casei) in alginate microspheres together with botryosphaeran and mucilages from linseed and okra increases the encapsulation efficiency, and improves the stability of the encapsulated probiotic bacteria during prolonged storage at 5 °C. Gastrointestinal simulation of the microencapsulated Lactobacillus casei cells demonstrated preservation of the viability of the probiotic bacteria against low pH and bile salts. The use of botryosphaeran in microencapsulating probiotic bacteria appears to be another promising application for this β-glucan.

New applications for botryosphaeran have included: biological response modifying activities of derivatized botryosphaerans; treatment of skin conditions (eczema, psoriasis, wound healing); antimicrobial activities; antinociceptive activity; as a matrix for enzyme (laccase) immobilization; as a platform for electrochemical sensors; and as a food additive (nutraceutical).

The biomass resulting from Botryosphaeria rhodina MAMB-05 on producing botryosphaeran by submerged fermentation has been successfully used as a biosorbent to extract metallic species; rare earth elements (lanthanides; La, Sm), and heavy metals (lead; Pb) from industrial effluents.
