= 3,4-Dimethoxystyrene =

Names
- Preferred IUPAC name 4-Ethenyl-1,2-dimethoxybenzene
- Other names 1,2-Dimethoxy-4-vinylbenzene; 4-Vinylveratrole; 4-Vinyl-1,2-dimethoxybenzene

Identifiers
CAS Number	6380-23-0
ChemSpider	55329
ECHA InfoCard	100.026.330
EC Number	228-962-9
PubChem CID	61400
UNII	50PLH4M73W
CompTox Dashboard (EPA)	DTXSID6064296
- InChI: InChI=11/C10H12O2/c1-4-8-5-6-9(11-2)10(7-8)12-3/h4-7H,1H2,2-3H

Properties
Chemical formula	C_{10}H_{12}O_{2}
Molar mass	164.204 g·mol^{−1}
Appearance	Yellowish oily liquid
Odor	Sweet, floral
Density	1.109 g/cm^{3}
Boiling point	110–125 °C (230–257 °F; 383–398 K)
Refractive index (n_{D})	1.571

Hazards
- Occupational safety and health (OHS/OSH)
Main hazards	flammable, toxic
- GHS labelling
Pictograms	(GHS07: Exclamation mark)
Signal word	Warning
Hazard statements	H319
Precautionary statements	P264, P280, P305+P351+P338, P337+P313
Safety data sheet (SDS)	MSDS

Related compounds
Related styrenes; related aromatic compounds	styrene, dimethoxybenzene
- Except where otherwise noted, data are given for materials in their standard state (at 25 °C [77 °F], 100 kPa). verify (what is ?) Infobox references

3,4-Dimethoxystyrene (vinylveratrole) is an aromatic organic compound. It is a yellow oily liquid with a pleasant floral odor. Normally, it is supplied with 1-2% of the hydroquinone as an additive to prevent oxidation of the compound.

== Occurrence ==
3,4-Dimethoxystyrene has been identified as a naturally occurring component in the liverwort Cyathodium foetidissimum. 3,4-Dimethoxystyrene is also found in the essential oil of Brazilian propolis, as well as cereal and coffee products.

== Uses ==
- 3,4-Dimethoxystyrene is typically used in organic synthesis as a monomer in radical polymerization reactions due to the presence of the electron-deficient double bond. This is similar to the parent compound styrene, which can be polymerized into polystyrene.
- 3,4-dimethoxystyrene can be deprotected using Lewis acid boron tribromide with almost 100% yield. The resulting compound 3,4-dihydroxystyrene is rapidly oxidized in air, which is why 3,4-dimethoxystyrene is preferred as a stable precursor in organic synthesis.
- It is an easily polymerizable precursor to polycatechols as it is less susceptible to oxidation in air than other precursors.

== Pharmacology ==
=== Pharmacokinetics ===
Once ingested, 3,4-Dimethoxystyrene is found in the cytoplasm, and extracellularly.

== Related compounds ==
- 3,4-Dihydroxystyrene
- Veratrole
