= Boron-11 nuclear magnetic resonance spectroscopy =

Analytical Chemistry Technique

Boron-11 nuclear magnetic resonance spectroscopy (boron NMR or ^{11}B NMR) is an analytical technique and form of nuclear magnetic resonance spectroscopy used to detect and identify boron atoms in boron-containing molecules. Although ^{10}B is also an NMR-active nucleus, ^{11}B NMR is more widely used. Since using normal borosilicate glass NMR tubes contain boron and can heavily interfere with the ^{11}B NMR signal, alternatives are used, such as quartz glass.

== Nucleus ==
=== Receptivity ===
^{11}B NMR has relatively high sensitivity, since the ^{11}B isotope has high natural abundance. The gyromagnetic ratio of the nucleus is greater than that of ^{10}B and also slightly greater than that of ^{13}C. Additionally, the electric quadrupole moment (Q) of ^{11}B is lower than that of ^{10}B. Due to these reasons, ^{11}B is more favorable for NMR than ^{10}B, the other major boron isotope.

Property	^{10}B	^{11}B
Abundance	19.9%	80.1%
Spin	3	3/2
Gyromagnetic ratio (rad T^{-1} s^{-1})	2.874⋅10^{7}	8.584⋅10^{7}
Gyromagnetic ratio (MHz T^{-1})	4.5747339	13.6616080
Electric quadrupole moment (mb)	84.5	40.59

The T_{1} (relaxation time) for ^{11}B is 10^{-2}–10^{-3} seconds, much shorter than nuclei such as ^{1}H or ^{13}C.

=== Quadrupolar effects ===
^{11}B is a quadrupolar nucleus—meaning it has a non-spherical charge distribution—and predominantly undergoes the quadrupolar relaxation mechanism, resulting in broad peaks of over 10 Hz, which can obscure fine J-coupling.

== Chemical shifts ==
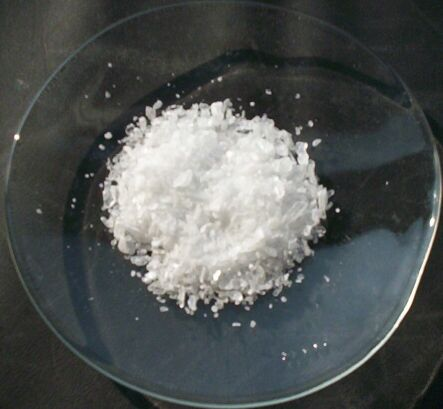
Boric acid, a reference used in solid-state ^{11}B NMR.

Typically, the reference sample defined as 0 ppm in ^{11}B NMR is BF_{3}·OEt_{2}, with an absolute frequency of 32.083974 MHz with respect to 100.00 MHz. Boric acid, H_{3}BO_{3}, may also be used as a reference in solid-state ^{11}B NMR, with a peak at 14.9 ppm. The solvent effect on ^{11}B NMR chemical shifts are small enough in magnitude that they can typically be neglected, although noticeable solvent shifts of up to 4 ppm have been observed, namely for polyhedral boranes and related compounds.

The chemical shift range for ^{11}B NMR is typically +100 to -120 ppm. Specifically, typical chemical shifts for different boron chemical environments are roughly:

- Trigonal planar ^{11}B: +100 to 0 ppm,
- Tetrahedral ^{11}B: 0 ppm to -120 ppm.

However, factors such as line shapes and quadrupolar coupling constants must be accounted for in order to assign structures, and chemical shifts alone are not always able to determine structures. For example, some tetrahedral boron complexes may show positive chemical shifts, depending on the environment.

== Coupling ==
In solution-state, several ^{11}B-^{11}B coupling constants (J) have been measured to range from 9-151 Hz. In solid-state, the coupling constants range from 98-136 Hz. The reported coupling constant for terminal ^{11}B-^{1}H bonds range from 100-190 Hz, while that of a hydrogen bridging bond is less than 80 Hz. Fine coupling may be obscured by broad peaks caused by the aforementioned quadrupolar effects.

== Applications ==
^{11}B NMR is used for identifying the environment of boron in boron-containing molecules such as diboron compounds, boronic esters, boronic acids, borates, and boron-containing Lewis acid-base adducts. It has been used to study reactions such as hydroboration.

^{11}B also has biomedical applications, such as Boron Neutron Capture Therapy.
