= Boron trifluoride =

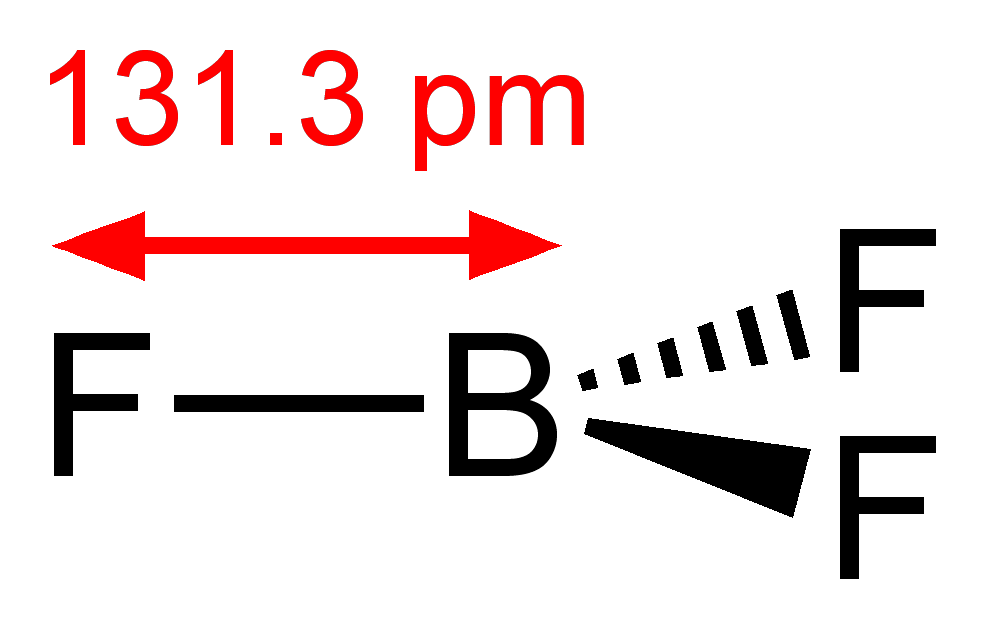
Boron trifluoride in 2D
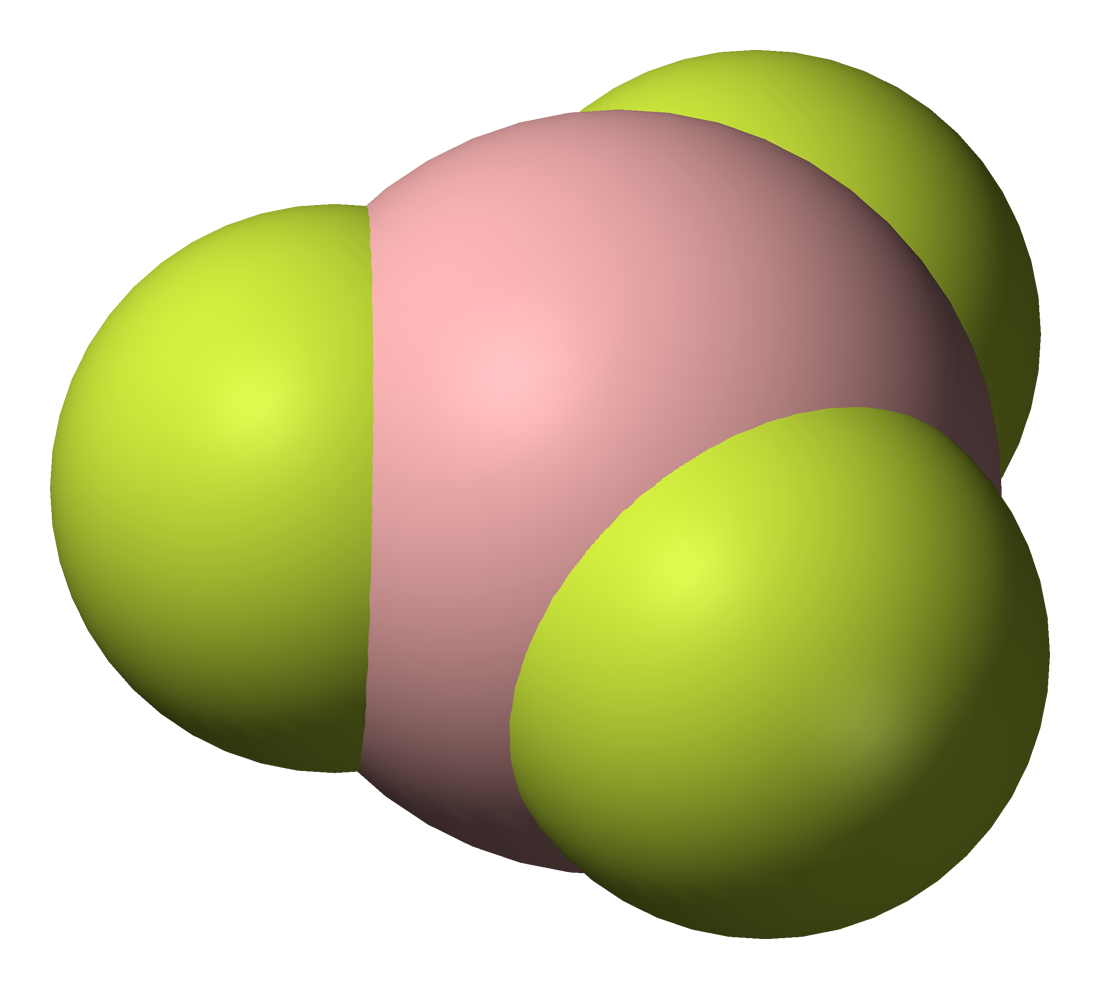
Boron trifluoride in 3D

Names
- IUPAC name Boron trifluoride
- Systematic IUPAC name Trifluoroborane
- Other names Boron fluoride, Trifluoroborane

Identifiers
CAS Number	7637-07-2; 13319-75-0 (dihydrate)
3D model (JSmol)	Interactive image; Interactive image
ChEBI	CHEBI:33093
ChemSpider	6116
ECHA InfoCard	100.028.699
EC Number	231-569-5
PubChem CID	6356
RTECS number	ED2275000
UNII	7JGD48PX8P
UN number	compressed: 1008. boron trifluoride dihydrate: 2851.
CompTox Dashboard (EPA)	DTXSID7041677
- InChI: InChI=1S/BF3/c2-1(3)4 Key: WTEOIRVLGSZEPR-UHFFFAOYSA-N
- SMILES: FB(F)F; [F+]=[B-](F)F

Properties
Chemical formula	BF_{3}
Molar mass	67.82 g/mol (anhydrous); 103.837 g/mol (dihydrate)
Appearance	colorless gas (anhydrous) colorless liquid (dihydrate)
Odor	Pungent
Density	0.00276 g/cm^{3} (anhydrous gas); 1.64 g/cm^{3} (dihydrate)
Melting point	−126.8 °C (−196.2 °F; 146.3 K)
Boiling point	−100.3 °C (−148.5 °F; 172.8 K)
Solubility in water	exothermic decomposition (anhydrous) very soluble (dihydrate)
Solubility	soluble in benzene, toluene, hexane, chloroform and methylene chloride
Vapor pressure	>50 atm (20 °C)
Dipole moment	0 D

Thermochemistry
Heat capacity (C)	50.46 J/(mol·K)
Std molar entropy (S^{⦵}_{298})	254.3 J/(mol·K)
Std enthalpy of formation (Δ_{f}H^{⦵}_{298})	−1137 kJ/mol
Gibbs free energy (Δ_{f}G^{⦵})	−1120 kJ/mol

Hazards
- GHS labelling
Pictograms	(GHS08: Health hazard)
Signal word	Danger
Hazard statements	H314, H330, H335, H373
Precautionary statements	P260, P280, P303+P361+P353, P304+P340, P305+P351+P338, P310, P403+P233
NFPA 704 (fire diamond)	3 0 1
Flash point	Nonflammable
- Lethal dose or concentration (LD, LC)
LC_{50} (median concentration)	1227 ppm (mouse, 2 hr); 39 ppm (guinea pig, 4 hr); 418 ppm (rat, 4 hr)
- NIOSH (US health exposure limits)
PEL (Permissible)	C 1 ppm (3 mg/m^{3})
REL (Recommended)	C 1 ppm (3 mg/m^{3})
IDLH (Immediate danger)	25 ppm
Safety data sheet (SDS)	ICSC 0231

Related compounds
Other anions	Boron trichloride; Boron tribromide; Boron triiodide
Other cations	Aluminium fluoride; Gallium(III) fluoride; Indium(III) fluoride; Thallium(III) fluoride
Related compounds	Boron monofluoride
- Except where otherwise noted, data are given for materials in their standard state (at 25 °C [77 °F], 100 kPa). verify (what is ?) Infobox references

Boron trifluoride is the inorganic compound with the formula BF_{3}. This pungent, colourless, and toxic gas forms white fumes in moist air. It is a useful Lewis acid and a versatile building block for other boron compounds.

== Structure and bonding ==
The geometry of a molecule of BF_{3} is trigonal planar. Its D_{3h} symmetry conforms with the prediction of VSEPR theory. The molecule has no dipole moment by virtue of its high symmetry. The molecule is isoelectronic with the carbonate anion, CO^{2−}_{3}.

BF_{3} is commonly referred to as "electron deficient," a description that is reinforced by its exothermic reactivity toward Lewis bases.

In the boron trihalides, BX_{3}, the length of the B–X bonds (1.30 Å) is shorter than would be expected for single bonds, and this shortness may indicate stronger B–X π-bonding in the fluoride. A facile explanation invokes the symmetry-allowed overlap of a p orbital on the boron atom with the in-phase combination of the three similarly oriented p orbitals on fluorine atoms. Others point to the ionic nature of the bonds in BF_{3}.

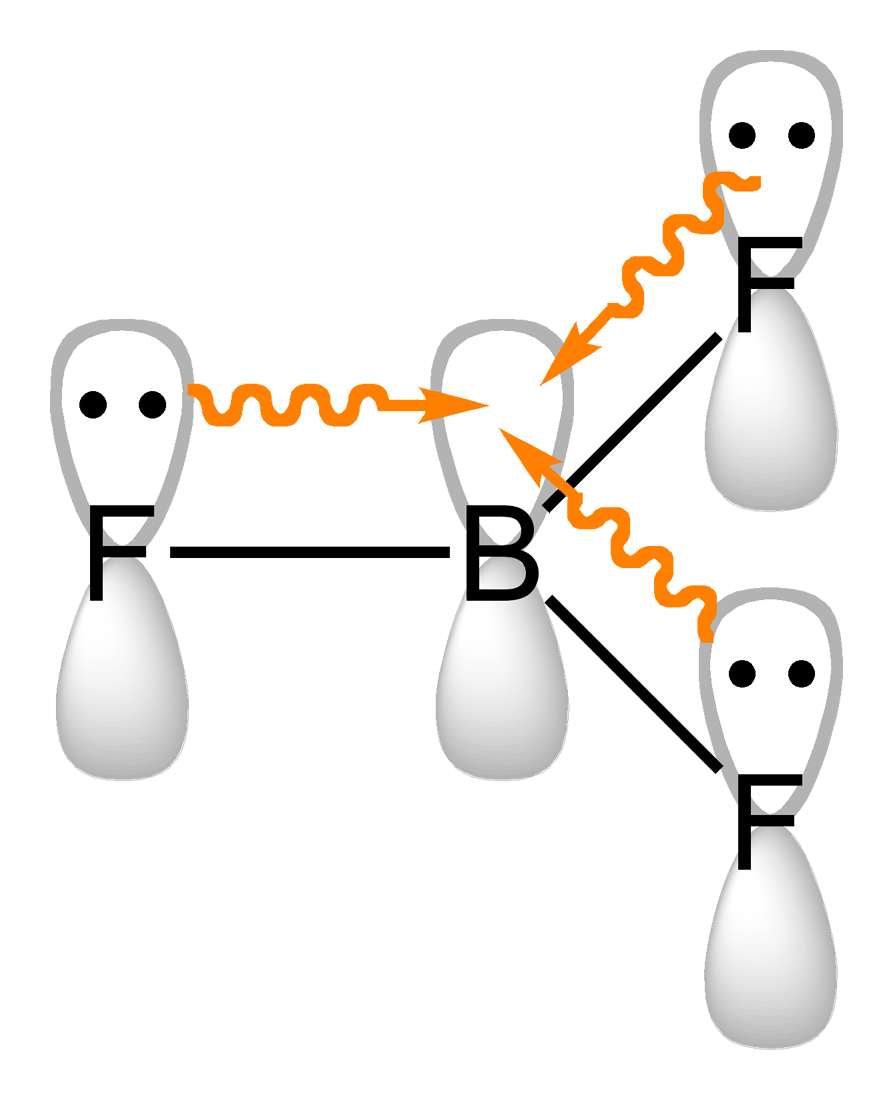

== Synthesis and handling ==
BF_{3} is manufactured by the reaction of boron oxides with hydrogen fluoride:

B_{2}O_{3} + 6 HF → 2 BF_{3} + 3 H_{2}O

Typically the HF is produced in situ from sulfuric acid and fluorite (CaF_{2}). Approximately 2300–4500 tonnes of boron trifluoride are produced every year.

=== Laboratory scale ===
For laboratory scale reactions, BF_{3} is usually produced in situ using boron trifluoride etherate, which is a commercially available liquid.

Laboratory routes to the solvent-free materials are numerous. A well documented route involves the thermal decomposition of diazonium salts of [BF_{4}]^{−}:

[PhN_{2}]^{+}[BF_{4}]^{−} → PhF + BF_{3} + N_{2}

It forms by treatment of a mixture boron trioxide and sodium tetrafluoroborate with sulfuric acid:

6 Na[BF_{4}] + B_{2}O_{3} + 6 H_{2}SO_{4} → 8 BF_{3} + 6 NaHSO_{4} + 3 H_{2}O

Alternatively, boron tribromide converts various organofluorine compounds to organobromines, evolving the trifluoride gas:

3 R–F + BBr_{3} → 3 R–Br + BF_{3}

== Properties ==
Anhydrous boron trifluoride has a boiling point of −100.3 °C and a critical temperature of −12.3 °C, so that it can be stored as a refrigerated liquid only between those temperatures. Storage or transport vessels should be designed to withstand internal pressure, since a refrigeration system failure could cause pressures to rise to the critical pressure of 49.85 bar (4.985 MPa).

Boron trifluoride is corrosive. Suitable metals for equipment handling boron trifluoride include stainless steel, monel, and hastelloy. In presence of moisture it corrodes steel, including stainless steel. It reacts with polyamides. Polytetrafluoroethylene, polychlorotrifluoroethylene, polyvinylidene fluoride, and polypropylene show satisfactory resistance. The grease used in the equipment should be fluorocarbon based, as boron trifluoride reacts with the hydrocarbon-based ones.

== Reactions ==
Unlike the aluminium and gallium trihalides, the boron trihalides are all monomeric. They undergo rapid halide exchange reactions:

BF_{3} + BCl_{3} → BF_{2}Cl + BCl_{2}F

Because of the facility of this exchange process, the mixed halides cannot be obtained in pure form.

Boron trifluoride is a versatile Lewis acid that forms adducts with such Lewis bases as fluoride and ethers:

CsF + BF_{3} → Cs[BF_{4}]
O(CH_{2}CH_{3})_{2} + BF_{3} → BF_{3}·O(CH_{2}CH_{3})_{2}

Tetrafluoroborate salts are commonly employed as non-coordinating anions. The adduct with diethyl ether, boron trifluoride diethyl etherate, or just boron trifluoride etherate, (BF_{3}·O(CH_{2}CH_{3})_{2}) is a conveniently handled liquid and consequently is widely encountered as a laboratory source of BF_{3}. Another common adduct is the adduct with dimethyl sulfide (BF_{3}·S(CH_{3})_{2}), which can be handled as a neat liquid.

=== Comparative Lewis acidity ===
All three lighter boron trihalides, BX_{3} (X = F, Cl, Br) form stable adducts with common Lewis bases. Their relative Lewis acidities can be evaluated in terms of the relative exothermicities of the adduct-forming reaction. Such measurements have revealed the following sequence for the Lewis acidity:

BF_{3} < BCl_{3} < BBr_{3} < BI_{3} (strongest Lewis acid)

This trend is commonly attributed to the degree of π-bonding in the planar boron trihalide that would be lost upon pyramidalization of the BX_{3} molecule. which follows this trend:

BF_{3} > BCl_{3} > BBr_{3} < BI_{3} (most easily pyramidalized)

The criteria for evaluating the relative strength of π-bonding are not clear, however. One suggestion is that the F atom is small compared to the larger Cl and Br atoms. As a consequence, the bond length between boron and the halogen increases while going from fluorine to iodine hence spatial overlap between the orbitals becomes more difficult. The lone pair electron in p_{z} of F is readily and easily donated and overlapped to empty p_{z} orbital of boron. As a result, the pi donation of F is greater than that of Cl or Br.

In an alternative explanation, the low Lewis acidity for BF_{3} is attributed to the relative weakness of the bond in the adducts F_{3}B−L.

Yet another explanation might be found in the fact that the p_{z} orbitals in each higher period have an extra nodal plane and opposite signs of the wave function on each side of that plane. This results in bonding and antibonding regions within the same bond, diminishing the effective overlap and so lowering the π-donating blockage of the acidity.

=== Hydrolysis ===
Boron trifluoride reacts with water to give boric acid and fluoroboric acid. The reaction commences with the formation of the aquo adduct, H_{2}O−BF_{3}, which then loses HF that gives fluoroboric acid with boron trifluoride.

4 BF_{3} + 3 H_{2}O → 3 H[BF_{4}] + B(OH)_{3}

The heavier trihalides also hydrolyze, but to boric and hydrohalic acids, possibly due to the lower stability of the tetrahedral ions [BCl_{4}]^{−} and [BBr_{4}]^{−}. Because of the high acidity of fluoroboric acid, the fluoroborate ion can be used to isolate particularly electrophilic cations, such as diazonium ions, that are otherwise difficult to isolate as solids.

== Uses ==
=== Organic chemistry ===
Boron trifluoride is most importantly used as a reagent in organic synthesis, typically as a Lewis acid. Examples include:

- initiates polymerisation reactions of unsaturated compounds, such as polyethers
- as a catalyst in some isomerization, acylation, alkylation, esterification, dehydration, condensation, Mukaiyama aldol addition, and other reactions

=== Niche uses ===
Other, less common uses for boron trifluoride include:

- applied as dopant in ion implantation
- p-type dopant for epitaxially grown silicon
- used in sensitive neutron detectors in ionization chambers and devices to monitor radiation levels in the Earth's atmosphere
- in fumigation
- as a flux for soldering magnesium
- to prepare diborane

== Discovery ==
Boron trifluoride was discovered in 1808 by Joseph Louis Gay-Lussac and Louis Jacques Thénard, who were trying to isolate "fluoric acid" (i.e., hydrofluoric acid) by combining calcium fluoride with vitrified boric acid. The resulting vapours failed to etch glass, so they named it fluoboric gas.

== See also ==
- List of highly toxic gases
