= Boron triiodide =

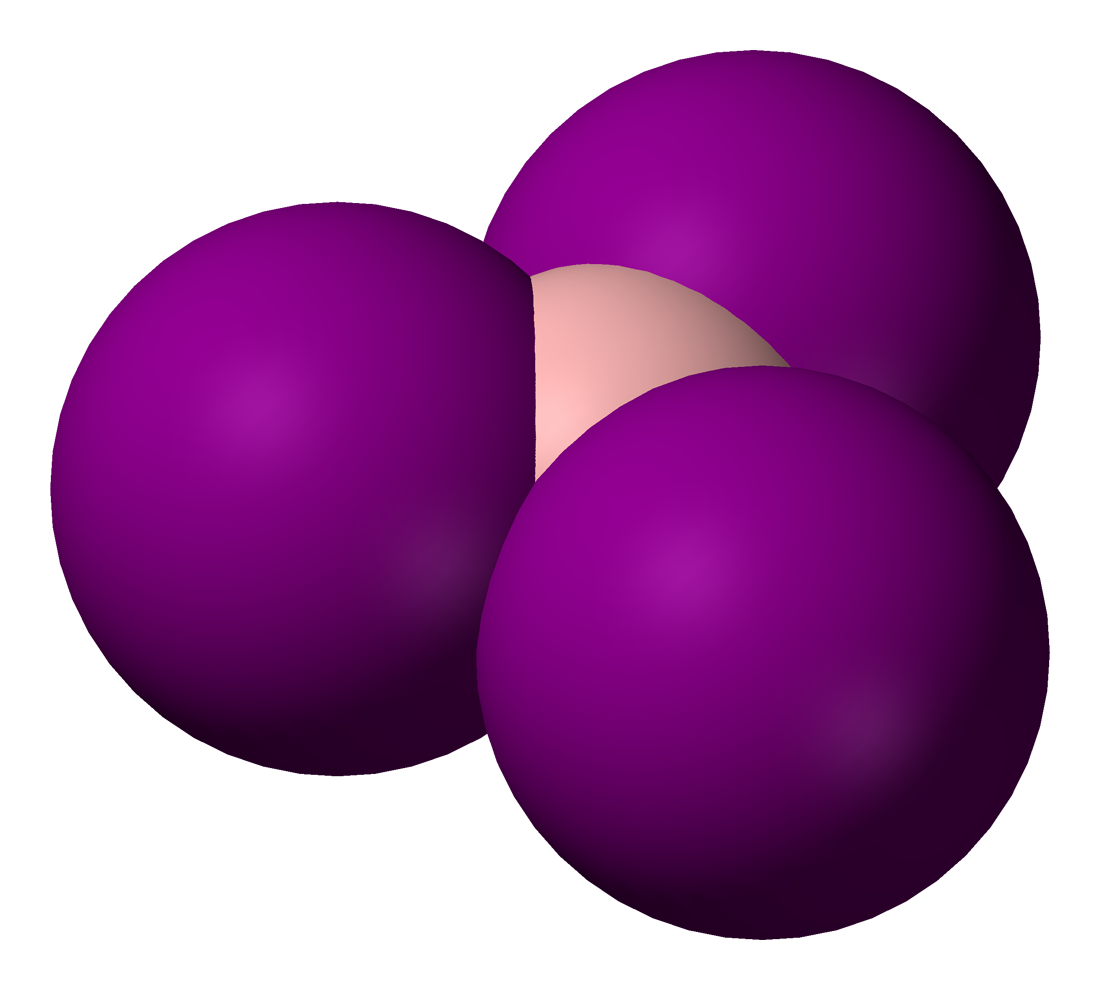

Names
- IUPAC name triiodoborane

Identifiers
CAS Number	13517-10-7
3D model (JSmol)	Interactive image
ChemSpider	75378
ECHA InfoCard	100.033.492
PubChem CID	83546
RTECS number	ED7400000
CompTox Dashboard (EPA)	DTXSID0065519
- InChI: InChI=1S/BI3/c2-1(3)4 Key: YMEKEHSRPZAOGO-UHFFFAOYSA-N; InChI=1/BI3/c2-1(3)4 Key: YMEKEHSRPZAOGO-UHFFFAOYAR
- SMILES: IB(I)I

Properties
Chemical formula	BI_{3}
Molar mass	391.52 g/mol
Appearance	crystalline solid
Density	3.35 g/cm^{3} (50 °C)
Melting point	49.9 °C (121.8 °F; 323.0 K)
Boiling point	210 °C (410 °F; 483 K)
Solubility in water	soluble, hydrolysis
Solubility	soluble in CCl_{4}, CS_{2}, benzene, chloroform
Dipole moment	0D

Structure
Crystal structure	hexagonal

Thermochemistry
Heat capacity (C)	71 J/mol K
Std molar entropy (S^{⦵}_{298})	200 J/mol K
Std enthalpy of formation (Δ_{f}H^{⦵}_{298})	−37.2 kJ/mol

Hazards
NFPA 704 (fire diamond)	3 0 0
Flash point	−18 °C (0 °F; 255 K)
Safety data sheet (SDS)	Sigma-Aldrich

Related compounds
Related compounds	Boron trifluoride Boron trichloride Boron tribromide
- Except where otherwise noted, data are given for materials in their standard state (at 25 °C [77 °F], 100 kPa). verify (what is ?) Infobox references

Boron triiodide is a chemical compound of boron and iodine with chemical formula BI_{3}. It has a trigonal planar molecular geometry.

== Preparation ==
Boron triiodide can be prepared by the reaction of boron with iodine at 209.5 °C or 409.1 °F. It can also be prepared by reacting hydroiodic acid with boron trichloride:

3HI + BCl_{3} → BI_{3} + 3HCl (reaction requires high temperature)

Another method is by reacting lithium borohydride with iodine. As well as boron triiodide, this reaction also produces lithium iodide, hydrogen and hydrogen iodide:

3LiBH_{4} + 8I_{2} → 3LiI + 3BI_{3} + 4H_{2} + 4HI

== Properties ==
In its pure state, boron triiodide forms colorless, otherwise reddish, shiny, air and hydrolysis-sensitive crystals, which have a hexagonal crystal structure (a = 699.09 ± 0.02 pm, c = 736.42 ± 0.03 pm, space group P6_{3}/m (space group no. 176)). Boron triiodide is a strong Lewis acid and soluble in carbon disulfide.

Boron triiodide reacts with water and decomposes to boric acid and hydriodic acid:

BI_{3} + 3H_{2}O ⇌ B(OH)_{3} + 3HI

Its dielectric constant is 5.38 and its heat of vaporization is 40.5 kJ/mol. At extremely high pressures, BI_{3} becomes metallic at ~23 GPa and is a superconductor above ~27 GPa.

== Applications ==
Boron triiodide can be used to produce other chemical compounds and as a catalyst (for example in coal liquefaction).
