= C27H30O6 =

The molecular formula C_{27}H_{30}O_{6} (molar mass: 450.52 g/mol, exact mass: 450.2042 u) may refer to:

- Cyclotriveratrylene (CTV)
- Sofalcone
