= Boron tribromide =

Chemical compound

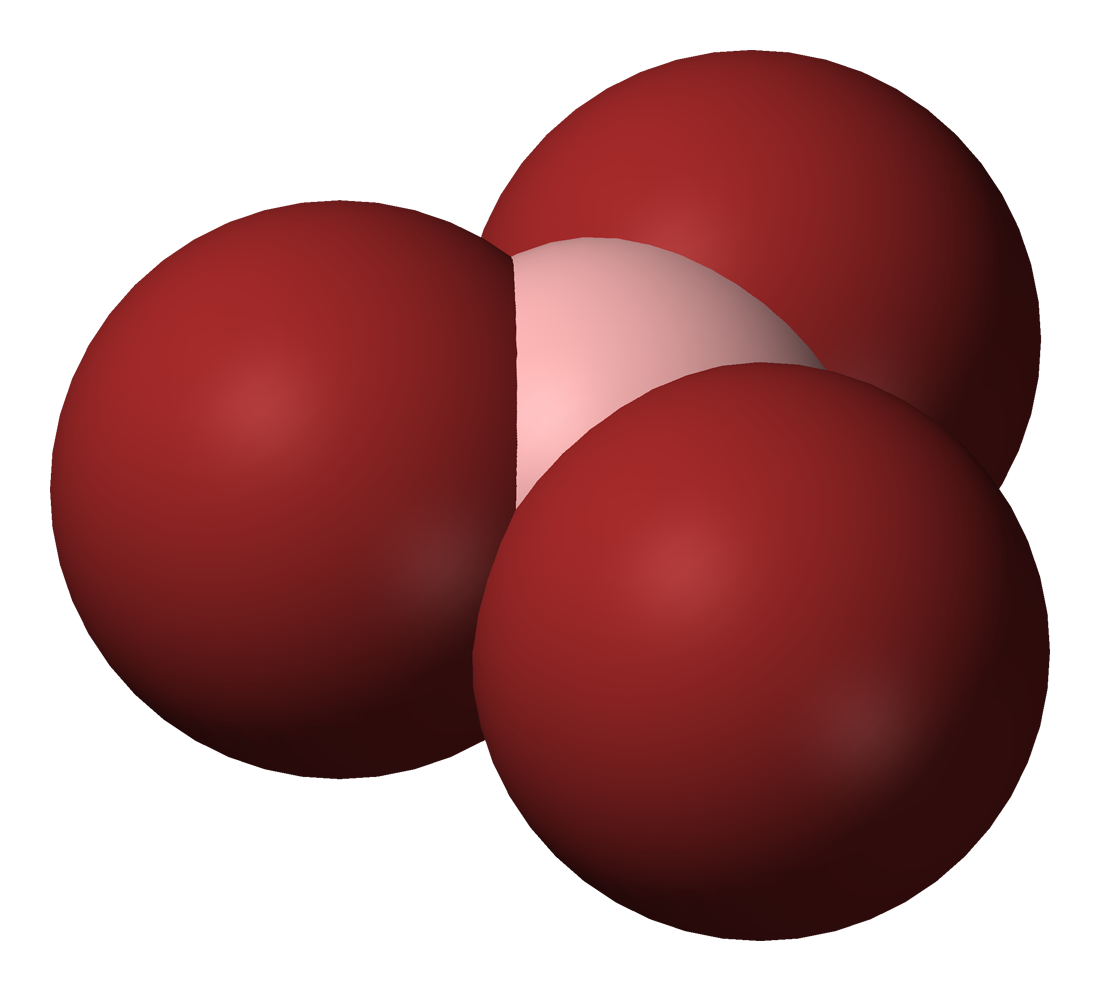
- Boron tribromide

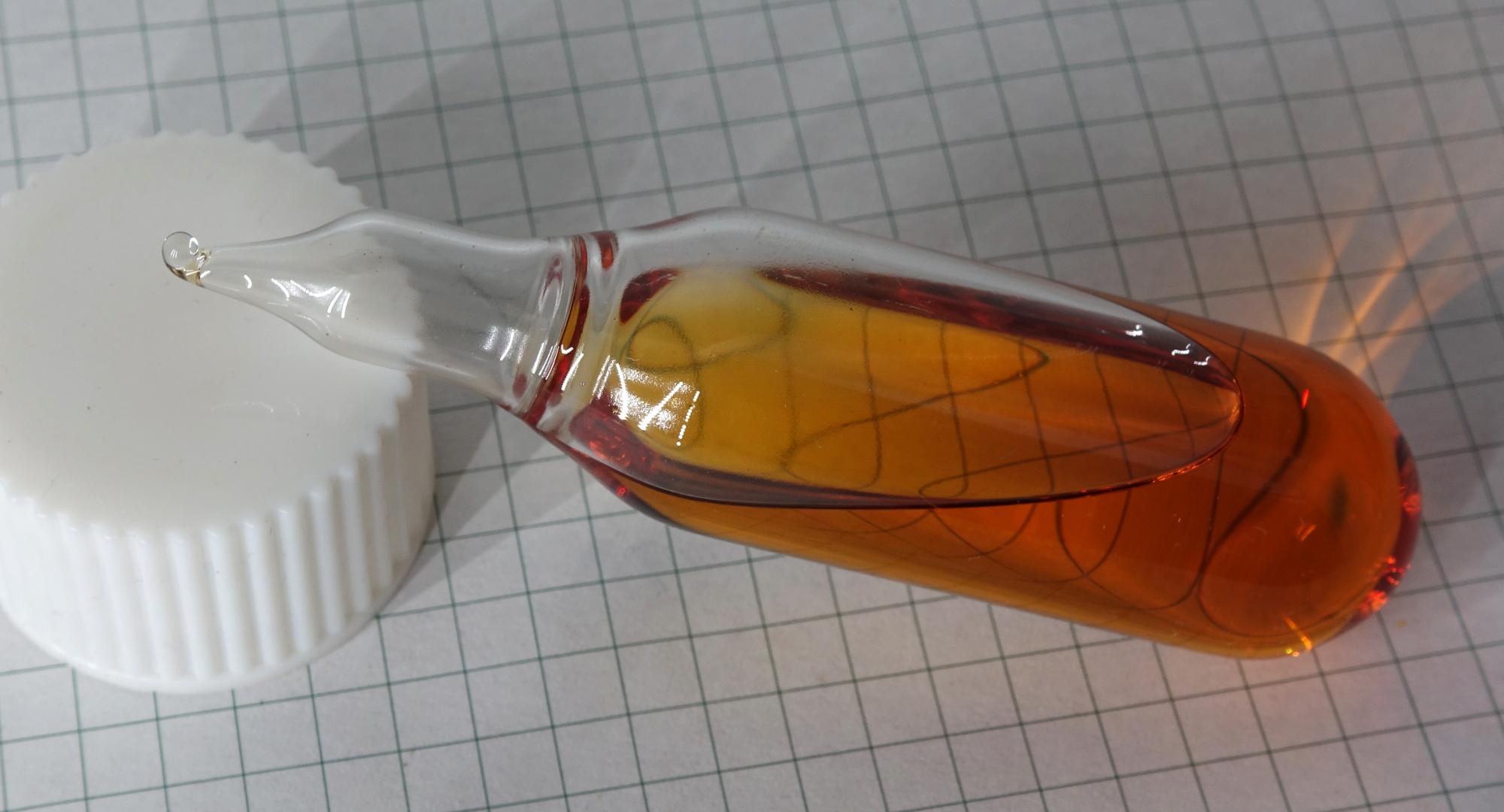
- Sample of boron tribromide

Names
- IUPAC name Boron tribromide
- Other names Tribromoborane, Boron bromide

Identifiers
| CAS Number | 10294-33-4 |
| 3D model (JSmol) | Interactive image |
| ChemSpider | 16787736 |
| ECHA InfoCard | 100.030.585 |
| EC Number | 233-657-9 |
| PubChem CID | 25134 |
| RTECS number | ED7400000 |
| UNII | A453DV9339 |
| UN number | 2692 |
| CompTox Dashboard (EPA) | DTXSID4065028 |
- InChI: InChI=1S/B.3BrH/h;3*1H/q+3;;;/p-3 Key: LKBREHQHCVRNFR-UHFFFAOYSA-K; InChI=1/BBr3/c2-1(3)4 Key: ILAHWRKJUDSMFH-UHFFFAOYAA; InChI=1/B.3BrH/h;3*1H/q+3;;;/p-3 Key: LKBREHQHCVRNFR-DFZHHIFOAX
- SMILES: BrB(Br)Br

Properties
| Chemical formula | BBr_{3} |
| Molar mass | 250.52 g·mol^{−1} |
| Appearance | Colorless (pure) to amber (typical; color from elemental bromine) liquid |
| Odor | Sharp and irritating |
| Density | 2.643 g/cm^{3} |
| Melting point | −46.3 °C (−51.3 °F; 226.8 K) |
| Boiling point | 91.3 °C (196.3 °F; 364.4 K) |
| Solubility in water | Reacts violently with water and other protic solvents |
| Solubility | Soluble in CH_{2}Cl_{2}, CCl_{4} |
| Vapor pressure | 7.2 kPa (20 °C) |
| Refractive index (n_{D}) | 1.00207 |
| Viscosity | 7.31 × 10^{−4} Pa s (20 °C) |

Thermochemistry
| Heat capacity (C) | 0.2706 J/K |
| Std molar entropy (S^{⦵}_{298}) | 228 J/mol K |
| Std enthalpy of formation (Δ_{f}H^{⦵}_{298}) | −0.8207 kJ/g |

Hazards
- Occupational safety and health (OHS/OSH)
| Main hazards | Reacts violently with water, potassium, sodium, and alcohols; attacks metals, wood, and rubber |
- GHS labelling
| Pictograms | |
| Signal word | Danger |
| Hazard statements | H300, H314, H330 Within the European Union, the following additional hazard statement (EUH014) must also be displayed on labeling: Reacts violently with water. |
| NFPA 704 (fire diamond) | 3 0 2 W |
| Flash point | Noncombustible |
- NIOSH (US health exposure limits)
| PEL (Permissible) | None |
| REL (Recommended) | C 1 ppm (10 mg/m^{3}) |
| IDLH (Immediate danger) | N.D. |
| Safety data sheet (SDS) | ICSC 0230 |

Related compounds
| Related compounds | Boron trifluoride Boron trichloride Boron triiodide |
- Except where otherwise noted, data are given for materials in their standard state (at 25 °C [77 °F], 100 kPa). verify (what is ?) Infobox references

Boron tribromide, BBr_{3}, is a colorless, fuming liquid compound containing boron and bromine. Commercial samples usually are amber to red/brown, due to weak bromine contamination. It is decomposed by water and alcohols.

== Chemical properties ==
Boron tribromide is commercially available and is a strong Lewis acid.

It is an excellent demethylating or dealkylating agent for the cleavage of ethers, also with subsequent cyclization, often in the production of pharmaceuticals.

The mechanism of dealkylation of tertiary alkyl ethers proceeds via the formation of a complex between the boron center and the ether oxygen followed by the elimination of an alkyl bromide to yield a dibromo(organo)borane.

ROR + BBr_{3} → RO^{+}(^{−}BBr_{3})R → ROBBr_{2} + RBr

Aryl methyl ethers (as well as activated primary alkyl ethers), on the other hand are dealkylated through a bimolecular mechanism involving two BBr_{3}-ether adducts.

RO^{+}(^{−}BBr_{3})CH_{3} + RO^{+}(^{−}BBr_{3})CH_{3} → RO(^{−}BBr_{3}) + CH_{3}Br + RO^{+}(BBr_{2})CH_{3}

The dibromo(organo)borane can then undergo hydrolysis to give a hydroxyl group, boric acid, and hydrogen bromide as products.

ROBBr_{2} + 3H_{2}O → ROH + B(OH)_{3} + 2HBr

It also finds applications in olefin polymerization and in Friedel-Crafts chemistry as a Lewis acid catalyst.

The electronics industry uses boron tribromide as a boron source in pre-deposition processes for doping in the manufacture of semiconductors. Boron tribromide also mediates the dealkylation of aryl alkyl ethers, for example demethylation of 3,4-dimethoxystyrene into 3,4-dihydroxystyrene.

== Synthesis ==
The reaction of boron carbide with bromine at temperatures above 300 °C leads to the formation of boron tribromide. The product can be purified by vacuum distillation.

== History ==
The first synthesis was done by Poggiale in 1846 by reacting boron trioxide with carbon and bromine at high temperatures:

B_{2}O_{3} + 3 C + 3 Br_{2} → 2 BBr_{3} + 3 CO

An improvement of this method was developed by F. Wöhler and Deville in 1857. By starting from amorphous boron the reaction temperatures are lower and no carbon monoxide is produced:

2 B + 3 Br_{2} → 2 BBr_{3}

== Applications ==
Boron tribromide is used in organic synthesis, pharmaceutical manufacturing, image processing, semiconductor doping, semiconductor plasma etching, and photovoltaic manufacturing.

== See also ==
- List of highly toxic gases
