= Cyclotriveratrylene =

Names
- Preferred IUPAC name 2,3,7,8,12,13-Hexamethoxy-10,15-dihydro-5H-tribenzo[a,d,g][9]annulene

Identifiers
CAS Number	1180-60-5
3D model (JSmol)	Interactive image
ChemSpider	240862
PubChem CID	273730
UNII	N3F2J3T2ZN
CompTox Dashboard (EPA)	DTXSID40297912
- InChI: InChI=1S/C27H30O6/c1-28-22-10-16-7-18-12-24(30-3)26(32-5)14-20(18)9-21-15-27(33-6)25(31-4)13-19(21)8-17(16)11-23(22)29-2/h10-15H,7-9H2,1-6H3 Key: YECHEDVCXXVLIY-UHFFFAOYSA-N; InChI=1/C27H30O6/c1-28-22-10-16-7-18-12-24(30-3)26(32-5)14-20(18)9-21-15-27(33-6)25(31-4)13-19(21)8-17(16)11-23(22)29-2/h10-15H,7-9H2,1-6H3 Key: YECHEDVCXXVLIY-UHFFFAOYAY
- SMILES: O(c1cc4c(cc1OC)Cc2c(cc(OC)c(OC)c2)Cc3c(cc(OC)c(OC)c3)C4)C

Properties
Chemical formula	C_{27}H_{30}O_{6}
Molar mass	450.531 g·mol^{−1}
Melting point	234 °C (453 °F; 507 K)
- Except where otherwise noted, data are given for materials in their standard state (at 25 °C [77 °F], 100 kPa). Infobox references

Cyclotriveratrylene (CTV) is an organic compound with the formula [C_{6}H_{2}(OCH_{3})_{2}CH_{2}]_{3}. It is a white solid that is soluble in organic solvents. The compound is a macrocycle and used in host–guest chemistry as a molecular host.

== Synthesis ==
The compound can be synthesised from veratrole alcohol upon acid catalysis.

Operating via the same intermediates, an alternative synthesis involves the acid-catalyzed reaction of veratrole and formaldehyde. The method is similar to the reactions that give phenol formaldehyde resins except that the degree of polymerization is moderated by the methoxy substituents.

== Host–guest behavior ==
CTV has a bowl shaped conformation, giving the molecule C_{3} symmetry. The ether groups are situated at the upper rim, but in contrast a crown ether typically do not interact with guests. The compound is related to calixarenes in terms of its host–guest properties and its synthesis

CTV derivates are known to bind fullerenes and the use of CTV's in the separation of mixtures of fullerenes has been demonstrated. They have also been used in the solubilizing and immobilizing of fullerene compounds. CTV derivatives are also known to form liquid crystals and they are used as structural units for polymer networks (gels) and polymers. With suitable metal complexes CTV's can form metallo-supramolecular oligomers or polymers.

When two CTV units are connected though molecular spacers a molecular box is formed called a cryptophane. Cryptophanes are of interest in molecular encapsulation.

== History ==
CTV was first synthesised by Gertrude Robinson in 1915 but misdiagnosed as the dimer. In 1965, Lindsey identified the correct structure and coined cyclotriveratrylene as the name for the compound.
