= Veratrole alcohol =

- Veratrole alcohol

Names
- Preferred IUPAC name (3,4-Dimethoxyphenyl)methanol
- Other names Veratryl alcohol 3,4-Dimethoxybenzyl alcohol

Identifiers
CAS Number	93-03-8
3D model (JSmol)	Interactive image
ChemSpider	6851
ECHA InfoCard	100.002.012
PubChem CID	7118
UNII	MB4T4A711H
CompTox Dashboard (EPA)	DTXSID1059076
- InChI: InChI=1S/C9H12O3/c1-11-8-4-3-7(6-10)5-9(8)12-2/h3-5,10H,6H2,1-2H3 Key: OEGPRYNGFWGMMV-UHFFFAOYSA-N; InChI=1/C9H12O3/c1-11-8-4-3-7(6-10)5-9(8)12-2/h3-5,10H,6H2,1-2H3 Key: OEGPRYNGFWGMMV-UHFFFAOYAK
- SMILES: O(c1ccc(cc1OC)CO)C

Properties
Chemical formula	C_{9}H_{12}O_{3}
Molar mass	168.192 g·mol^{−1}
Boiling point	296 to 297 °C (565 to 567 °F; 569 to 570 K) 732 Torr
- Except where otherwise noted, data are given for materials in their standard state (at 25 °C [77 °F], 100 kPa). verify (what is ?) Infobox references

Veratrole alcohol (veratryl alcohol) is an organic compound related to veratrole and also to benzyl alcohol. It can be obtained by reduction of veratraldehyde. Veratrole alcohol is the raw material for the synthesis of cyclotriveratrylene which is used in host–guest chemistry. It is a secondary metabolite of some white rot fungi and is believed to play a role in their degradation of lignin.
