= 1,4-Dimethoxybenzene =

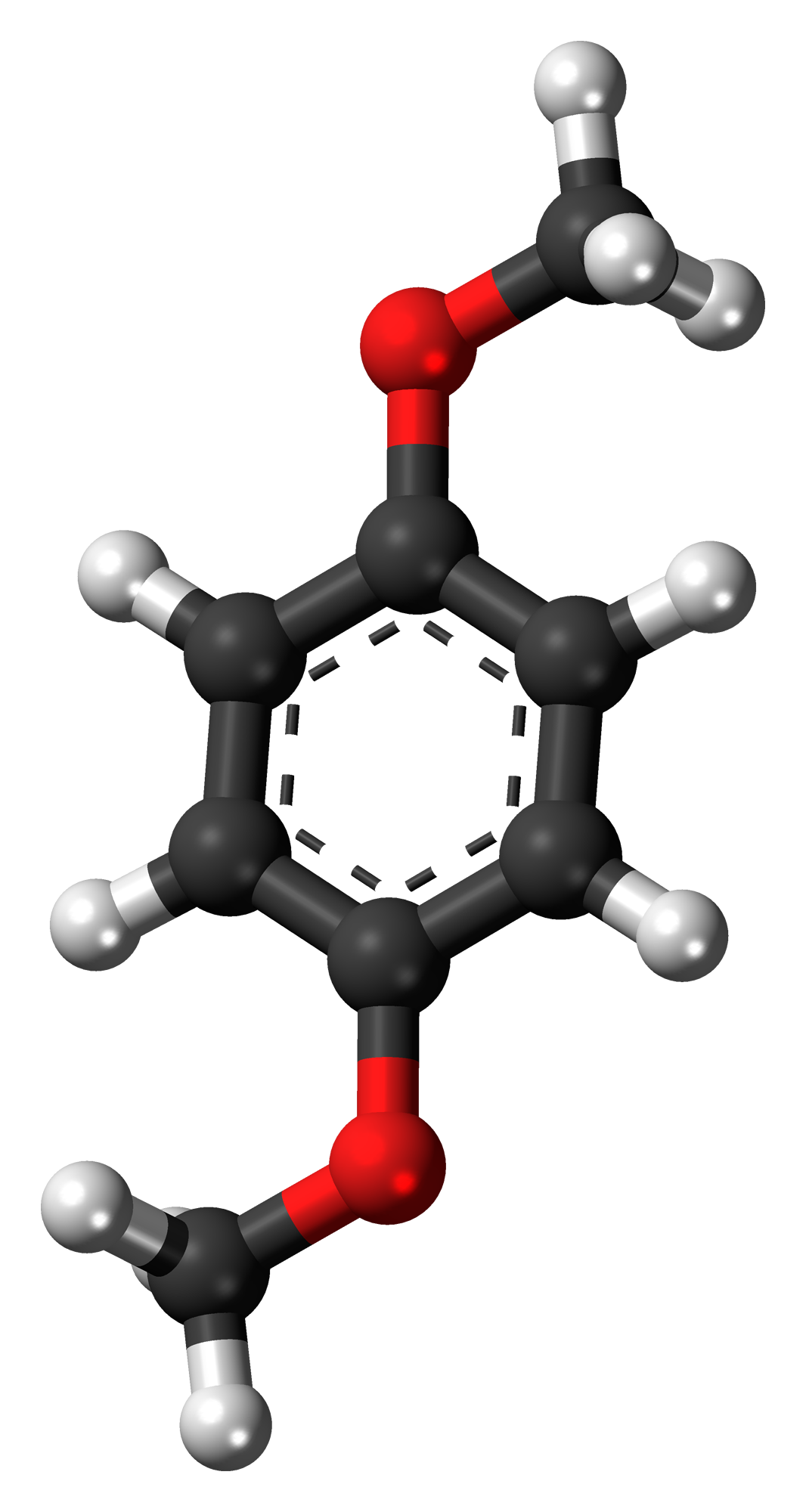

Names
- Preferred IUPAC name 1,4-Dimethoxybenzene
- Other names Hydroquinone dimethyl ether; p-Methoxyanisole; Dimethyl ether hydroquinone; USAF AN-9; Dimethylhydroquinone ether; Quinol dimethyl ether; p-Dimethoxybenzene

Identifiers
CAS Number	150-78-7
3D model (JSmol)	Interactive image
ChEMBL	ChEMBL1668604
ChemSpider	21105878
ECHA InfoCard	100.005.248
EC Number	205-771-9
PubChem CID	9016
RTECS number	CZ6650000
UNII	24WC6T6X0G
CompTox Dashboard (EPA)	DTXSID0022014
- InChI: InChI=1S/C8H10O2/c1-9-7-3-5-8(10-2)6-4-7/h3-6H,1-2H3 Key: OHBQPCCCRFSCAX-UHFFFAOYSA-N
- SMILES: COc1ccc(OC)cc1

Properties
Chemical formula	C_{8}H_{10}O_{2}
Molar mass	138.166 g·mol^{−1}
Appearance	White crystals
Odor	sweet, nut-like
Density	1.035 g/cm^{3}
Melting point	54 to 56 °C (129 to 133 °F; 327 to 329 K)
Boiling point	212.6 °C (414.7 °F; 485.8 K)
Solubility in water	Slightly soluble
Solubility	very soluble in ether, benzene soluble in acetone
log P	2.03
Magnetic susceptibility (χ)	−86.65·10^{−6} cm^{3}/mol
Viscosity	1.04 cP at 65 °C

Structure
Molecular shape	Planar

Hazards
- GHS labelling
Pictograms	(GHS07: Exclamation mark)
Signal word	Warning
Hazard statements	H315, H319, H335
Precautionary statements	P261, P264, P271, P280, P302+P352, P304+P340, P305+P351+P338, P312, P321, P332+P313, P337+P313, P362, P403+P233, P405, P501
Flash point	94 °C (201 °F; 367 K)
Autoignition temperature	795 °C (1,463 °F; 1,068 K)
Explosive limits	1.2-56%

Related compounds
Related compounds	1,2-Dimethoxybenzene; 1,3-Dimethoxybenzene
- Except where otherwise noted, data are given for materials in their standard state (at 25 °C [77 °F], 100 kPa). verify (what is ?) Infobox references

1,4-Dimethoxybenzene is an organic compound with the formula C_{6}H_{4}(OCH_{3})_{2}. It is one of three isomers of dimethoxybenzene. It is a white solid with an intensely sweet floral odor. It is produced by several plant species.

== Occurrence ==
It occurs naturally in willow (Salix), tea, hyacinth, and zucchini (Cucurbita pepo). It appears to attract bees as it has a powerful response in their antenna. In a study in mice, Iranian scientists identified 1,4-dimethoxybenzene as the major psychoactive chemical in musk willow (Salix aegyptiaca) by its ability to cause somnolescence and depressed activity.

== Preparation ==
It is produced by the methylation of hydroquinone using dimethylsulfate and an alkali.

== Uses ==
1,4-Dimethoxybenzene is mainly used in perfumes and soaps.

It is an intermediate in synthesis of organic compounds, including pharmaceuticals such as methoxamine and butaxamine.

=== Niche uses ===
It can be used as a developer in black and white film, and as a base in synthesizing catecholamines and phenethylamines.
