= Cryptophane =

Class of organic compounds

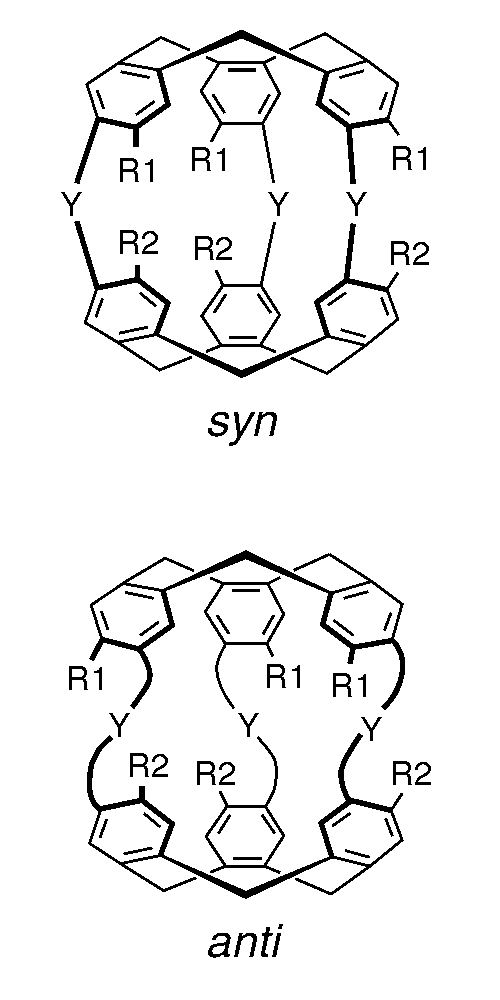
General structure of cryptophanes: syn and anti diastereomeric forms

Cryptophanes are a class of organic supramolecular compounds studied and synthesized primarily for molecular encapsulation and recognition. One possible noteworthy application of cryptophanes is encapsulation and storage of hydrogen gas for potential use in fuel cell automobiles. Cryptophanes can also serve as containers in which organic chemists can carry out reactions that would otherwise be difficult to run under normal conditions. Due to their unique molecular recognition properties, cryptophanes also hold great promise as a potentially new way to study the binding of organic molecules with substrates, particularly as pertaining to biological and biochemical applications.

== Discovery ==
Cryptophanes were discovered by André Collet and Jacqueline Gabard in 1981 when these researchers created, using template-directed synthesis, the first cryptophane, now known as cryptophane-A.

== Structure ==
Cryptophane cages are formed by two cup-shaped [1.1.1]–orthocyclophane units (see cyclotriveratrylene), connected by three bridges (denoted Y). There are also choices of the peripheral substitutes R1 and R2 attached to the aromatic rings of the units. Most cryptophanes exhibit two diastereomeric forms (syn and anti), distinguished by their symmetry type. This general scheme offers a variety of choices (Y, R1, R2, and symmetry type) by which the shape, volume and chemical properties of the generally hydrophobic pocket inside the cage can be modified, making cryptophanes suitable for encapsulating many types of small molecules and even chemical reactions.

== General classification ==
Depending on their structure, cryptophane cages are classified according to the following table.

Classification of known cryptophane structures
Structure			Name		
Bridges Y	R1	R2	anti	syn	described in
3 × O(CX_{2})_{2}O, where X is H or D	OCX_{3}	OCX_{3}	A		Brotin et al.
3 × O(CX_{2})_{2}O	OCH_{2}CO_{2}H	OCH_{2}CO_{2}H	A3		
3 × O(CX_{2})_{2}O	OCH_{3}	H	C	D	
3 × O(CH_{2})_{3}O	OCH_{3}	OCH_{3}	E	F	
3 × O(CH_{2})_{3}O	OCH_{2}CO_{2}H	OCH_{2}CO_{2}H	E3		
3 × O(CH_{2})_{5}O	OCH_{3}	OCH_{3}	O	P	
3 × O(CH_{2})_{5}O	OCH_{2}CO_{2}H	OCH_{2}CO_{2}H	O3		
3 × OCH_{2}C≡CC≡CH_{2}O	CH_{3}	CH_{3}	γ (gamma)	δ (delta)	
2 × O(CH_{2})_{2}O, 1 × O(CH_{2})_{3}O	OCH_{3}	OCH_{3}	223		
2 × O(CH_{2})_{3}O, 1 × O(CH_{2})_{2}O	OCH_{3}	OCH_{3}	233		
2 × O(CH_{2})_{2}O, 1 × O(CH_{2})_{4}O	OCH_{3}	OCH_{3}	224		
