= 1,3-Dimethoxybenzene =

Organic compound

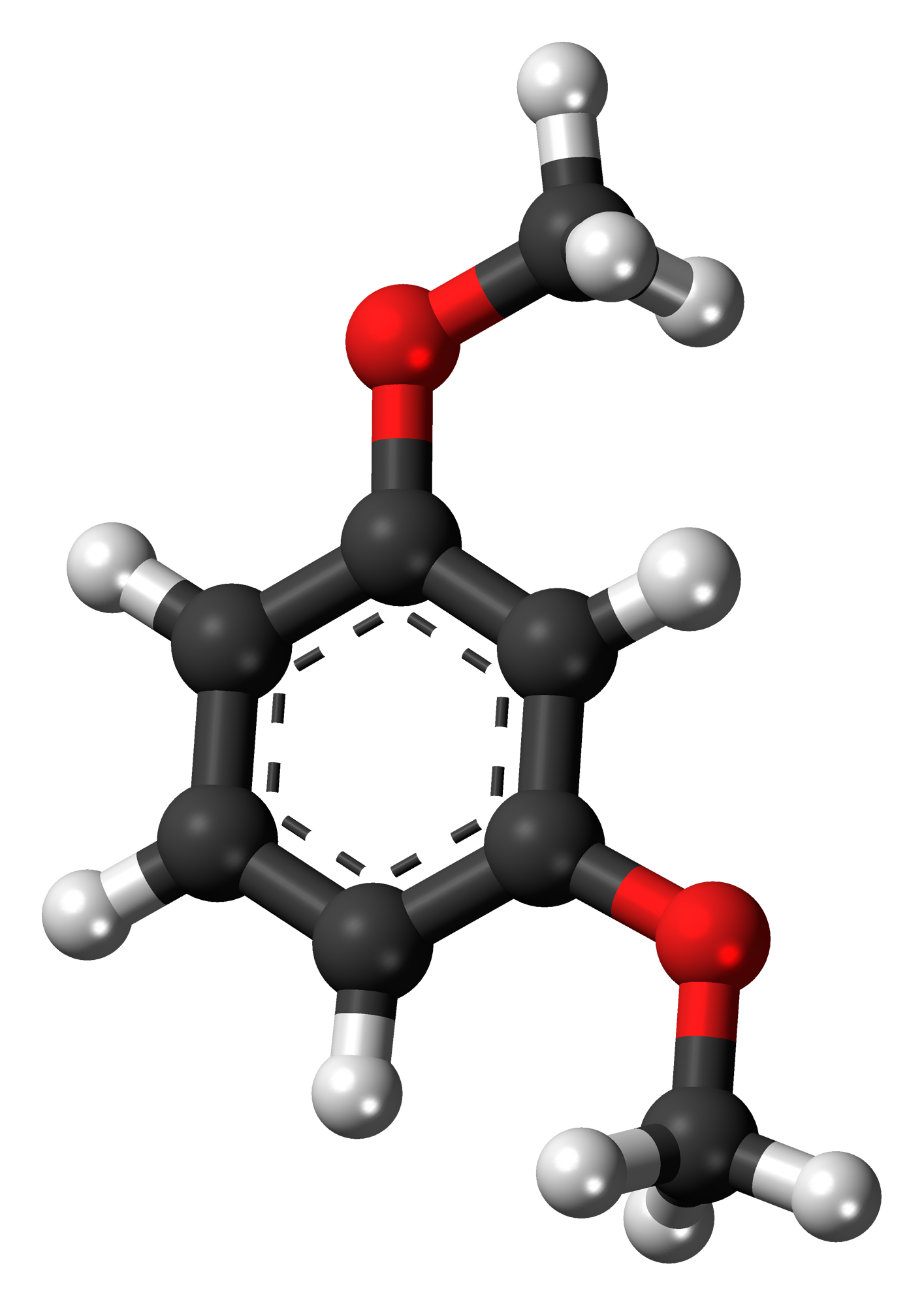

Names
- Preferred IUPAC name 1,3-Dimethoxybenzene
- Other names Dimethylresorcinol; Resorcinol dimethyl ether

Identifiers
| CAS Number | 151-10-0 |
| 3D model (JSmol) | Interactive image |
| ChEBI | CHEBI:89853 |
| ChEMBL | ChEMBL2252486 |
| ChemSpider | 8674 |
| ECHA InfoCard | 100.005.259 |
| EC Number | 205-783-4 |
| PubChem CID | 9025 |
| UNII | 2694Z07HQY |
| CompTox Dashboard (EPA) | DTXSID2047060 |
- InChI: InChI=1S/C8H10O2/c1-9-7-4-3-5-8(6-7)10-2/h3-6H,1-2H3 Key: DPZNOMCNRMUKPS-UHFFFAOYSA-N
- SMILES: COC1=CC(=CC=C1)OC

Properties
| Chemical formula | C_{8}H_{10}O_{2} |
| Molar mass | 138.166 g·mol^{−1} |

Related compounds
| Related compounds | 1,2-Dimethoxybenzene; 1,4-Dimethoxybenzene |
- Except where otherwise noted, data are given for materials in their standard state (at 25 °C [77 °F], 100 kPa). Infobox references

1,3-Dimethoxybenzene is an organic compound with the formula C_{6}H_{4}(OCH_{3})_{2}. It is one of three isomers of dimethoxybenzene.

== Uses ==
1,3-Dimethoxybenzene has been used in the synthesis of novel oxathiane spiroketal donors.

== Related compounds ==
- 1,2-Dimethoxybenzene
- 1,4-Dimethoxybenzene
- Methyl isoeugenol
