= Boron trifluoride etherate =

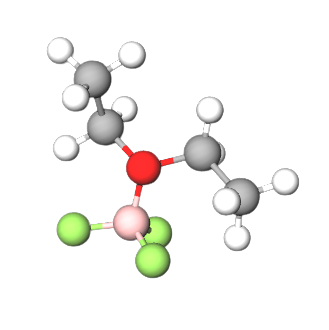

Names
- Other names Boron Trifluoride Ethyl Ether; Boron Trifluoride Diethyl Etherate

Identifiers
CAS Number	109-63-7
3D model (JSmol)	Interactive image
ChEMBL	ChEMBL1710835
ChemSpider	17983029
ECHA InfoCard	100.003.355
PubChem CID	517922
UNII	422VHH19IT
UN number	2604
CompTox Dashboard (EPA)	DTXSID90985377, DTXSID601015537 DTXSID40861733, DTXSID90985377, DTXSID601015537
- InChI: InChI=1S/C4H10O.BF3/c1-3-5-4-2;2-1(3)4/h3-4H2,1-2H3; Key: KZMGYPLQYOPHEL-UHFFFAOYSA-N
- SMILES: B(F)(F)F.CCOCC

Properties
Chemical formula	C_{4}H_{10}BF_{3}O
Molar mass	141.93 g·mol^{−1}
Appearance	colorless liquid
Density	1.15 g cm^{3}
Melting point	−58 °C (−72 °F; 215 K)
Boiling point	126 °C (259 °F; 399 K)

Hazards
- Occupational safety and health (OHS/OSH)
Main hazards	Flammable, Reacts with water, Corrosive
- GHS labelling
Pictograms	(GHS02: Flammable) (GHS05: Corrosive) (GHS06: Toxic) (GHS07: Exclamation mark) (GHS08: Health hazard)
Signal word	Danger
NFPA 704 (fire diamond)	3 2 2 W
Flash point	58.5 °C (137.3 °F; 331.6 K)
- Except where otherwise noted, data are given for materials in their standard state (at 25 °C [77 °F], 100 kPa). Infobox references

Boron trifluoride etherate, strictly boron trifluoride diethyl etherate, or boron trifluoride–ether complex, is the chemical compound with the formula BF_{3}O(C_{2}H_{5})_{2}, often abbreviated BF_{3}OEt_{2} or BF_{3}·OEt_{2}_{.} It is a colorless liquid, although older samples can appear brown. The compound is used as a source of boron trifluoride in many chemical reactions that require a Lewis acid. The compound features tetrahedral boron coordinated to a diethylether ligand. Many analogues are known, including the methanol complex.

== Reactions ==
Boron trifluoride etherate serves as a source of boron trifluoride according to the equilibrium:

BF_{3}OEt_{2} $\ce{<=>>}$ BF_{3} + OEt_{2}

The BF_{3} binds to even weak Lewis bases, inducing reactions of the resulting adducts with nucleophiles.
