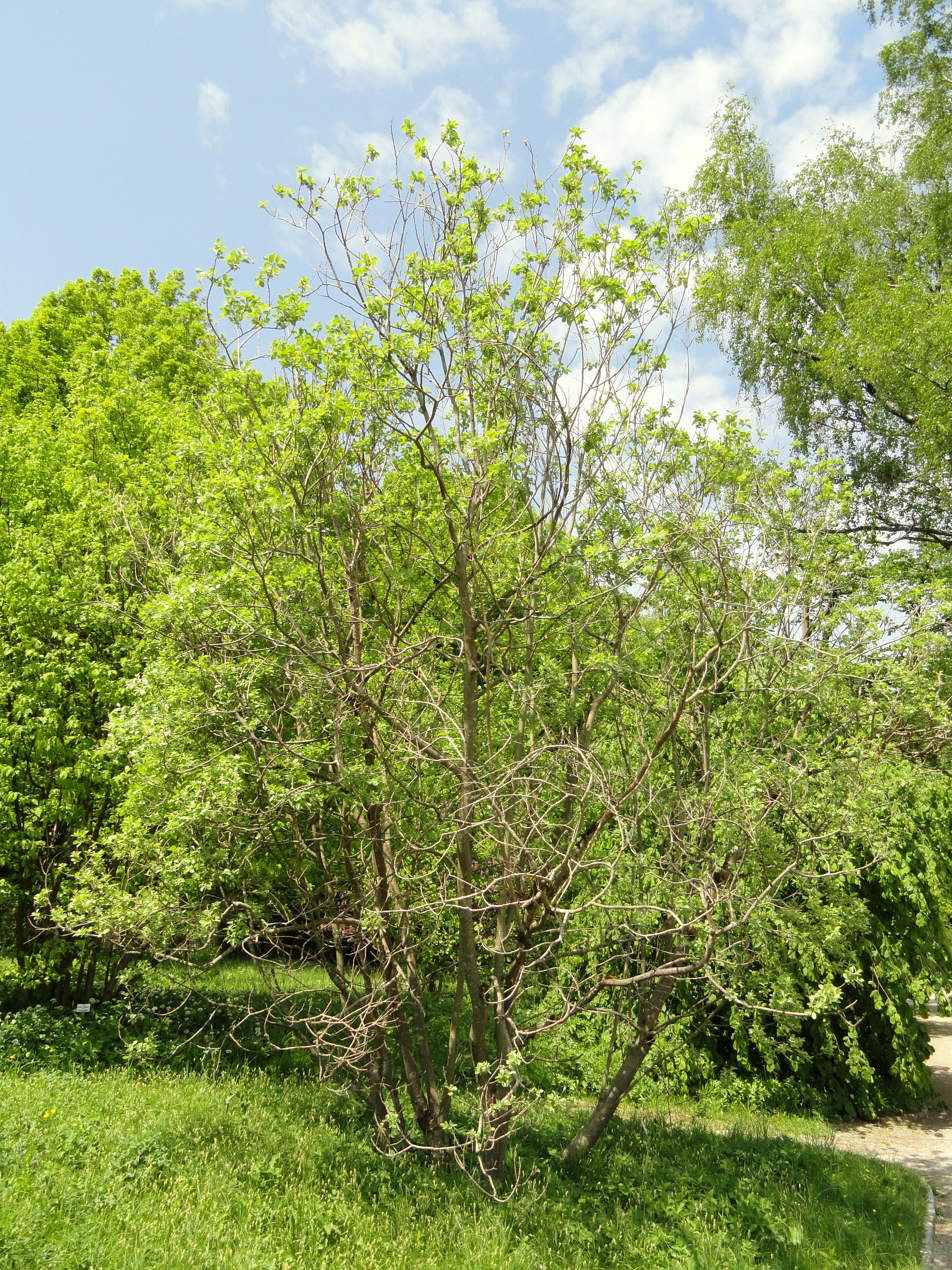
- In the Botanical Garden Munich-Nymphenburg

Scientific classification
- Kingdom: Plantae
- Clade: Tracheophytes
- Clade: Angiosperms
- Clade: Eudicots
- Clade: Rosids
- Order: Malpighiales
- Family: Salicaceae
- Genus: Salix
- Species: S. aegyptiaca

Binomial name
- Salix aegyptiaca L.

= Salix aegyptiaca =

Species of tree; "Persian willow"

Salix aegyptiaca, known as the Persian willow, is a large shrub or small tree from the genus of willow (Salix) with red branches that are tomentose in the first two years and leaves up to 15 centimeters long. The natural range of the species is in the Caucasus and in western Asia. It is cultivated in many countries.

== Description ==
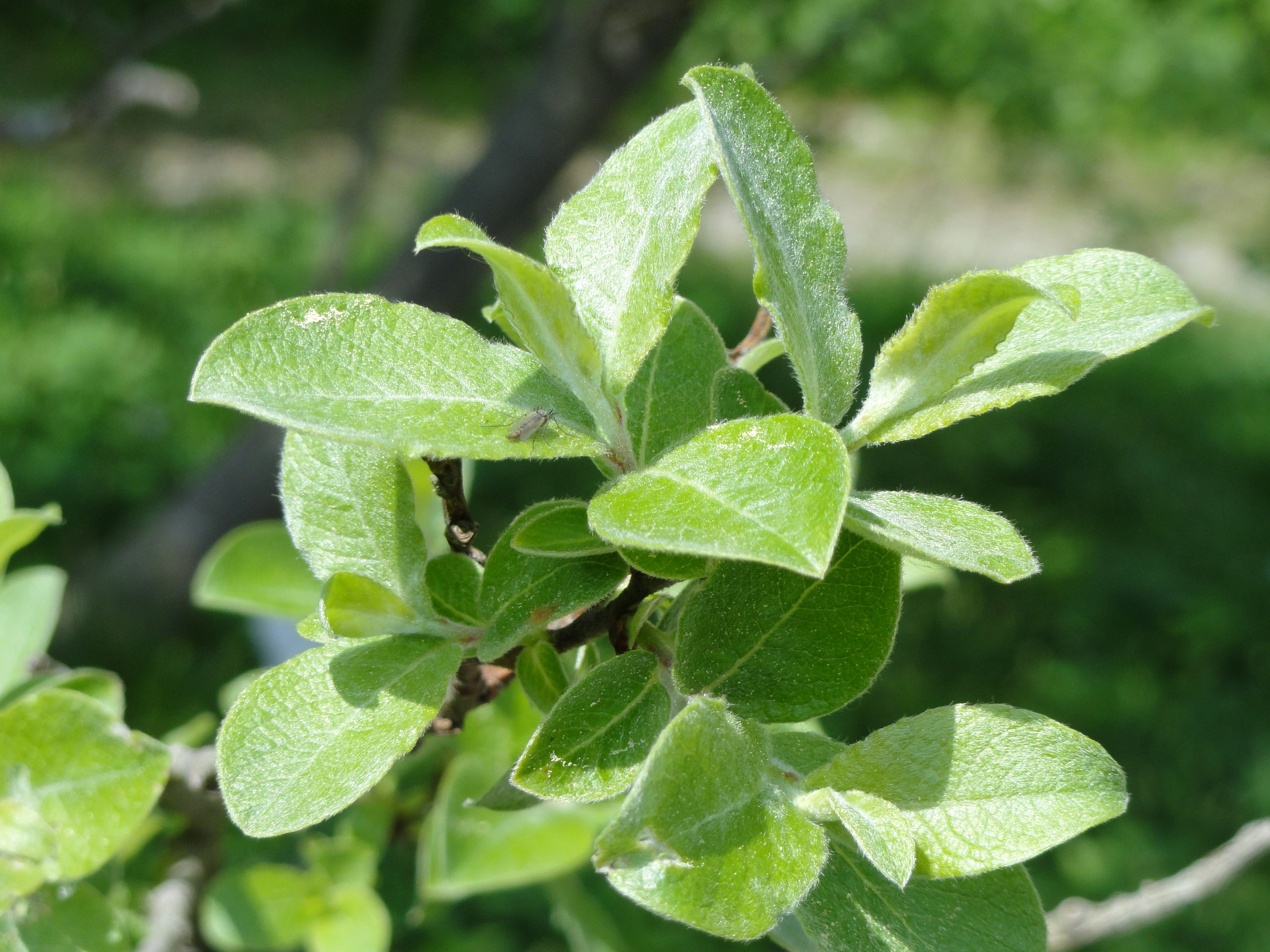
leaves

The Persian willow is a 2.5 to 10 meter high shrub or tree with striped wood. The twigs are thick, red, with gray tomentose hair up to the second year and later glabrous. The flower buds are egg-shaped, 6 to 9 millimeters long, 4 to 6 millimeters in diameter, blunt or pointed. The foliage leaves have kidney-shaped or half- heart -shaped stipules 1.5 to 6 millimeters long, falling off early. The petiole is 4 to 12 millimeters long. The leaf blade is 5 to 15 centimeters long, 3 to 6 centimeters wide, obovate to elliptical-lanceolate, usually half as wide as long, with a pointed or blunt end, a rounded to broadly wedge-shaped base and a more or less wavy and irregularly serrated leaf edge. 15 pairs of nerves are formed. Both sides are initially hairy, the top later becomes bald and is then shiny green. The underside is blue-green and gray haired pressed.

The numerous catkins are up to 8 inches long, cylindrical to ovate, sitting and densely shaggy hairy. They appear even before the leaves shoot. The bracts are hairy silky, 2 to 3.5 millimeters long and 1.5 to 3 millimeters wide. Male flowers have two stamens with 7 to 10 millimeters long, about half-grown and hairy stamens at the base. The ovary of female flowers is stalked and slightly hairy. The Persian willow flowers from March to April.

== Range ==
The natural range is in temperate areas in the north of Iran and Iraq, in the southeast of Turkey and in Azerbaijan. Other sources also state northeast Greece and Israel as the distribution area. It is cultivated in Egypt, Iraq, Afghanistan and Pakistan, and other countries. The species grows in floodplain and bank trees on fresh to moist, acidic to neutral, sandy-gravelly soils in sunny locations. The species loves warmth and is usually frost hardy.

== Systematics ==
Salix aegyptiaca is a species from the genus of willows (Salix) in the willow family (Salicaceae). The species was described in 1759 by Carl Linnaeus. The generic name Salix comes from Latin and was already used by the Romans for various types of willow. The specific epithet aegyptiaca refers to the country Egypt, although the willow is not native there. A synonym of the species is Salix medemii Boiss.

== Use ==
The wood of the Persian willow is rarely used. It is sometimes used as an ornamental shrub because of the decorative flowers.

Its flowers can be infused in a syrup or be distilled like rose water. Musk willow water and syrup are used in Egyptian and Persian cuisines to flavour drinks, pastries and candies.

== Literature ==
- Syed Irtifaq Ali: Flora of Pakistan 203: Salicaceae. Ed.: University of Karachi, Department of Botany. Karachi 2001.
- Andreas Roloff, Andreas Bärtels: Flora of the woods. Purpose, properties and use. With a winter key from Bernd Schulz. 3rd, corrected edition. Eugen Ulmer, Stuttgart (Hohenheim) 2008, ISBN 978-3-8001-5614-6, pp. 573-574.
- Jost Fitschen: Woody flora. 12th, revised and expanded edition. Quelle & Meyer, Wiebelsheim 2007, ISBN 3-494-01422-1, p. 769.
- Helmut Genaust: Etymological dictionary of botanical plant names. 3rd, completely revised and expanded edition. Nikol, Hamburg 2005, ISBN 3-937872-16-7 (reprint from 1996).
