= Chemoprotective agent =

A chemo-protective agent is any drug that helps to reduce the side-effects of chemotherapy. These agents protect specific body parts from harmful anti-cancer treatments that could potentially cause permanent damage to important bodily tissues. Chemo-protective agents have only recently been introduced as a factor involved with chemotherapy with the intent to assist those cancer patients that require treatment, which as an result, improves the patients' quality of life.

Amifostine; A common chemo-protective agent that has been approved by the FDA.

Examples include:

- Amifostine, approved by the FDA in 1995, which helps prevent kidney damage in patients undergoing cisplatin and carboplatin chemotherapy
- Mesna, approved by the FDA in 1988, which helps prevent hemorrhagic cystitis (bladder bleeding) in patients undergoing cyclophosphamide or ifosfamide chemotherapy
- Dexrazoxane, approved by the FDA in 1995, which helps prevent heart problems in patients undergoing doxorubicin chemotherapy

== Risks ==
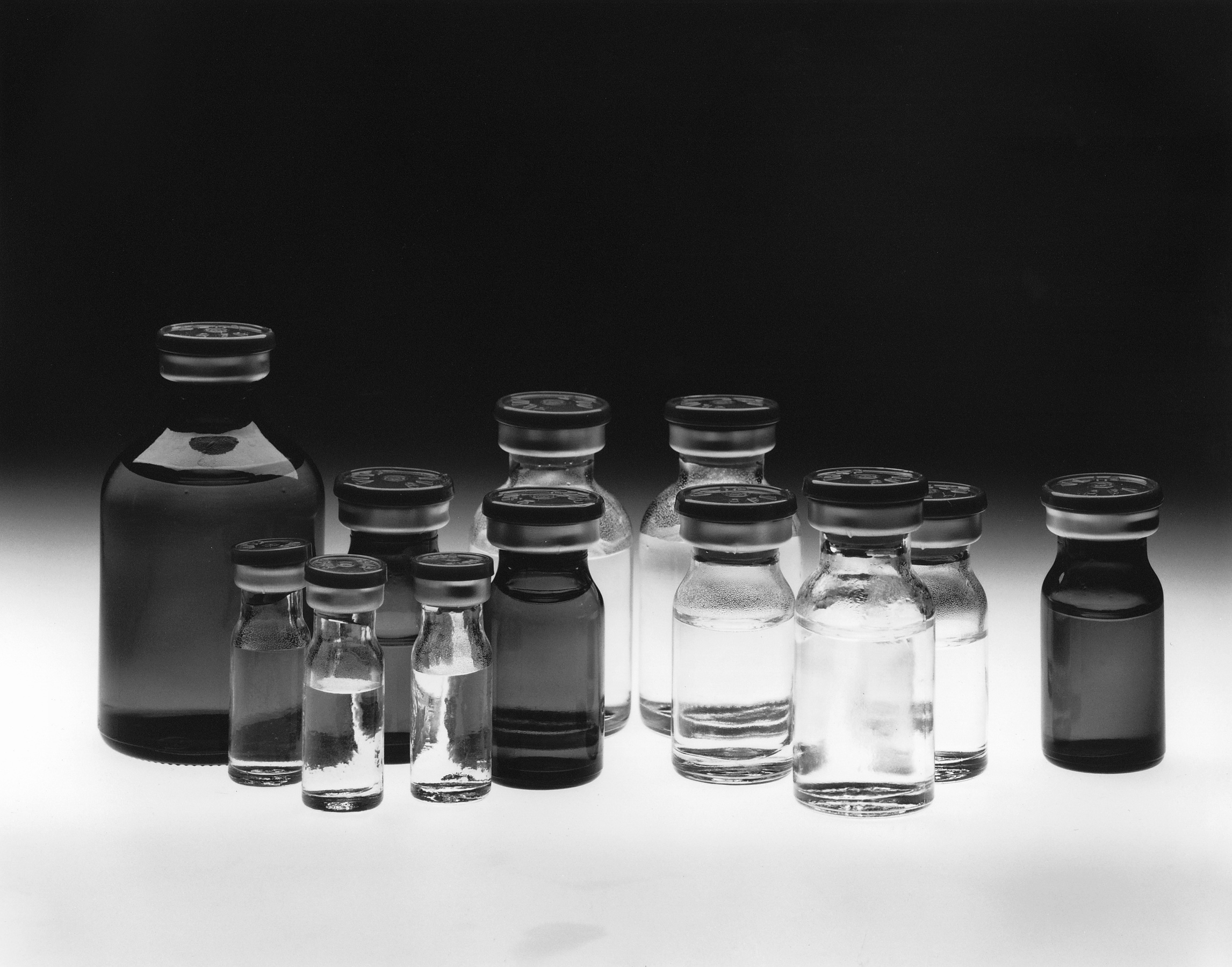
Chemo-protective agents are used to combat the negative effects of the chemotherapeutic medicine shown above.

Chemo-protective agents are common drugs and like many other drugs, may have side effects of their own. Each agent has different side effects though the most common consist of dizziness, sleepiness, nausea, fever, etc. It is important to discuss the side effects of these drugs with a doctor before using them to combat any type of chemotherapy to ensure the drug will benefit each and every patient.
