= Oxathiane =

Oxathiane is a saturated heterocyclic compound containing one oxygen, one sulfur and four carbon atoms in a ring. The formula is C_{4}H_{8}OS. There are three isomers:

- 1,2-Oxathiane or o-Oxathiane
- 1,3-Oxathiane or m-Oxathiane
- 1,4-Oxathiane or p-Oxathiane the most important
