= Carbon film (technology) =

Carbon films are thin film coatings which consist predominantly of the chemical element carbon. They include plasma polymer films, amorphous carbon films (diamond-like carbon, DLC), CVD diamond films as well as graphite films.

Carbon films are produced by deposition using gas-phase deposition processes, in most cases taking place in a vacuum: chemical vapor deposition, CVD or physical vapor deposition, PVD. They are deposited in the form of thin films with film thicknesses of just a few micrometres.

Carbon films make it possible to implement a large number of surface functions, especially in the field of tribology - in other words, in applications where wear is a major factor.
