= Anti-proliferation =

Anti-proliferation may refer to:

- Antiproliferation, inhibiting cell proliferation
  - Cytostasis, the inhibition of cell proliferation
- Counterproliferation, efforts to combat the proliferation of weapons
