= International Chemical Safety Cards =

Format of safety information

International Chemical Safety Cards (ICSC) are data sheets intended to provide essential safety and health information on chemicals in a clear and concise way. The primary aim of the Cards is to promote the safe use of chemicals in the workplace and the main target users are therefore workers and those responsible for occupational safety and health. The ICSC project is a joint venture between the World Health Organization (WHO) and the International Labour Organization (ILO) with the cooperation of the European Commission (EC). This project began during the 1980s with the objective of developing a product to disseminate the appropriate hazard information on chemicals at the workplace in an understandable and precise way.

The Cards are prepared in English by ICSC participating institutions and peer reviewed in semiannual meetings before being made public. Subsequently, national institutions translate the Cards from English into their native languages and these translated Cards are also published on the Web. The English collection of ICSC is the original version. To date approximately 1700 Cards are available in English. Translated versions of the Cards currently exist in these 17 different languages: Chinese, Finnish, French, German, Hebrew, Hungarian, Italian, Japanese, Korean, Persian, Polish, Portuguese, Russian, Serbian, Spanish, Swedish and Turkish.

The objective of the ICSC project is to make essential health and safety information on chemicals available to as wide an audience as possible, especially at the workplace level. The project aims to keep on improving the mechanism for the preparation of Cards in English as well as increasing the number of translated versions available; therefore, welcomes the support of additional institutions who could contribute not only to the preparation of ICSC but also to the translation process.

== Format ==
ICSC cards follow a fixed format which is designed to give a consistent presentation of the information, and is sufficiently concise to be printed onto two sides of a harmonized sheet of paper, an important consideration to permit easy use in the workplace.

The standard sentences and consistent format used in ICSC facilitates the preparation and computer-aided translation of the information in the Cards.

== Identification of chemicals ==
The identification of the chemicals on the Cards is based on the UN numbers, the Chemical Abstracts Service (CAS) number and the Registry of Toxic Effects of Chemical Substances (RTECS/NIOSH) numbers. It is thought that the use of those three systems assures the most unambiguous method of identifying the chemical substances concerned, referring as it does to numbering systems that consider transportation matters, chemistry and occupational health.

The ICSC project is not intended to generate any sort of classification of chemicals. It makes reference to existing classifications. As an example, the Cards cite the results of the deliberations of the UN Committee of Experts on the Transport of Dangerous Goods with respect to transport: the UN hazard classification and the UN packaging group, when they exist, are entered on the Cards. Moreover, the ICSC are so-designed that room is reserved for the countries to enter information of national relevance.

== Preparation ==
The preparation of ICSC is an ongoing process of drafting and peer reviewing by a group of scientists working for a number of specialized scientific institutions concerned with occupational health and safety in different countries.

Chemicals are selected for new ICSC based on a range of criteria for concern (high production volume, incidence of health problems, high risk properties). Chemicals can be proposed by countries or stakeholder groups such as trade unions.

ICSC are drafted in English by participating institutions based on publicly available data, and are then peer reviewed by the full group of experts in biannual meetings before being made publicly available. Existing Cards are updated periodically by the same drafting and peer review process, in particular when significant new information becomes available.

In this way approximately 50 to 100 new and updated ICSC become available each year and the collection of Cards available has grown from a few hundreds during the 1980s up to more than 1700 today.

== Authoritative nature ==
The international peer review process followed in the preparation of ICSC ensures the authoritative nature of the Cards and represents a significant asset of ICSC as opposed to other packages of information.

ICSC have no legal status and may not meet all requirements included in national legislation. The Cards should complement any available Chemical Safety Data Sheet but cannot be a substitute for any legal obligation on a manufacturer or employer to provide chemical safety information. However, it is recognized that ICSC might be the principal source of information available for both management and workers in less developed countries or in small and medium-sized enterprises.

In general, the information provided in the Cards is in line with the ILO Chemicals Convention (No. 170) and Recommendation (No. 177), 1990; the European Union Council Directive 98/24/EC; and the United Nations Globally Harmonized System of Classification and Labelling of Chemicals (GHS) criteria.

== Globally Harmonized System of Classification and Labelling of Chemicals (GHS) ==
The Globally Harmonized System of Classification and Labelling of Chemicals (GHS) is now being widely used for the classification and labelling of chemicals worldwide. One of the aims of introducing the GHS was to make it easier for users to identify chemical hazards in the workplace in a more consistent way.

GHS classifications have been added to new and updated ICSC since 2006 and the language and technical criteria underlying the standard phrases used in the Cards has been developed to reflect ongoing developments in the GHS to ensure consistent approaches. The addition of GHS classifications to ICSC has been recognized by the relevant United Nations committee as a contribution to assisting countries to implement the GHS, and as a way of making GHS classifications of chemicals available to a wider audience.

== Material Safety Data Sheets (MSDS) ==
Great similarities exist between the various headings of the ICSC and the manufacturers' Safety Data Sheet (SDS) or Material Safety Data Sheet (MSDS) of the International Council of Chemical Associations.

However, MSDS and the ICSC are not the same. The MSDS, in many instances, may be technically very complex and too extensive for shop floor use, and secondly it is a management document. The ICSC, on the other hand, set out peer-reviewed information about substances in a more concise and simple manner.

This is not to say that the ICSC should be a substitute for an MSDS; nothing can replace management's responsibility to communicate with workers on the exact chemicals, the nature of those chemicals used on the shop floor and the risk posed in any given workplace.

Indeed, the ICSC and the MSDS can even be thought of as complementary. If the two methods for hazard communication can be combined, then the amount of knowledge available to the safety representative or shop floor workers will be more than doubled.
