= 3,4-Dihydroxystyrene =

Chemical compound

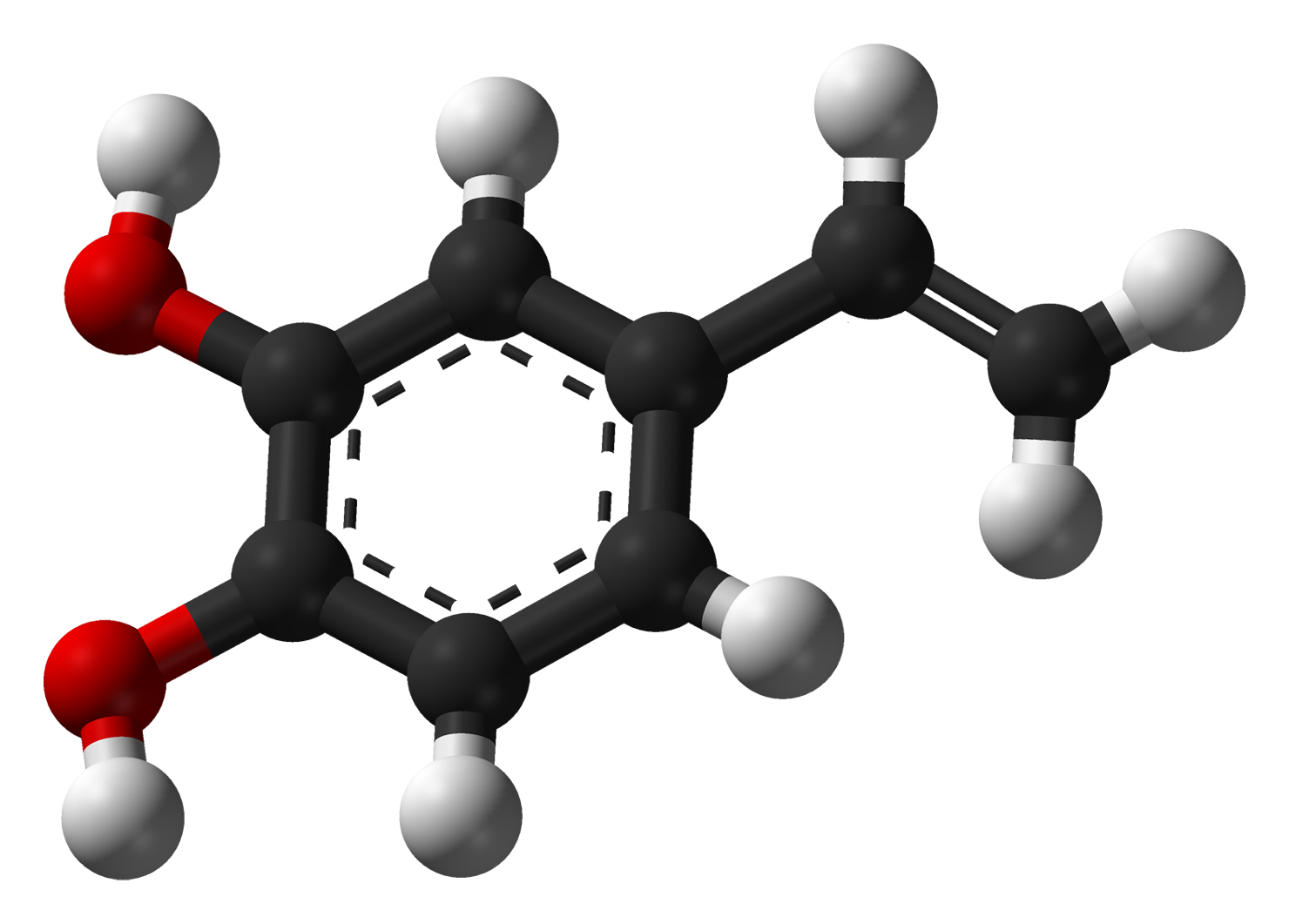

Clinical data
- ATC code: none

Legal status
- Legal status: In general: uncontrolled

Identifiers
- IUPAC name: 4-Ethenylbenzene-1,2-diol
- CAS Number: 6053-02-7
- PubChem CID: 151398
- ChemSpider: 133430
- UNII: 28C0I29E70
- KEGG: C06224
- CompTox Dashboard (EPA): DTXSID20209275

Chemical and physical data
- Formula: C_{8}H_{8}O_{2}
- Molar mass: 136.150 g·mol^{−1}
- 3D model (JSmol): Interactive image
- SMILES: Oc1ccc(\C=C)cc1O
- InChI: InChI=1S/C8H8O2/c1-2-6-3-4-7(9)8(10)5-6/h2-5,9-10H,1H2; Key:FBTSUTGMWBDAAC-UHFFFAOYSA-N

3,4-Dihydroxystyrene (DHS) is a centrally-acting inhibitor of the enzyme phenylalanine hydroxylase (PH). It is likely that DHS and other PH inhibitors will never have clinical applications on account of their capacity for inducing hyperphenylalaninemia and phenylketonuria.

== See also ==
- Phenylalanine hydroxylase
