= Dimethoxybenzene =

In organic chemistry, dimethoxybenzene is an organic compound which is derived from benzene (C_{6}H_{6}) by substituting two methoxy groups (−OCH_{3}). Dimethoxybenzene comes in three structural isomers:

- 1,2-Dimethoxybenzene (Veratrole)
- 1,3-Dimethoxybenzene
- 1,4-Dimethoxybenzene

Common names	Veratrole		
Systematic Name	1,2-Dimethoxybenzene	1,3-Dimethoxybenzene	1,4-Dimethoxybenzene
Structural Formula			
CAS Registry Number	91-16-7	151-10-0	150-78-7

All isomers share the molecular weight 138.17 g/mol and the chemical formula C_{8}H_{10}O_{2}.
