= Trigonal planar molecular geometry =

Molecular geometry of symmetry D_3h

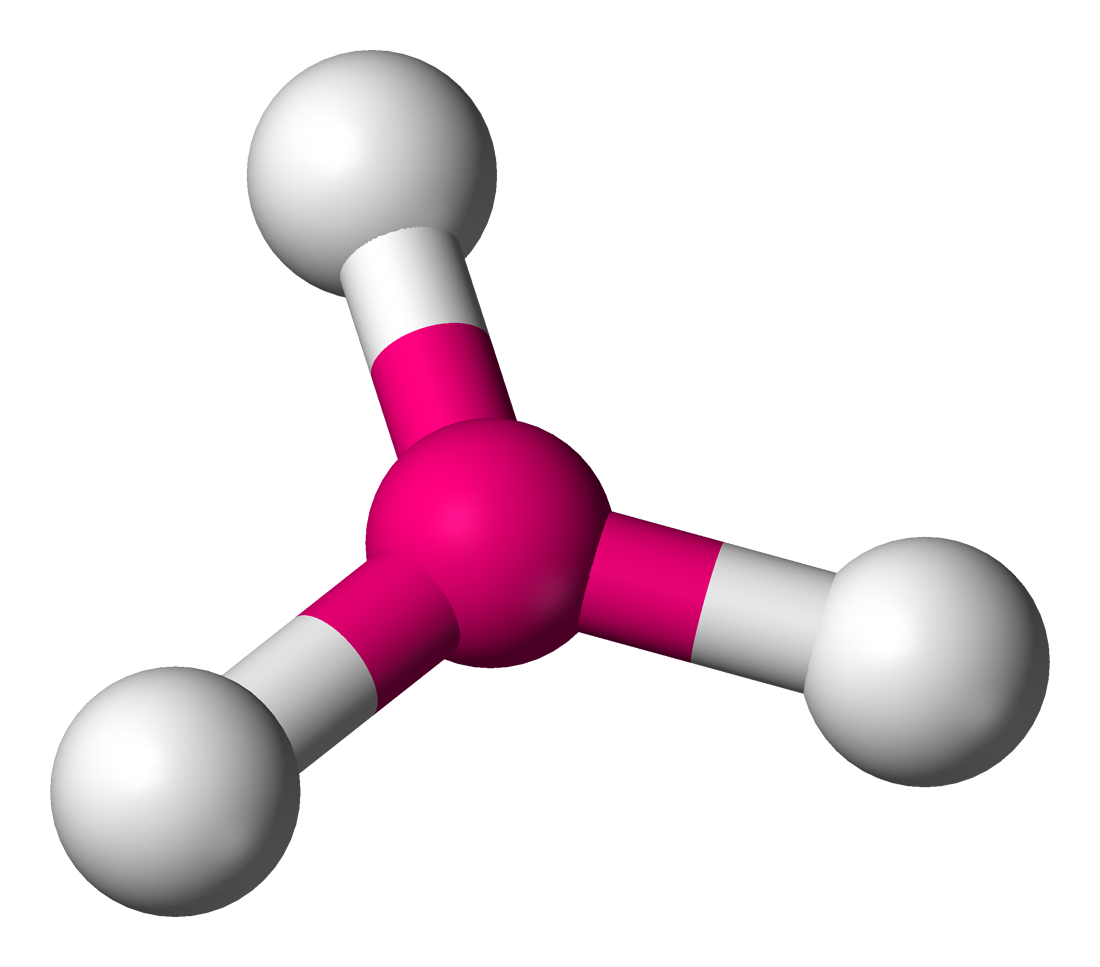
- Examples: SO_{3}
- Point group: D_{3h}
- Coordination number: 3
- Bond angle(s): 120°
- μ (Polarity): 0

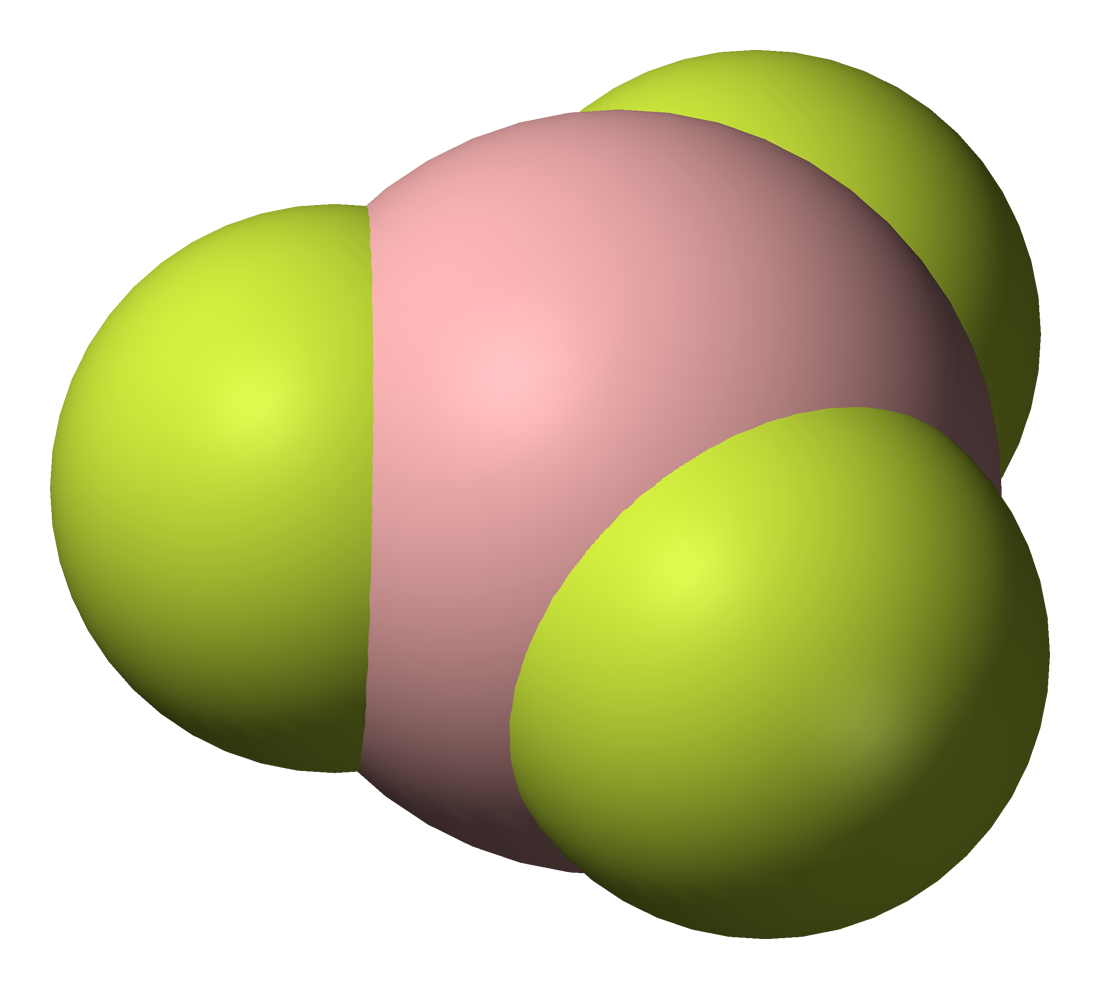
Structure of boron trifluoride, an example of a molecule with trigonal planar geometry.

In chemistry, trigonal planar is a molecular geometry model with one atom at the center and three atoms at the corners of an equilateral triangle, called peripheral atoms, all in one plane. In an ideal trigonal planar species, all three ligands are identical and all bond angles are 120°. Such species belong to the point group D_{3h}. Molecules where the three ligands are not identical, such as H_{2}CO, deviate from this idealized geometry. Examples of molecules with trigonal planar geometry include boron trifluoride (BF_{3}), formaldehyde (H_{2}CO), phosgene (COCl_{2}), and sulfur trioxide (SO_{3}). Some ions with trigonal planar geometry include nitrate (NO^{−}_{3}), carbonate (CO^{2−}_{3}), and guanidinium (C(NH_{2})^{+}_{3}). In organic chemistry, planar, three-connected carbon centers that are trigonal planar are often described as having sp^{2} hybridization.

Nitrogen inversion is the distortion of pyramidal amines through a transition state that is trigonal planar.

Pyramidalization is a distortion of this molecular shape towards a trigonal pyramidal molecular geometry.

== See also ==
- AXE method
- Molecular geometry
- VSEPR theory
