= 1,2-Dimethoxybenzene =

- 1,2-Dimethoxybenzene

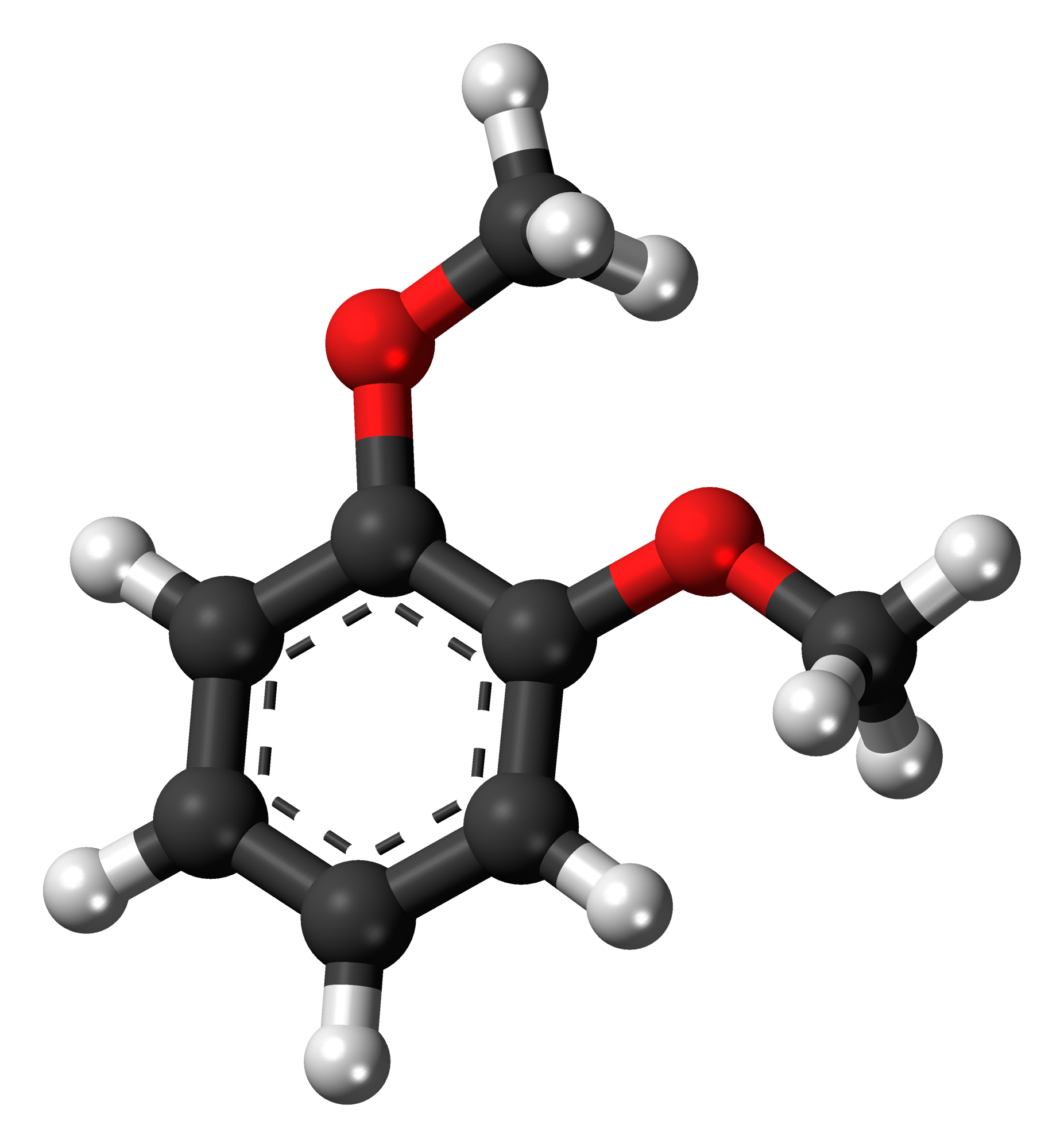

Names
- Preferred IUPAC name 1,2-Dimethoxybenzene
- Other names Veratrole o-Dimethoxybenzene; Pyrocatechol dimethyl ether

Identifiers
CAS Number	91-16-7
3D model (JSmol)	Interactive image
ChEBI	CHEBI:59114
ChEMBL	ChEMBL1668603
ChemSpider	13861009
ECHA InfoCard	100.001.860
EC Number	202-045-3
PubChem CID	7043
UNII	61WJZ2Q41I
CompTox Dashboard (EPA)	DTXSID7047065
- InChI: InChI=1S/C8H10O2/c1-9-7-5-3-4-6-8(7)10-2/h3-6H,1-2H3 Key: ABDKAPXRBAPSQN-UHFFFAOYSA-N; InChI=1/C8H10O2/c1-9-7-5-3-4-6-8(7)10-2/h3-6H,1-2H3 Key: ABDKAPXRBAPSQN-UHFFFAOYAD
- SMILES: COc1ccccc1OC

Properties
Chemical formula	C_{8}H_{10}O_{2}
Molar mass	138.166 g·mol^{−1}
Density	1.084 g/cm^{3}
Melting point	22–23 °C (72–73 °F; 295–296 K)
Boiling point	206–207 °C (403–405 °F; 479–480 K)
Magnetic susceptibility (χ)	−87.39·10^{−6} cm^{3}/mol

Hazards
- GHS labelling
Pictograms	(GHS07: Exclamation mark)
Signal word	Warning
Hazard statements	H302
Precautionary statements	P264, P270, P301+P312, P330, P501
NFPA 704 (fire diamond)	2 2
- Except where otherwise noted, data are given for materials in their standard state (at 25 °C [77 °F], 100 kPa). verify (what is ?) Infobox references

1,2-Dimethoxybenzene, commonly known as veratrole, is an organic compound with the formula C_{6}H_{4}(OCH_{3})_{2}. It is one of three isomers of dimethoxybenzene. It is a colorless liquid, with a pleasant odor and slight solubility in water. It is the dimethyl ether derived from pyrocatechol.

== Occurrence ==
1,2-Dimethoxybenzene is naturally occurring. Its biosynthesis entails the methylation of guaiacol by guaiacol O-methyltransferase. 1,2-Dimethoxybenzene is an insect attractant. Guaiacol O-methyltransferase gene is first scent gene discovered so far in any plant species.

== Uses ==
1,2-Dimethoxybenzene is a building block for the organic synthesis of other aromatic compounds. Veratrole is relatively electron-rich and thus readily undergoes electrophilic substitution.

An example of the use of veratrole is in the synthesis of Domipizone.

Veratrole can easily be brominated with NBS to give 4-bromoveratrole.

== Related compounds ==
- 1,3-Dimethoxybenzene
- 1,4-Dimethoxybenzene
- Methyl isoeugenol
