= Strychnine total synthesis =

Chemical synthesis

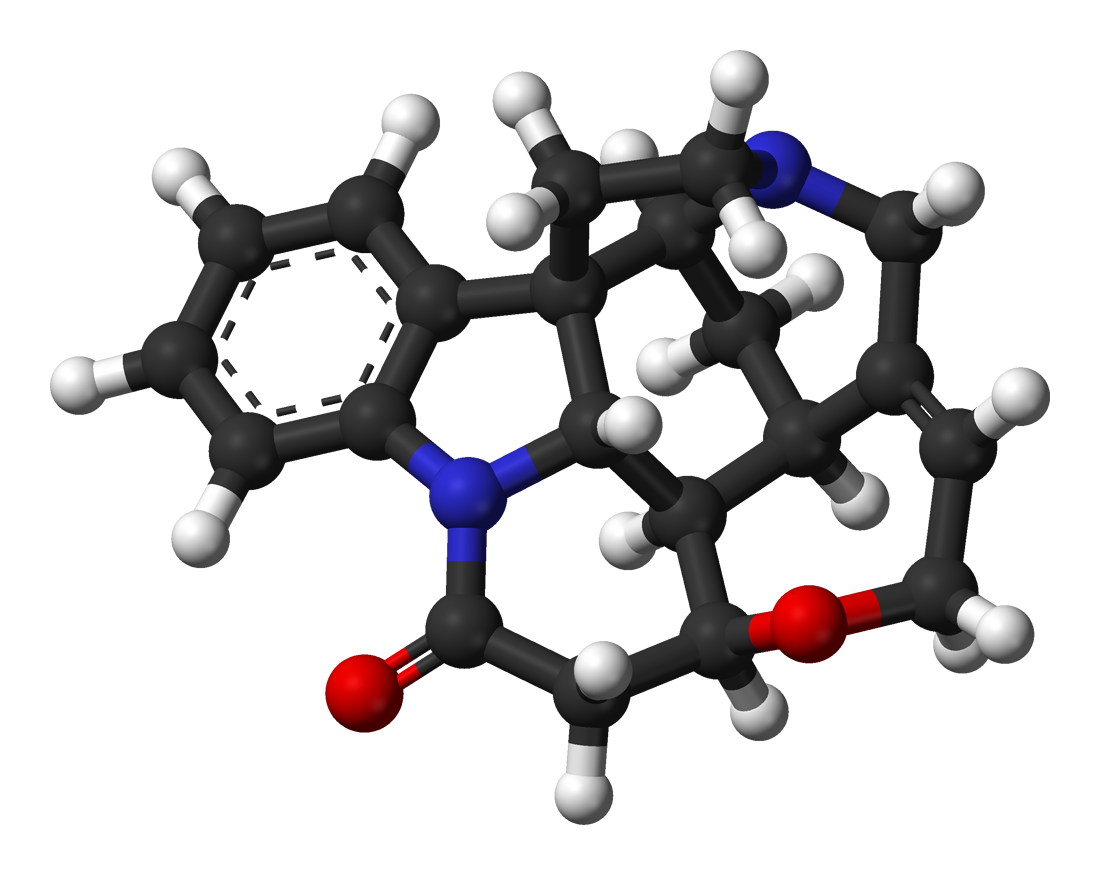
Strychnine ball-and-stick model based on X-ray data

The total synthesis of strychnine in organic chemistry describes the total synthesis of the complex biomolecule strychnine. The synthesis of strychnine has been completed a number of times over the years, beginning with the first reported synthesis by the group of Robert Burns Woodward in 1954. Woodward's synthesis is considered a classic in this research field.

At the time of Woodward's report, the total synthesis symbolized the conclusion of an elaborate process of molecular structure elucidation that began with the isolation of strychnine from the beans of Strychnos ignatii by Pierre Joseph Pelletier and Joseph Bienaimé Caventou in 1818. Major contributors to this effort of structure elucidation were Sir Robert Robinson, with over 250 publications on the topic, and Hermann Leuchs (with another 125) over a span of 40 years. For his efforts, Robinson was awarded the Nobel Prize in Chemistry in 1947 for his work on alkaloids, strychnine included.

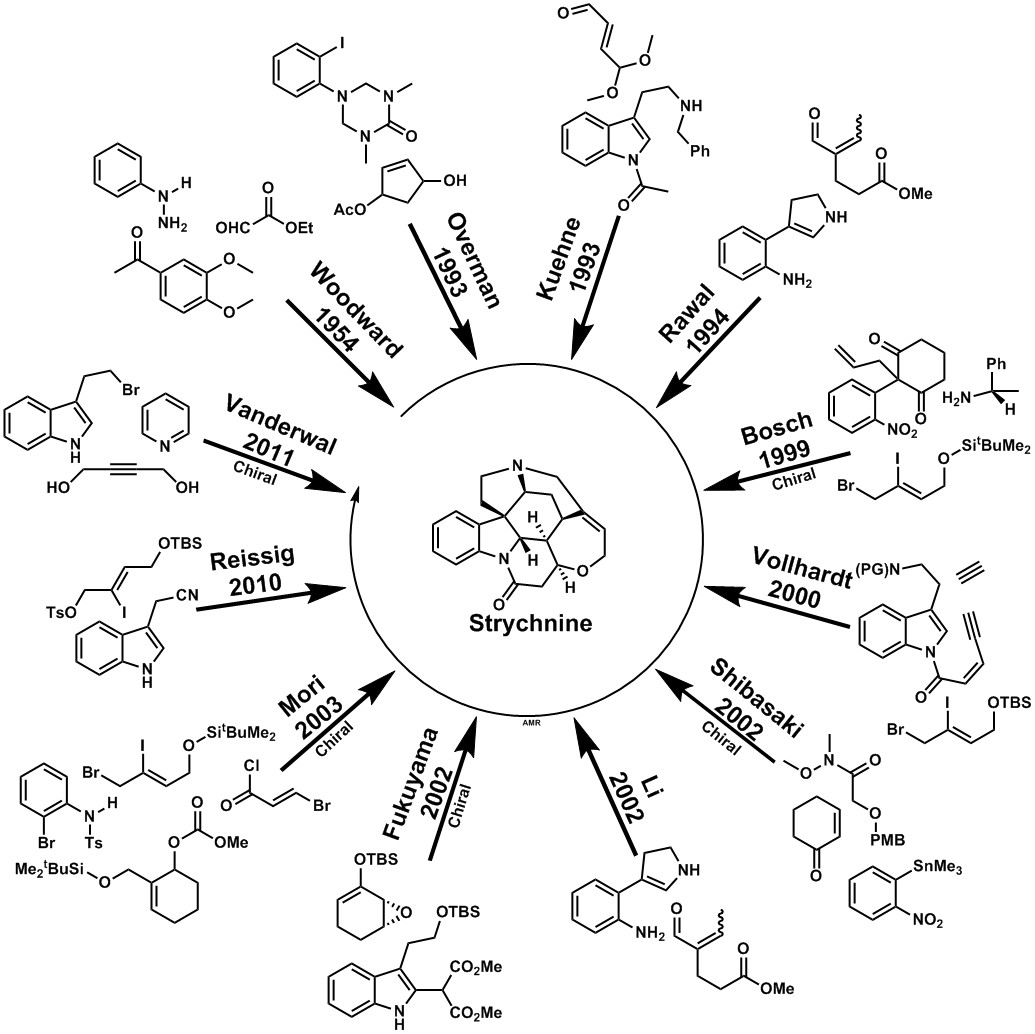
Routes to Strychnine – Many synthetic routes to strychnine have been developed over the years. Some are chiral while others provide a racemic mixture of enantiomers.

The lengthy process of the chemical identification of strychnine was completed in 1946 by Robinson, which was confirmed by Woodward in 1947. X-ray structures establishing the absolute configuration became available between 1947 and 1951 with publications from Johannes Martin Bijvoet and J.H. Robertson

In the years since Woodward's 1954 work, other syntheses of strychnine have been reported by the research groups of Magnus, Overman, Kuehne, Rawal, Bosch, Vollhardt, Mori, Shibasaki, Li, Fukuyama Vanderwal and MacMillan. Synthetic (+)-strychnine is also known. Racemic syntheses were published by Padwa in 2007 and in 2010 by Andrade and by Reissig.

Referring to the alkaloid in his 1963 publication, Woodward quoted Sir Robert Robinson as saying: "...for its molecular size it is the most complex substance known."

== The molecule ==
For simplicity, the ring and structure numbering below will be used throughout the descriptions of the various syntheses.

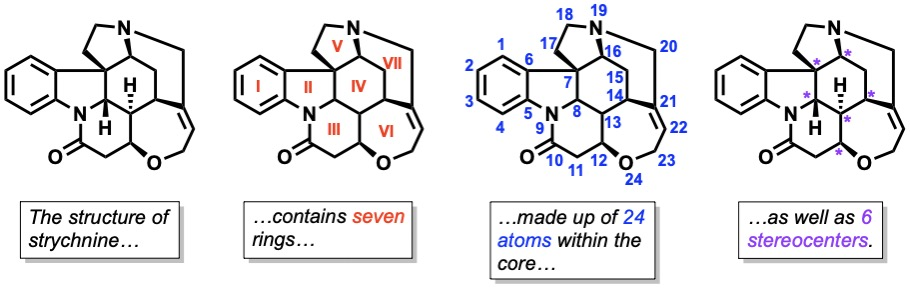

The strychnine molecule (molecular formula C_{21}H_{22}N_{2}O_{2}) is a complex structure, consisting of seven ring systems (numbered I–VII) as well as six stereocenters, all contained within 24 atoms. The molecule also possess a variety of functional groups, an indoline system in addition to a tertiary amine, amide, alkene, and an ether moiety.

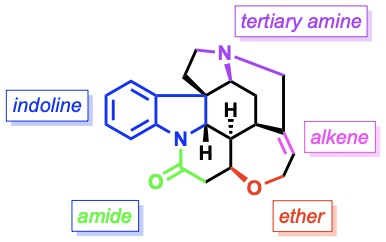

== Woodward synthesis (1954) ==
=== Ring II, V synthesis ===
The synthesis of ring II was accomplished by a Fischer indole synthesis using phenylhydrazine 1 and acetophenone derivative acetoveratrone 2 (using a polyphosphoric acid catalyst) to give the 2-veratrylindole 3. The veratryl group not only blocks the 2-position for further electrophilic substitution, but will also become part of the strychnine skeleton. Mannich reaction of 3 with formaldehyde and dimethylamine produced gramine 4. Alkylation with iodomethane gave an intermediate quaternary ammonium salt which reacted with sodium cyanide in a nucleophilic substitution to nitrile 5 and then in a reduction with lithium aluminium hydride to tryptamine 6. Amine-carbonyl condensation with ethyl glyoxylate give the imine 7. The reaction of this imine with TsCl in pyridine to the ring-closed N-tosyl compound 8 was described by Woodward as a concerted nucleophilic enamine attack, and formally, a Pictet–Spengler reaction. Although compound 8 should form as a diastereomeric pair, only one compound was found; which diastereomer was formed was not investigated. Finally, the newly formed double bond was reduced by sodium borohydride to indoline 9, with the C8 hydrogen atom approaching from the least hindered side.

=== Ring III, IV synthesis ===
Indoline 9 was acetylated to N-acetyl compound 10 using acetic anhydride and pyridine. From here, the veratryl ring was then opened using ozone in aqueous acetic acid to muconic ester 11 (this ring-opening made possible by the two electron-donating methoxide groups). This sequence is considered an example of bioinspired synthesis, proposed by Woodward in 1948. Cleavage of the acetyl group, and ester hydrolysis with HCl in methanol resulted in formation of pyridone ester 12 with additional isomerization of the exocyclic double bond to an endocyclic double bond (losing one asymmetric center in the process). Subsequent treatment with hydrogen iodide and red phosphorus removed the tosyl group and hydrolysed both remaining ester groups to form dicarboxylic acid 13. Acetylation and esterification produced acetyl diester 14, which was then subjected to a Dieckman condensation with sodium methoxide in methanol to enol 15.

=== Ring VII synthesis ===
To remove the C15 alcohol group, enol 15 was converted to tosylate 16 (using TsCl and pyridine) and then to mercaptoester 17 via reaction with sodium benzylmercaptide. Mercaptoester 17 was then reduced to unsaturated ester 18 by reaction of Raney nickel and hydrogen. Further reduction with hydrogen and palladium on carbon afforded saturated ester 19. Alkaline ester hydrolysis of 19 to carboxylic acid 20 was accompanied by epimerization at C14.

Compound 20 was known from earlier strychnine degradation studies. Up to this point in the synthesis, all intermediates were obtained as racemic mixtures, but chirality was introduced at this particular step via chiral resolution using quinidine.

The C20 carbon atom was then introduced by acetic anhydride to form enol acetate 21, and the free aminoketone 22 was obtained by hydrolysis with hydrochloric acid. Ring VII in intermediate 23 was closed by oxidation with selenium dioxide, a process accompanied by epimerization again at C14.

Regarding the formation of 21, this step can be envisioned as a sequence of acylation, deprotonation, and rearrangement with loss of carbon dioxide, followed by a second acylation:

=== Ring VI synthesis ===
To diketone 23, sodium acetylide was added (adding the C22 and C23 carbon atoms) to give alkyne 24. This compound was reduced to the allyl alcohol 25 using Lindlar catalyst, and lithium aluminium hydride removed the remaining amide group to furnish 26. An allylic rearrangement to alcohol 27 (isostrychnine) was achieved by reaction with hydrogen bromide in acetic acid, followed by hydrolysis with sulfuric acid. In the final step, treatment of 27 with ethanol potassium hydroxide resulted in rearrangement of the C12–C13 double bond and subsequent ring closure in a conjugate addition by the hydroxyl anion, resulting in the desired (–)-strychnine product 28.

== Magnus synthesis (1992) ==
Woodward's synthesis of strychnine stood as the only one for nearly four decades. In 1992, Magnus and co-workers reported a new pathway to strychnine via the synthesis of one of its many degradation products, the Wieland-Gumlich aldehyde. Beginning from the aldehyde 1, the "relay compound" 2 was achieved over the course of four reaction steps. This relay compound could be then be transformed into the target strychnine 3 in nine steps.

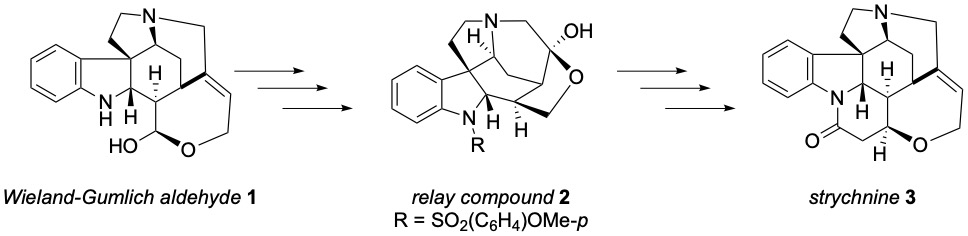

== Overman synthesis (1993) ==
The Overman synthesis of strychnine took a chiral cyclopentene compound 1 as the starting material, obtained by enzymatic hydrolysis of cis-1,4-diacetoxycyclopent-2-ene (not pictured). This starting material was converted in several steps to trialkylstannane 2, which was then coupled to aryl iodide 3 in a Stille reaction using a (tris(dibenzylideneacetone)dipalladium(0) catalyst, triphenylarsine, and carbon monoxide.

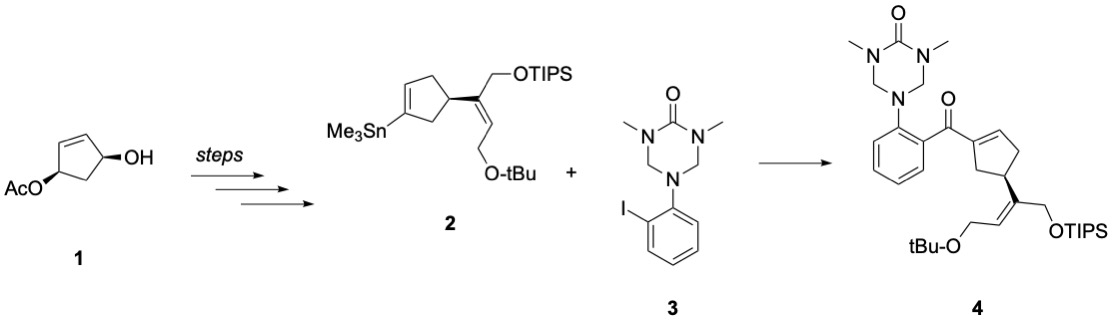

The cyclic alkene in enone 4 was converted to an epoxide using tert-butyl hydroperoxide; the adjacent carbonyl group was then converted to an alkene in a Wittig reaction using Ph_{3}P=CH_{2}, and the TIPS group was hydrolyzed (TBAF) and replaced by a trifluoroacetamide group (NH_{2}COCF_{3}, NaH) resulting in compound 5. Cyclization of 5 using sodium hydride opened the epoxide ring, and the trifluoroacetyl group was removed using potassium hydroxide, affording azabicyclooctane 6.

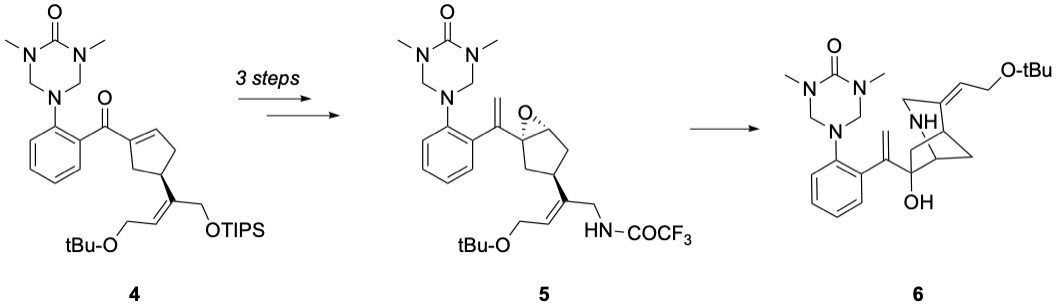

The key step of the synthetic pathway was an aza-Cope-Mannich reaction, initiated by an amine-carbonyl condensation using paraformaldehyde and heating in order to form intermediate 7 in nearly quantitative yield.

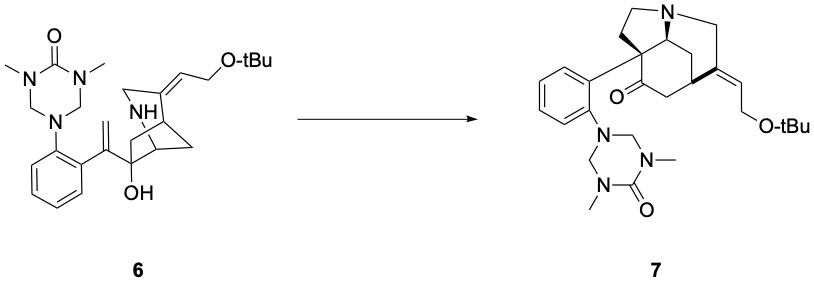

In the closing stages of the synthesis, intermediate 7 was reacted with methyl cyanoformate and catalytic amounts of hydrochloric acid to close the indoline system to form alcohol 8. Conversion of alcohol 8 to the Wieland-Gumlich aldehyde 9 featured a reduction of the alkene bond using zinc powder, followed by epimerization then reduction of the –CO_{2}Me ester group.

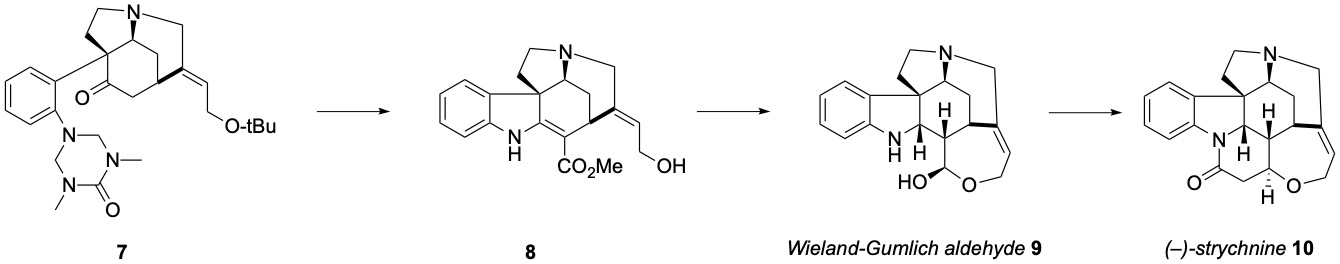

The final step of the synthesis was a transformation of the Wieland-Gumlich aldehyde 9 to the final (–)-strychnine 10 using a method previously reported.

== Kuehne synthesis (1993) ==
The Keuhne synthesis concerns the formation of racemic (±)-strychnine. Starting compounds tryptamine 1 and 4,4-dimethoxy acrolein 2 were reacted together with boron trifluoride to form acetal 3 as a single diastereomer in an amine-carbonyl condensation / sigmatropic rearrangement sequence.

Hydrolysis with perchloric acid afforded aldehyde 4. A Johnson–Corey–Chaykovsky reaction (reagents trimethylsulfonium iodide / n-butyllithium) converted 4 to an epoxide, which reacted in situ with the tertiary amine to ammonium salt 5 (contaminated with other cyclization byproducts). Reduction (H_{2} with Pd/C) removed the benzyl group to give alcohol 6. Reduction of 6 using sodium cyanoborohydride, and acylation (reagents acetic anhydride / pyridine) produced 7 as a mixture of C17 epimers. The ring closure of ring III to intermediate 8 was achieved with an aldol reaction using lithium bis(trimethylsilyl)amide, using only the epimer with correct configuration. Subsequent reduction of 8 using sodium borohydride, followed by acylation resulted in epimeric diacetate 9.

A DBU-mediated elimination reaction formed olefinic alcohol 10, and subsequent Swern oxidation give the unstable amino ketone 11. In the final steps, a Horner–Wadsworth–Emmons reaction with methyl 2-(diethyl-1-phosphono)acetate provide acrylate ester 12 as a mixture of cis and trans isomers which could be converted into the desired trans isomer via application of light in a photochemical rearrangement. The ester 12 was reduced (reagents DIBAL / boron trifluoride) to isostrychnine 13, and racemic strychnine 14 was formed by base-catalyzed ring closure, as it was in the Woodward synthesis.

In 1998, Kuehne and co-workers were able to synthesize chiral (–)-strychnine; in this synthesis the original starting material was derived from chiral tryptophan.

== Rawal synthesis (1994) ==
This stereocontrolled synthesis achieved by Rawal and co-workers begins with the conversion of nitrile 1 to aniline 2, which is then coupled to the unsaturated aldehyde component 2a to form diene 3. This intermediate then underwent an intramolecular Diels–Alder reaction to form hexane 4. Hydrolysis of all the present ester groups and quenching with methanol formed lactam 5. The available amine in 5 was alkylated using a TBS-protected vinyl iodide component to give intermediate 6. Heck reaction of the vinyl iodide moiety, followed by removal of the TBS-protecting group yielded isostrychnine 7. In the last step of the pathway, 7 is converted to the desired strychnine product 8 by base-mediated isomerization.

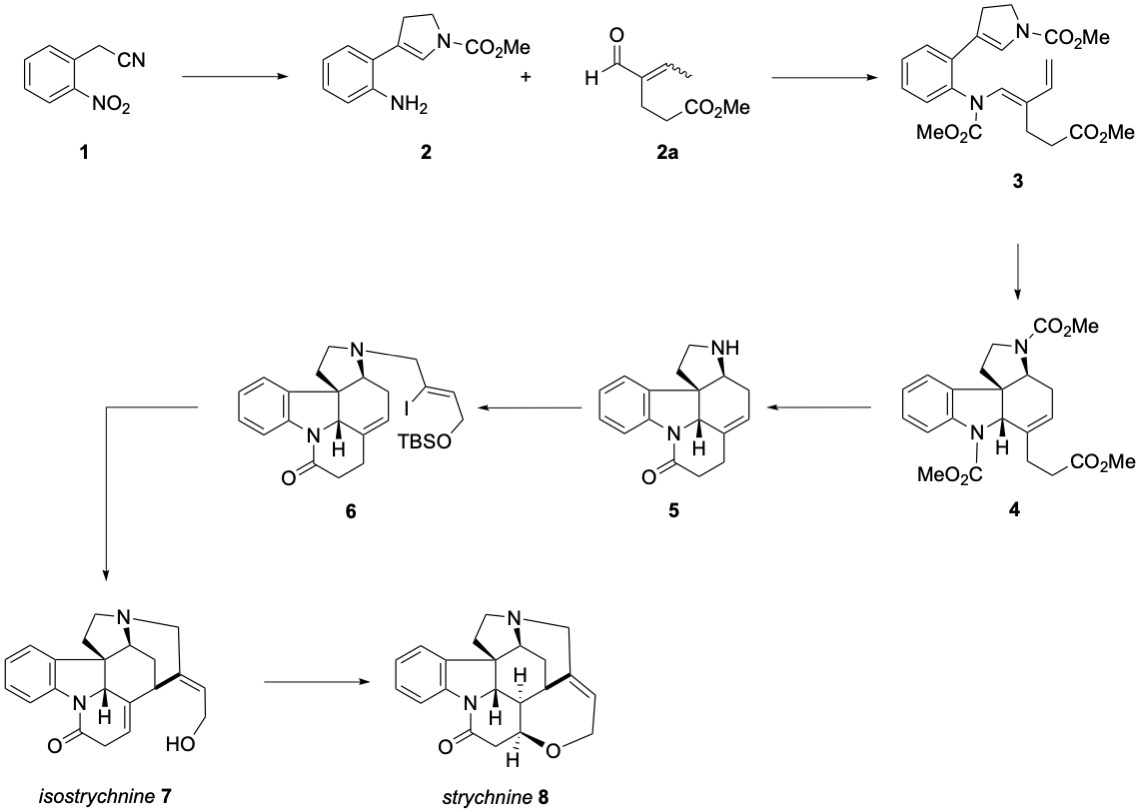

Notably, the conversion of isostrychnine to the racemic strychnine resulted in a 10% yield over the course of 13 reaction steps. As of 2012, this remains the highest of any published syntheses.

== Bosch synthesis (1999) ==
The work of Bosch and co-workers was a chiral endeavor, and began with cyclohexenone 1, which was converted to nitro compound 2 over three steps. Compound 2 was then converted to an aldehyde by ozonolysis and chiral amine 3 was formed in a double reductive amination with (S)-1-phenethylamine. The phenylethyl substituent was removed using 1-chloroethyl chloroformate, and the enone group was introduced in a Grieco elimination, forming carbamate 4. The amino group in 4 was deprotected by refluxing in methanol and then alkylated with alkyl component 4a to tertiary amine 5. A reductive Heck reaction followed by methoxycarbonylation (reagents LiHMDS, NCCO_{2}Me) gave tricycle 6. Reaction of the tricycle with zinc dust in 10% sulfuric acid removed the TBDMS protecting group, reduced the nitro group, and induced a reductive amino-carbonyl cyclization in a single step to pentacyclic compound 7, obtained as a mixture of epimers. In the final step to Wieland-Gumlich aldehyde 8, reaction with sodium hydride in MeOH afforded the correct epimer of 7 and, followed by DIBAH reduction of the methyl ester. The aldehyde 8 was then converted to the target (–)-strychnine 9 by using a previously reported method.

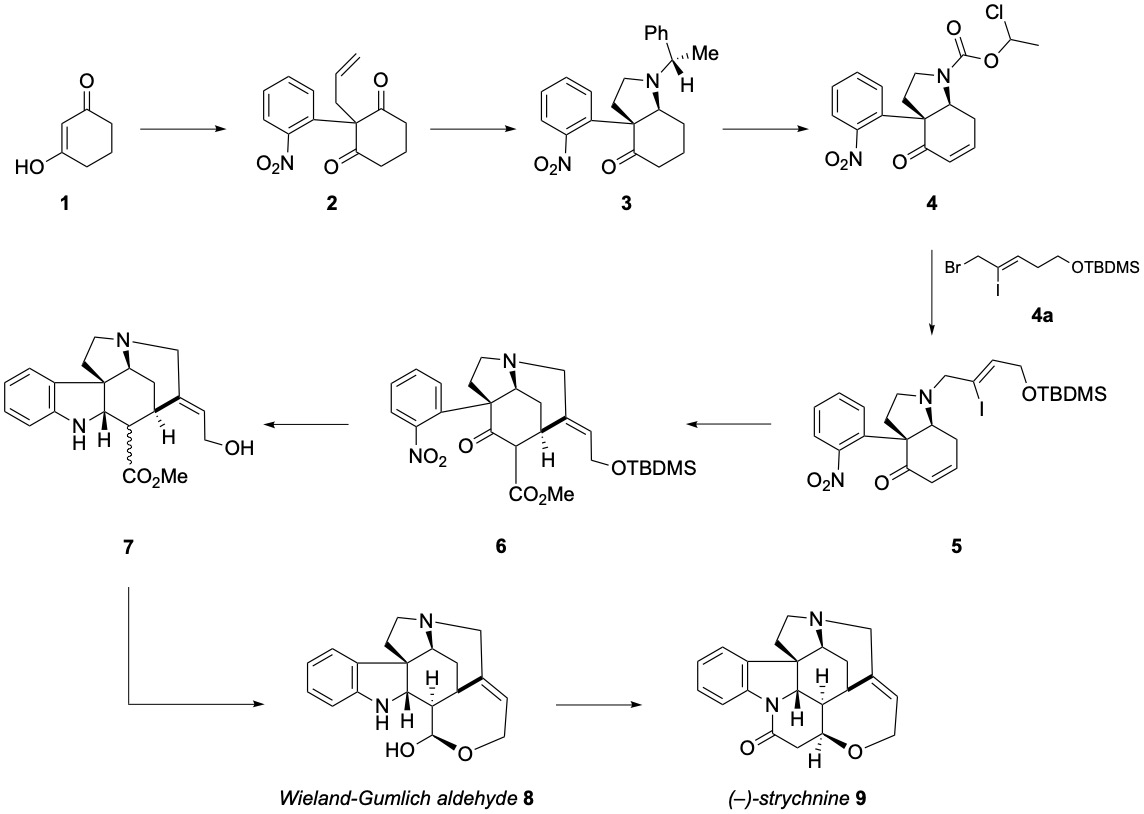

== Vollhardt synthesis (2000) ==
The formal synthesis reported in 2000 by Vollhardt and co-workers features a key [2+2+2] cycloaddition step to form the indoline core of the molecule. The sequence begins with tryptamine 1 which has its primary amine protected using acetic anhydride, and the indole nitrogen is acylated with component 1a to form alkyne 2. In the crucial cycloaddition step, the alkyne is then reacted with acetylene and organocobalt compound cyclopentadienyl cobalt (CpCo(C_{2}H_{4})_{2}) to give tetracycle 3 as a single diastereomer.

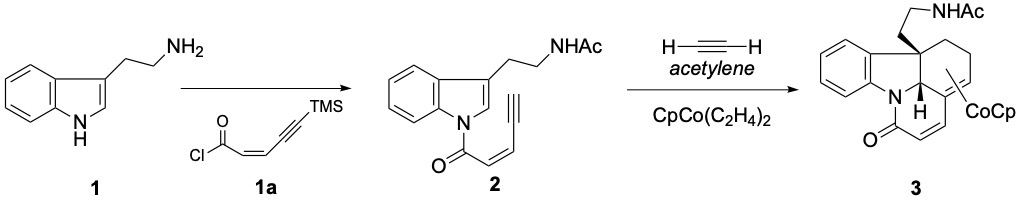

The pyrrolidine ring is closed in a [1,8]-conjugate addition of the amine group, first upon deprotection of the N-acetyl amine, followed by demetalation of the cobalt intermediate using an iron(III)-compound to give pentacycle 4. The pyrrolidine amine is then alkylated with component 4a, and the diene group in rings III and IV are isomerized to be in conjugation with the amide carbonyl, to give the intermediate 5.

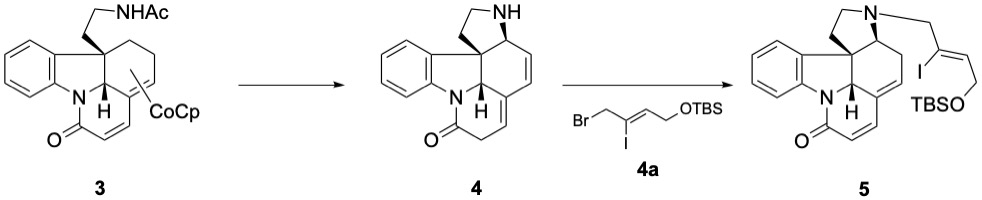

Radical-mediated addition of the vinyl iodide moiety to close ring VII gave compound 6 as a 1:1 mixture of E and Z alkene isomers (only Z-alkene shown for clarity). The TBS-protecting group was then removed in the next step to give isostrychnine 7, which was then readily converted to the racemic strychnine product 8.

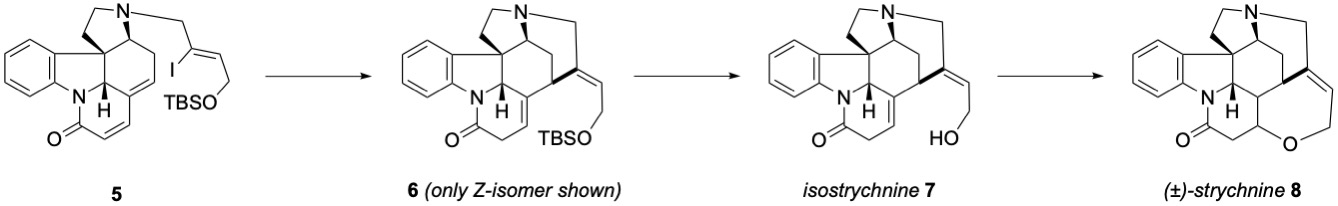

== Mori synthesis (2002) ==
The synthesis reported by Mori and co-workers in 2002 was the first one to contain an asymmetric reaction step. It also features a large number of Pd-catalyzed reactions. In this synthesis, cyclohexene 1 was reacted with the bromoaniline derivative 2 in an allylic asymmetric substitution using Pd_{2}(dba)_{3} and asymmetric ligand (S-BINAPO) to form chiral secondary amine 3. Desilylation of the TBDMS group using hydrochloric acid was performed, following by conversion of the resulting alcohol to a suitable bromide using PBr_{3} and substitution of the bromide using sodium cyanide to form nitrile 4. Heck reaction of 4 using Pd(OAc)_{2} / Me_{2}PPh followed by debromination using silver carbonate afforded tricycle 5. Reduction of the nitrile group in 5 using lithium aluminum hydride was followed by protection of the free amine using Boc anhydride to give Boc-protected 6. This intermediate was then subjected to allylic oxidation conditions (reagents Pd(OAc)_{2}, acetic acid, benzoquinone, and manganese dioxide) to form tetracycle 7. Hydroboration-oxidation of tetracycle 7 using 9-BBN / H_{2}O_{2} and subsequent Swern oxidation gave ketone 8.

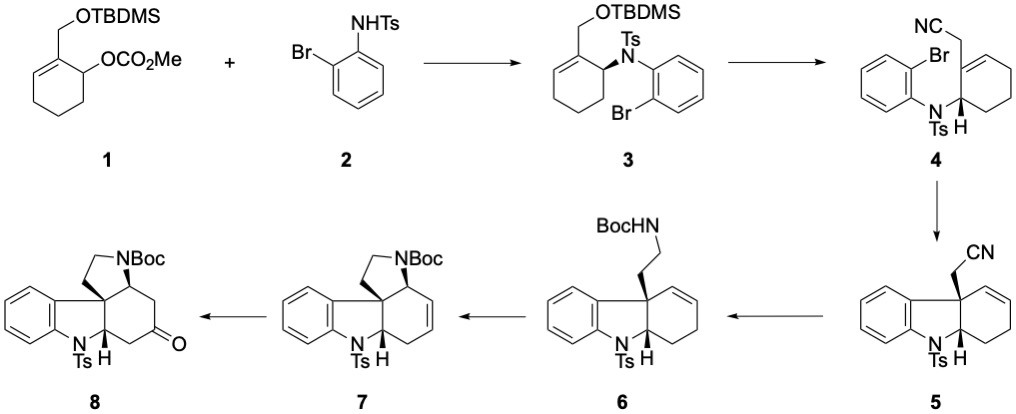

Reduction of ketone 8 to alkene 9 was performed using a previously reported procedure. Alkene 9 was detosylated and acylated at the amine group using (Z)-3-bromoacryloyl chloride to give compound 10. Compound 10 was reacted with Pd(OAc)_{2} and PPh_{3} in the presence of i-Pr_{2}NEt to form pentacycle 11. Removal of the Boc-protecting group, followed by immediate alkylation with fragment 11a furnished compound 12. Ring VII was closed in the next step, giving compound 13, which was readily reducing using lithium aluminum hydride to isostrychnine 14. In the last step of the sequence, potassium hydroxide was used to convert 14 to (–)-strychnine 15.

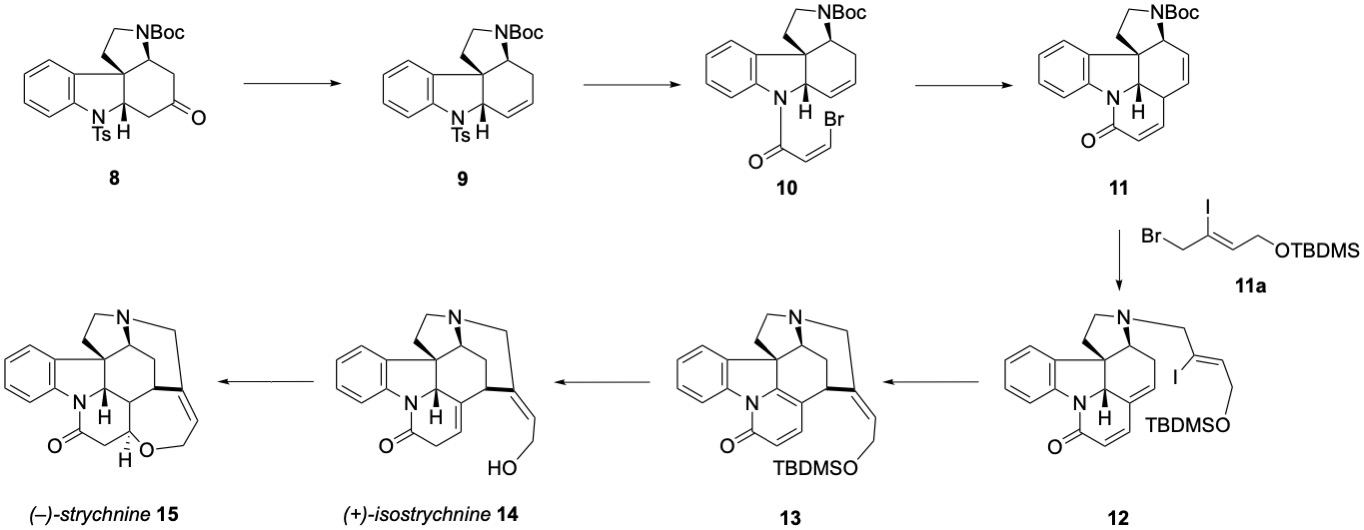

== Shibasaki synthesis (2002) ==
The synthesis reported by Shibasaki and co-workers in 2002 was a second published synthesis that also featured a key asymmetric reaction step. The synthesis begins with cyclohexenone 1, reacted with dimethyl malonate 2 in an asymmetric Michael reaction using BINOL, to form chiral diester 3. The ketone group in 3 was protected as the acetal (reagents 2-ethyl-2-methyl-1,3-dioxolane, TsOH) and a carboxyl group was removed (reagents LiCl, DMSO, 140 °C) to yield monoester 4. Weinreb amide 5 was added to the monoester to form PMB-protected ether 6. The ketone group in 6 was reduced to the alcohol (reagents NaBH_{3}CN, TiCl_{4}) and eliminated as water (reagents DCC, CuCl) to form alkene 7. Ester reduction using DIBAL, followed by TIPS protection of the alcohol intermediate allowed for removal of the acetal using catalytic CSA to give ketone 8. Enone 9 was then formed by Saegusa oxidation. The addition of the alcohol group in 10 was accomplished via a Mukaiyama aldol addition using formaldehyde. Iodonation of 10 using I_{2} and DMAP gave compound 11. This compound was then subjected to Stille coupling conditions (reagents Pd_{2}dba_{3}, Ph_{3}As, CuI) in order to incorporate nitrobenzene unit 12. SEM protection of 11 (reagents SEMCl, i-Pr2NEt) and removal of the TIPS-protecting group using hydrofluoric acid produced alcohol 13.

In the second part of the sequence, alcohol 13 was converted to a triflate using triflic anhydride and N,N-diisopropylethylamine. The 2,2-bis(ethylthio)ethylamine component 14 was added, followed immediately by zinc powder, setting up a tandem reaction featuring nitro group reduction to the amine, 1,4-addition of the thio-amine group and amine-keto condensation to indole 16. Reaction with DMTSF allowed for thionium attack at C7, forming 17. The imine group in 17 was then reduced (reagents NaBH_{3}CN and TiCl_{4}) and the resulting amino group was acylated with acetic anhydride. Both alcohol protecting groups were removed (reagents NaOMe / MeOH), with the allyl alcohol group re-protected with a TIPS-protecting group. This allowed for removal of the ethylthio group (reagents NiCl_{2}, NaBH_{4}, EtOH/MeOH) to form alcohol 18. The alcohol group in 18 was oxidized to the aldehyde using a Parikh-Doering oxidation, and TIPS-protecting group removal and reaction with the free aldehyde led to the formation of hemiacetal 19.

== Li synthesis (2002) ==
In 2002, Bodwell and Li reported a concise synthesis of racemic strychnine, completed in 12 steps. This synthesis is considered a formal synthesis, as the target molecule produced was a compound previously prepared by Rawal and co-workers in their 1994 work. The highlight of the formal synthesis was an inverse-electron-demand Diels–Alder reaction of cyclophane 1 by heating in N,N-diethylaniline, with N_{2} gas being released as a byproduct to form compound 2. Chemoselective reduction of the double bond in 2 by reaction with sodium borohydride and triflic acid formed intermediate 3. The carbamate moiety in 3 was converted to the free amine by reaction with PDC and celite to form compound 4.

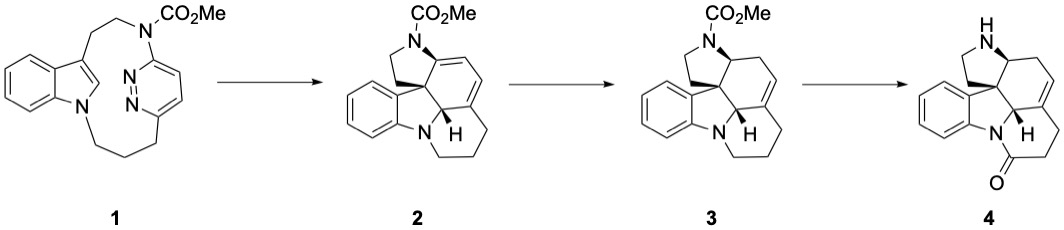

In their report, Bodwell and Li noted that the intermediate 4 could be converted to isostrychnine using Rawal's method, and then into the final strychnine product using Kuehne's method.

== Fukuyama synthesis (2004) ==
The chiral synthesis of (–)-strychnine by Fukuyama and co-workers in 2004 began from the coupling of indolylmalonate 1 and vinyl epoxide 2. Chirality of this synthesis was fixed by enzymatic resolution of the vinyl epoxide. Palladium-catalyzed coupling of 1 and 2 gave compound 3, which was modified in a few ways; the TBS-protecting groups were removed, while the free alcohol was protected with a MOM-protecting group and the indole amine moiety was protected using Boc anhydride, resulting in diol 4. This diol was subjected to the Mitsunobu reaction using NsNH_{2} to give intermediate 5.

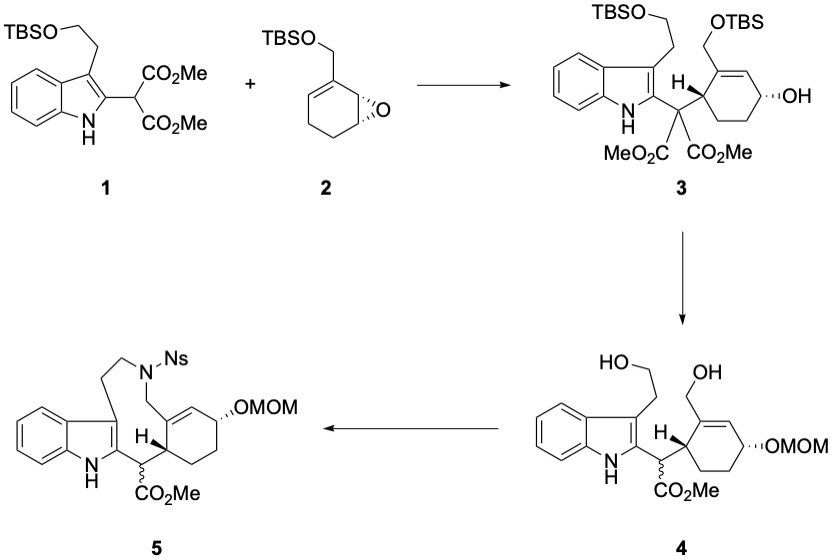

The MOM-protecting group was removed and the resulting alcohol was oxidized to the ketone using Dess-Martin periodinane to form compound 6. Rubottom oxidation of 6 gave acyloin 7. From here, acyloin 7 was subject to oxidative cleavage using lead(IV) acetate to form aldehyde 8. A one-pot removal of the nosyl group in 8 using PhSH and Cs_{2}CO_{3} also allowed for transannular cyclization to form pentacycle 9. Reduction with DIBAL gives the Wieland-Gumlich aldehyde 10.

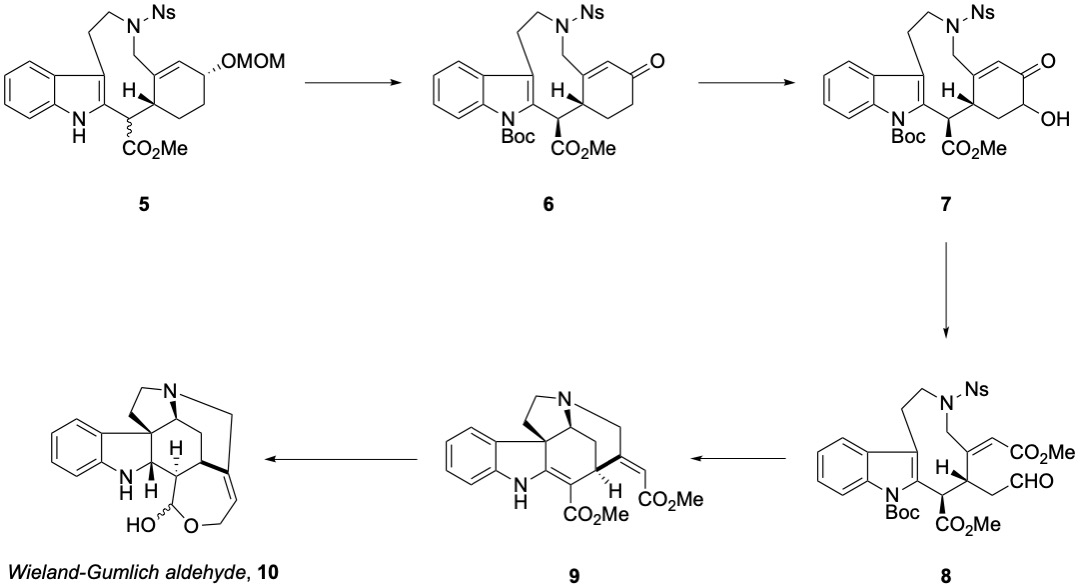

The Wieland-Gumlich aldehyde 10 was then converted to the final product, (–)-strychnine 11 over 4 steps, which had been previously reported in the literature.

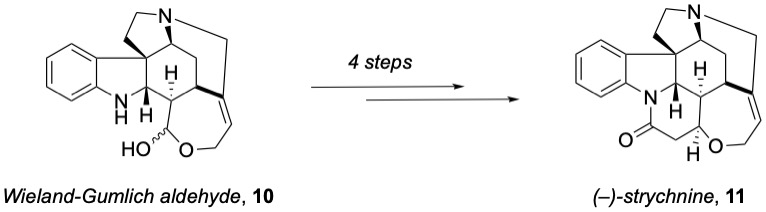

== Reissig synthesis (2010) ==
This short formal synthesis, reported by Beemelmanns and Reissig in 2010, provides a synthetic pathway that leads to the Rawal pentacycle target (see amine 5 in the Rawal synthesis). In this synthesis, indole 1 is reacted using a SmI_{2}-mediated cascade reaction to give nitrile 2 along with two other minor byproducts (not pictured). Reaction of 2 with Raney nickel over a period of 3 days leads directly to the formation of pentacycle 3 as a single diastereomer. Acylation of the free amine and reaction of the pentacycle with mesyl chloride and DBU leads to carbamate 4, with elimination of the tertiary alcohol leaving the alkene in the correct position. Further, this compound which was noted as having the correct stereochemistry of the highlighted hydrogen atoms, contradicting the earlier work of Bodwell and Li.

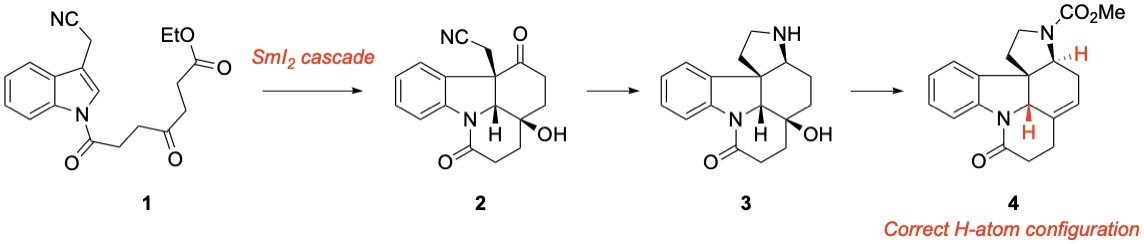

Carbamate 4 was then deprotected back to the free amine using trimethylsilyl iodide, allowing for installation of the tosylated component 5, achieving the construction of the Rawal pentacycle 6. From here, TBS-protected isostrychnine 7 could be synthesized via a previously known Heck reaction.

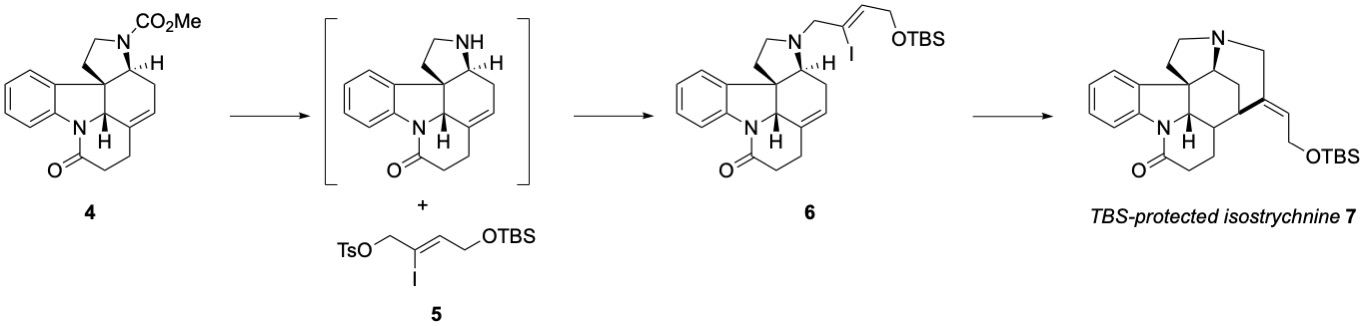

== Vanderwal synthesis (2011) ==
In 2011, Vanderwal and Martin reported a very consise synthesis of strychnine, consisting of six linear steps in the overall total synthesis. The synthetic pathway begins with the conversion of tryptamine derivative 1 to Zincke aldehyde 2 upon reaction with pyridine and suitable pyridinium salt. The Zincke aldehyde is then converted to tetracycle 3 via a previously reported base-mediated Diels–Alder reaction. In the next step, the N-allyl group was removed to generate the free amine 4 in situ, which was then immediately reacted with trimethylsilyl component 5 to generate tetracycle 6.

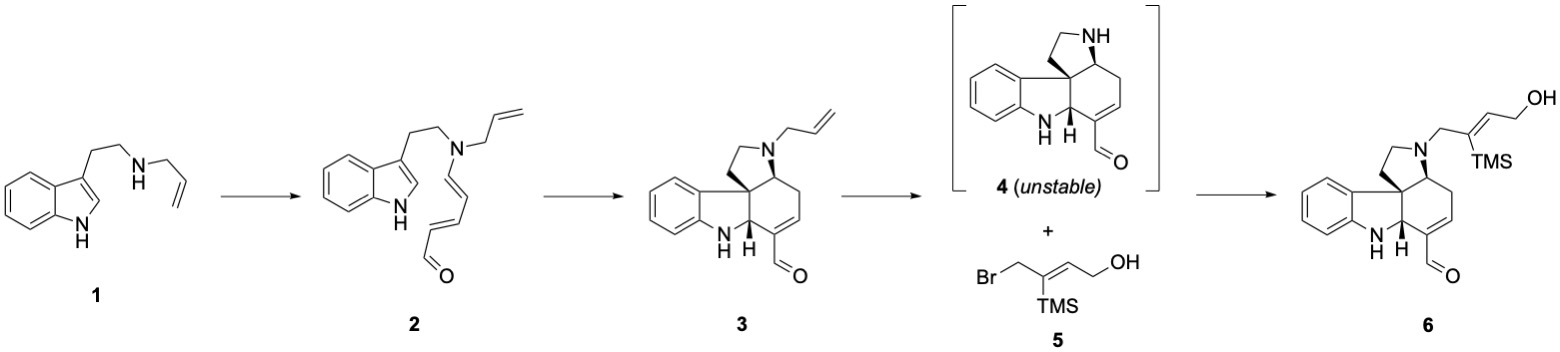

Compound 6 is then converted to the Wieland-Gumlich aldehyde 7 via a tandem Brook rearrangement/intramolecular conjugate addition reaction. The last step in the sequence is conversion of the Wieland-Gumlich aldehyde to the strychnine product 8, using a previously reported method.

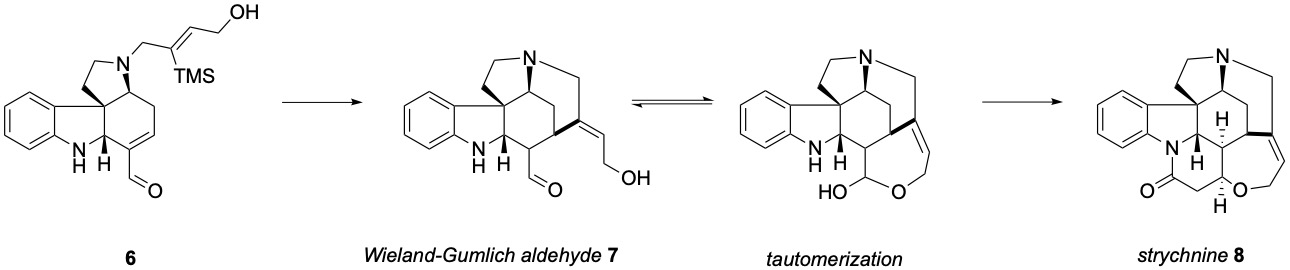
