= Beta-adrenergic-receptor kinase =

Enzyme

beta-adrenergic receptor kinase

Identifiers
- EC no.: 2.7.11.15
- CAS no.: 102925-39-3

Databases
- IntEnz: IntEnz view
- BRENDA: BRENDA entry
- ExPASy: NiceZyme view
- KEGG: KEGG entry
- MetaCyc: metabolic pathway
- PRIAM: profile
- PDB structures: RCSB PDB PDBe PDBsum
- Gene Ontology: AmiGO / QuickGO
Search
- PMC: articles
- PubMed: articles
- NCBI: proteins

In enzymology, a beta-adrenergic-receptor kinase (EC 2.7.11.15) is an enzyme that catalyzes the chemical reaction:

ATP + [beta-adrenergic receptor] $\rightleftharpoons$ ADP + phospho-[beta-adrenergic receptor]

Thus, the two substrates of this enzyme are ATP and beta-adrenergic receptor, whereas its two products are ADP and phospho-beta-adrenergic receptor.

This enzyme belongs to the family of transferases, specifically those transferring a phosphate group to the sidechain oxygen atom of serine or threonine residues in proteins (protein-serine/threonine kinases). The systematic name of this enzyme class is ATP:[beta-adrenergic receptor] phosphotransferase. Other names in common use include ATP:beta-adrenergic-receptor phosphotransferase, [beta-adrenergic-receptor] kinase, beta-adrenergic receptor-specific kinase, beta-AR kinase, beta-ARK, beta-ARK 1, beta-ARK 2, beta-receptor kinase, GRK2, GRK3, beta-adrenergic-receptor kinase (phosphorylating), beta2ARK, betaARK1, beta-adrenoceptor kinase, beta-adrenoceptor kinase 1, beta-adrenoceptor kinase 2, ADRBK1, BARK1, adrenergic receptor kinase, and STK15. Several compounds are known to inhibit this enzyme, including Zinc, and Digitonin.
