= Cholesterol total synthesis =

Cholesterol

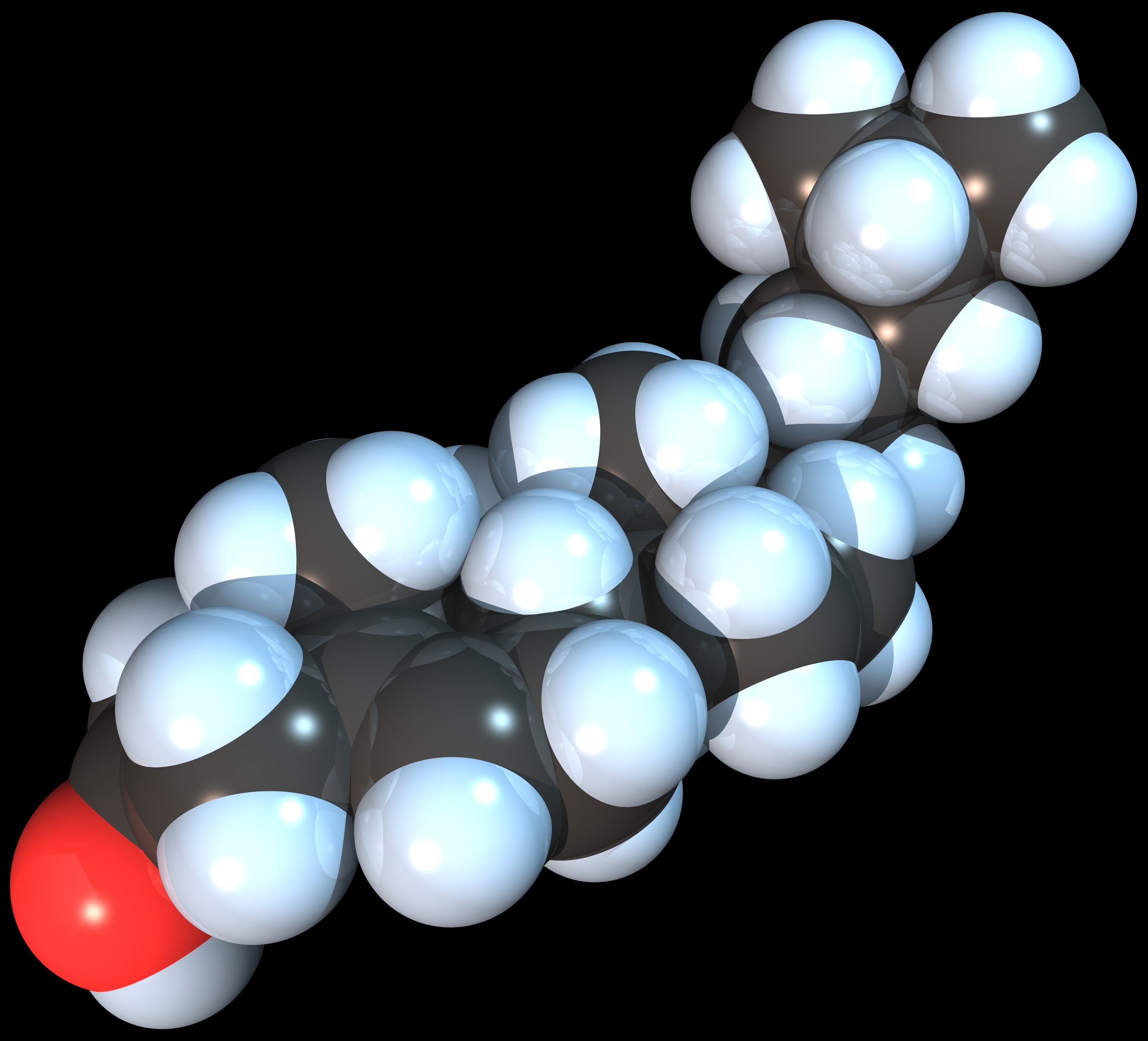
Cholesterol space-filling model

Cholesterol total synthesis in chemistry describes the total synthesis of the complex biomolecule cholesterol and is considered a great scientific achievement. The research group of Robert Robinson with John Cornforth (Oxford University) published their synthesis in 1951 and that of Robert Burns Woodward with Franz Sondheimer (Harvard University) in 1952. Both groups competed for the first publication since 1950 with Robinson having started in 1932 and Woodward in 1949. According to historian Greg Mulheirn the Robinson effort was hampered by his micromanagement style of leadership and the Woodward effort was greatly facilitated by his good relationships with chemical industry. Around 1949 steroids like cortisone were produced from natural resources but expensive. Chemical companies Merck & Co. and Monsanto saw commercial opportunities for steroid synthesis and not only funded Woodward but also provided him with large quantities of certain chemical intermediates from pilot plants. Hard work also helped the Woodward effort: one of the intermediate compounds was named Christmasterone as it was synthesized on Christmas Day 1950 by Sondheimer.

Other cholesterol schemes have also been developed: racemic cholesterol was synthesized in 1966 by W.S. Johnson, the enantiomer of natural cholesterol was reported in 1996 by Rychnovsky and Mickus, in 2002 by Jiang & Covey and again in 2008 by Rychnovsky and Belani.

== The molecule ==
Cholesterol is a tetracyclic alcohol and a type of sterol. Added to the sterol frame with the alcohol group at position 3 are 2 methyl groups at carbon positions 10 and 13 and a 2-isooctyl group at position 17. The molecule is unsaturated at position 5,6 with an alkene group. The total number of stereocenters is 8. The unnatural cholesterol molecule that has also been synthesized is called ent-cholesterol.

== Robinson synthesis ==
The Robinson synthesis is an example of a so-called relay synthesis. As many of the chemical intermediates (all steroids) were already known and available from natural resources all that was needed for a formal synthesis was proof that these intermediates could be linked to each other via chemical synthesis. Starting point for the Robinson synthesis was 1,6-dihydroxynaphthalene 1 that was converted in about 20 steps into the then already known androsterone 4. Ruzicka had already demonstrated in 1938 that androsterone could be converted into androstenedione 5 and Robinson demonstrated its conversion to dehydroepiandrosterone 6 (note the epimerized hydroxyl group) also already a known compound. Conversion of 6 to pregnenolone 7 and then to allopregnanolone 8 allowed the addition of the tail group as the acetate in 9 and then conversion to cholestanol 10.

Cholesterol Robinson synthesis

The conversion of cholestanol to cholesterol was already demonstrated by oxidation of the ketone, bromination to the bromoketone and elimination to the enone.

Cholestenone - cholesterol synthesis Ruzicka

The conversion of cholestenone into cholesterol by the method of Dauben and Eastham (1950) consisted of reduction of the enol acetate (lithium aluminium hydride) and fractionation with digitonin for the isolation of the correct isomer.

== Woodward synthesis ==
Starting point for the Woodward synthesis was the substituted benzoquinone 1 that was converted to cis-bicycle 2 in a Diels-Alder reaction with butadiene. Conversion to the desired trans isomer 5 was accomplished by synthesis of the sodium enolate salt 4 (benzene, sodium hydride) followed by acidification. Reduction (lithium aluminium hydride) then gave diol 6, a dehydration (HCl/water) gave ketol 7, deoxygenation of its acetate by elemental zinc gave enone 8, formylation (ethyl formate) gave enol 9, Michael ethyl vinyl ketone addition (potassium t-butoxide/t-butanol) gave dione 11 which on reaction with KOH in dioxane gave tricycle 12 in an aldol condensation with elimination of the formyl group. In the next series of steps oxidation (osmium tetroxide) gave diol 13, protection (acetone/copper sulfate) gave acetonide 14, hydrogenation (palladium-strontium carbonate) gave 15, formylation (ethyl formate) gave enol 16 which protected as the enamine 17 (N-methylaniline/methanol) gave via the potassium anion 18, carboxylic acid 19 by reaction with cyanoethylene using triton B as the base.

Cholesterol synthesis Woodward 1

Acid 19 was converted to lactone 20 using acetic anhydride and sodium acetate. Subsequent Fujimoto-Belleau reaction with methylmagnesium chloride gave tetracyclic ketone 21. Treatment with periodic acid (dioxane) and piperidine acetate (benzene) gave aldehyde 24 through diol 22 (oxidation) and dialdehyde 23 (aldol condensation). Sodium dichromate oxidation gave carboxylic acid 25, Diazomethane treatment gave methyl ester 26 and sodium borohydride the allyl alcohol 27. Chiral resolution of this racemic compound with digitonin produced chiral 28 and on Oppenauer oxidation chiral 29. Hydrogenation (Adams' catalyst) gave alcohol 30, chromic acid oxidation gave ketone 31, sodium borohydride reduction stereoselectively gave alcohol 32, hydrolysis followed by acylation gave acetate 33, thionyl chloride treatment gave acyl chloride 34 and methyl cadmium the ketone 35.

Cholesterol synthesis Woodward 2

In the final stages reaction of 35 with isohexylmagnesium bromide 36 gave diol 37, acetic acid treatment gave dehydration and then hydrogenation gave acetate 38. Hydrolysis of this ester gave cholestanol 39. The route from cholestanol to cholesterol was already known (see: Robinson synthesis).

Cholesterol synthesis Woodward 3
