= Androprostamine =

Androprostamines

- Chemical structures of androprostamine A (top) and androprostamine B

Identifiers
CAS Number	A: 1570045-05-4; B: 1570045-06-5
3D model (JSmol)	A: Interactive image; B: Interactive image
- InChI: A: InChI=1S/C26H38ClN5O10/c1-26(2,42)22(23(37)31-16(25(40)41)9-13-10-17(33)21(27)18(34)11-13)32-20(36)12-14(28)5-3-4-8-30-19(35)7-6-15(29)24(38)39/h9-11,14-15,22,33-34,42H,3-8,12,28-29H2,1-2H3,(H,30,35)(H,31,37)(H,32,36)(H,38,39)(H,40,41)/b16-9-/t14-,15-,22+/m0/s1 Key: UEIVDLBQUOWRJU-PCCGUAOVSA-N; B: InChI=1S/C31H45ClN6O11/c1-31(2,49)26(28(44)37-20(30(47)48)12-16-13-21(39)25(32)22(40)14-16)38-24(42)15-17(33)6-3-4-10-35-23(41)9-8-19(29(45)46)36-27(43)18-7-5-11-34-18/h12-14,17-19,26,34,39-40,49H,3-11,15,33H2,1-2H3,(H,35,41)(H,36,43)(H,37,44)(H,38,42)(H,45,46)(H,47,48) Key: BYUWOLFRQQSZLA-UHFFFAOYSA-N
- SMILES: A: C(=C(\NC([C@@H](NC(C[C@H](CCCCNC(CC[C@@H](C(O)=O)N)=O)N)=O)[C@@](C)(C)O)=O)/C(O)=O)\C1=CC(O)=C(Cl)C(O)=C1; B: C(=C(NC(C(NC(CC(CCCCNC(CCC(NC(=O)C1CCCN1)C(O)=O)=O)N)=O)C(C)(C)O)=O)C(O)=O)C2=CC(O)=C(Cl)C(O)=C2

Properties
Chemical formula	A: C_{26}H_{38}ClN_{5}O_{10} B: C_{31}H_{45}ClN_{6}O_{11}
Molar mass	A: 616.06 g/mol B: 713.18 g/mol
- Except where otherwise noted, data are given for materials in their standard state (at 25 °C [77 °F], 100 kPa). Infobox references

Androprostamines are a pair of chemical compounds isolated from Streptomyces. They are designated androprostamine A and androprostamine B.

== History ==
Androprostamine A (APA) is a natural product of Streptomyces sp MK932-CF8 strain. The APA-producing strain was isolated from a soil sample collected in Yokohama, Japan. Andropostamine A was isolated from the fermented broth along with androprostamine B and the related chemical compound resormycin. Androprostamines are known as peptide compounds that share similarities to resormycin but with three distinct non-proteinogenic amino acids. These non-proteinogenic amino acids are dehydroamino acid at the C- terminus,6-homolysine and hydroxyvaline.

== Preclinical study ==
Andropostamine A is an inhibitor of the androgen receptor (AR) and was discovered through extensive screening of cultured broths from different microorganisms. Androprostamine A showed potent inhibition against androgen-dependent proliferation of human prostate cancer LNCap and VCaP cells.

Androprostamine A has been further studied in cancer since it was first isolated and has continued to be studied in prostate cancer. It has been tested on different cancer cell lines such as breast, ovarian, and even AR-negative prostate cancers. Still, it has demonstrated inhibition toward AR-positive prostate cancer, showing that it is highly selective for AR-positive prostate cancer.

== Mechanism of action ==
Based on previous studies, APA is a potent inhibitor against androgen-dependent growth of LNCaP and VCaP cells, Its mechanism of inhibition is still unknown.

== Physicochemical properties ==
The chemical formulas of androprostamines A and B are C_{26}H_{38}ClN_{5}O_{10} and C_{31}H_{45}ClN_{6}O_{11}, respectively. Their molecular weights are 616.06 g/mol and 713.18 g/mol.

== Synthesis ==
A total synthesis of androprostamine A was reported by Hikaru Abe and co-workers.
