= Triisobutylaluminium =

- Monomeric form

Names
- IUPAC name Triisobutylaluminum
- Other names Aluminumtriisobutanide; TIBA

Identifiers
CAS Number	100-99-2
3D model (JSmol)	Interactive image
ChemSpider	10430353
ECHA InfoCard	100.002.643
EC Number	202-906-3
PubChem CID	16682931
UNII	09P2THV2X4
UN number	3394 3051
CompTox Dashboard (EPA)	DTXSID0026670
- InChI: InChI=1S/3C4H9.Al/c3*1-4(2)3;/h3*4H,1H2,2-3H3; Key: MCULRUJILOGHCJ-UHFFFAOYSA-N
- SMILES: CC(C)C[Al](CC(C)C)CC(C)C

Properties
Chemical formula	C_{12}H_{27}Al
Molar mass	198.330 g·mol^{−1}
Appearance	Colorless liquid
Density	0.786 g/mL at 25 °C
Melting point	4 to 6 °C (39 to 43 °F; 277 to 279 K)
Boiling point	86 °C (13 hPa)

Hazards
- GHS labelling
Pictograms	(GHS02: Flammable) (GHS05: Corrosive)
Signal word	Danger
Hazard statements	H250, H260, H314
Precautionary statements	P210, P222, P223, P231+P232, P260, P264, P280, P301+P330+P331, P302+P334, P303+P361+P353, P304+P340, P305+P351+P338, P310, P321, P335+P334, P363, P370+P378, P402+P404, P405, P422, P501

Structure
Point group	C_{3h}
- Except where otherwise noted, data are given for materials in their standard state (at 25 °C [77 °F], 100 kPa). verify (what is ?) Infobox references

Triisobutylaluminium (TiBA) is an organoaluminium compound with the formula Al(CH_{2}CH(CH_{3})_{2})_{3}. This colorless pyrophoric liquid is mainly used to make linear primary alcohols and α-olefins.

== Structure ==
Triisobutylaluminium exists in equilibrium with its dimer. The equilibrium constant, K_{D}, is 3.810 at 20 °C.

2 Al(CH_{2}CH(CH_{3})_{2})_{3} $\ce{<=>>}$ [Al(CH_{2}CH(CH_{3})_{2})_{3}]_{2}

In the dimer, the bridging carbon-aluminium bond is elongated and exhibits evidence of restricted rotation. For the sake of simplicity, TiBA is written as the monomer in this article.

== Synthesis ==
Trialkylaluminium compounds are available industrially through the reactions of aluminium powder, hydrogen gas, and the desired alkenes. The synthesis of TiBA requires two steps; the first step produces diisobutylaluminium hydride (written as a monomer):

4 CH_{2}=C(CH_{3})_{2} + 2 Al + 3 H_{2} → 2 HAl(CH_{2}CH(CH_{3})_{2})_{2}

In the second step isobutylene adds to the diisobutylaluminium to give TiBA:

CH_{2}=C(CH_{3})_{2} + HAl(CH_{2}CH(CH_{3})_{2})_{2} → Al(CH_{2}CH(CH_{3})_{2})_{3}

== Reactions ==
α-olefins are readily eliminated from β-branched trialkylaluminium compounds. Trialkylaluminium compounds are used in the industrial production of polymers. In the most common of these compounds, TIBA, a substantial level of Al – H bonds are present at equilibrium. The greater stability of unbranched trialkylaluminium compounds relative to branched trialkylaluminium compounds in TIBA forms the basis for a general synthesis of triethyl- and higher linear trialkylaluminium materials from triisobutylaluminium.

Al(CH_{2}CH(CH_{3})_{2})_{3} + 3 RCH=CH_{2} → Al(CH_{2}CH_{2}R)_{3} + 3 CH_{2}=C(CH_{3})_{2}

== Safety ==
Like most organoaluminium compounds, TiBA reacts violently with water and air.
