= Indolizidine =

Names
- IUPAC name Octahydroindolizine
- Other names δ-Coniceine; 1-Azabicyclo[4.3.0]nonane

Identifiers
CAS Number	13618-93-4
3D model (JSmol)	Interactive image
ChemSpider	24347
ECHA InfoCard	100.033.716
PubChem CID	26136
UNII	4FG58K748F
CompTox Dashboard (EPA)	DTXSID40929286
- InChI: InChI=1S/C8H15N/c1-2-6-9-7-3-5-8(9)4-1/h8H,1-7H2 Key: HAJKHJOABGFIGP-UHFFFAOYSA-N; InChI=1/C8H15N/c1-2-6-9-7-3-5-8(9)4-1/h8H,1-7H2 Key: HAJKHJOABGFIGP-UHFFFAOYAG
- SMILES: N12CCCC1CCCC2

Properties
Chemical formula	C_{8}H_{15}N
Molar mass	125.215 g·mol^{−1}
Density	0.8956 g/cm^{3} (20 °C)
Boiling point	159 to 160 °C (318 to 320 °F; 432 to 433 K)
- Except where otherwise noted, data are given for materials in their standard state (at 25 °C [77 °F], 100 kPa). Infobox references

Indolizidine is a heterocyclic chemical compound that forms the central core of the indolizidine alkaloids such as swainsonine and castanospermine.

== See also ==
- Indole
- Indolizine
- Tryptophan
- Tryptamine
