= Total synthesis =

Complete chemical synthesis of a complex molecule

Total synthesis, a specialized area within organic chemistry, focuses on constructing complex organic compounds, especially those found in nature, using laboratory methods. It often involves synthesizing natural products from basic, commercially available starting materials. Total synthesis targets can also be organometallic or inorganic. While total synthesis aims for complete construction from simple starting materials, modifying or partially synthesizing these compounds is known as semisynthesis.

Natural product synthesis serves as a critical tool across various scientific fields. In organic chemistry, it tests new synthetic methods, validating and advancing innovative approaches. In medicinal chemistry, natural product synthesis is essential for creating bioactive compounds, driving progress in drug discovery and therapeutic development. Similarly, in chemical biology, it provides research tools for studying biological systems and processes. Additionally, synthesis aids natural product research by helping confirm and elucidate the structures of newly isolated compounds.

The field of natural product synthesis has progressed remarkably since the early 19th century, with improvements in synthetic techniques, analytical methods, and an evolving understanding of chemical reactivity. Today, modern synthetic approaches often combine traditional organic methods, biocatalysis, and chemoenzymatic strategies to achieve efficient and complex syntheses, broadening the scope and applicability of synthetic processes.

Key components of natural product synthesis include retrosynthetic analysis, which involves planning synthetic routes by working backward from the target molecule to design the most effective construction pathway. Stereochemical control is crucial to ensure the correct three-dimensional arrangement of atoms, critical for the molecule's functionality. Reaction optimization enhances yield, selectivity, and efficiency, making synthetic steps more practical. Finally, scale-up considerations allow researchers to adapt lab-scale syntheses for larger production, expanding the accessibility of synthesized products. This evolving field continues to fuel advancements in drug development, materials science, and our understanding of the diversity in natural compounds.

== Scope and definitions ==
There are numerous classes of natural products for which total synthesis is applied to. These include (but are not limited to): terpenes, alkaloids, polyketides. and polyethers. Total synthesis targets are sometimes referred to by their organismal origin such as plant, marine, and fungal. The term total synthesis is less frequently but still accurately applied to the synthesis of natural polypeptides and polynucleotides. The peptide hormones oxytocin and vasopressin were isolated and their total syntheses first reported in 1954. It is not uncommon for natural product targets to feature multiple structural components of several natural product classes.

== Aims ==
Although untrue from an historical perspective (see the history of the steroid, cortisone), total synthesis in the modern age has largely been an academic endeavor (in terms of manpower applied to problems). Industrial chemical needs often differ from academic focuses. Typically, commercial entities may pick up particular avenues of total synthesis efforts and expend considerable resources on particular natural product targets, especially if semi-synthesis can be applied to complex, natural product-derived drugs. Even so, for decades there has been a continuing discussion regarding the value of total synthesis as an academic enterprise. While there are some outliers, the general opinions are that total synthesis has changed in recent decades, will continue to change, and will remain an integral part of chemical research. Within these changes, there has been increasing focus on improving the practicality and marketability of total synthesis methods. The Phil S. Baran group at Scripps, a notable pioneer of practical synthesis have endeavored to create scalable and high efficiency syntheses that would have more immediate uses outside of academia.

== History ==
Vitamin B_{12} total synthesis: Retrosynthetic analysis of the Woodward–Eschenmoser total synthesis that was reported in two variants by these groups in 1972. The work involved more than 100 PhD trainees and postdoctoral fellows from 19 different countries. The retrosynthesis presents the disassembly of the target vitamin in a manner that makes chemical sense for its eventual forward construction. The target, Vitamin B_{12} (I), is envisioned being prepared by the simple addition of its tail, which had earlier been shown to be feasible. The needed precursor, cobyric acid (II), then becomes the target and constitutes the "corrin core" of the vitamin, and its preparation was envisaged to be possible via two pieces, a "western" part composed of the A and D rings (III) and an "eastern" part composed of the B and C rings (IV). The restrosynthetic analysis then envisions the starting materials required to make these two complex parts, the yet complex molecules V–VIII.

Friedrich Wöhler discovered that an organic substance, urea, could be produced from inorganic starting materials in 1828. That was an important conceptual milestone in chemistry by being the first example of a synthesis of a substance that had been known only as a byproduct of living processes. Wöhler obtained urea by treating silver cyanate with ammonium chloride, a simple, one-step synthesis:

AgNCO + NH_{4}Cl → (NH_{2})_{2}CO + AgCl

Camphor was a scarce and expensive natural product with a worldwide demand. Haller and Blanc synthesized it from camphor acid; however, the precursor, camphoric acid, had an unknown structure. When Finnish chemist Gustav Komppa synthesized camphoric acid from diethyl oxalate and 3,3-dimethylpentanoic acid in 1904, the structure of the precursors allowed contemporary chemists to infer the complicated ring structure of camphor. Shortly thereafter, William Perkin published another synthesis of camphor. The work on the total chemical synthesis of camphor allowed Komppa to begin industrial production of the compound, in Tainionkoski, Finland, in 1907.

The American chemist Robert Burns Woodward was a pre-eminent figure in developing total syntheses of complex organic molecules, some of his targets being cholesterol, cortisone, strychnine, lysergic acid, reserpine, chlorophyll, colchicine, vitamin B_{12}, and prostaglandin F-2a.

Vincent du Vigneaud was awarded the 1955 Nobel Prize in Chemistry for the total synthesis of the natural polypeptide oxytocin and vasopressin, which reported in 1954 with the citation "for his work on biochemically important sulphur compounds, especially for the first synthesis of a polypeptide hormone."

Another gifted chemist is Elias James Corey, who won the Nobel Prize in Chemistry in 1990 for lifetime achievement in total synthesis and for the development of retrosynthetic analysis.

== List of notable total syntheses ==
- Quinine total synthesis First synthesized by Robert Burns Woodward and William von Eggers Doering in 1944, this achievement was significant due to quinine's importance as an antimalarial drug.
- Strychnine total synthesis First synthesized by Robert Burns Woodward in 1954, this synthesis was a landmark achievement due to the molecule's structural complexity.
- Morphine: First synthesized by Marshall D. Gates in 1952, with subsequent more efficient syntheses developed by other chemists, including Toshiaki Fukuyama in 2017.
- Cholesterol total synthesis Synthesized by Robert Burns Woodward in 1951, this was a significant achievement in steroid synthesis.
- Cortisone: Another notable steroid synthesis by Robert Burns Woodward in 1951.
- Lysergic acid: Synthesized by Robert Burns Woodward in 1954, this was an important precursor to LSD.
- Reserpine: Completed by Robert Burns Woodward in 1956, this synthesis was notable for its complexity and the molecule's importance as an antihypertensive drug.
- Chlorophyll: Synthesized by Robert Burns Woodward in 1960, this achievement was significant due to chlorophyll's crucial role in photosynthesis.
- Colchicine: Another notable synthesis by Robert Burns Woodward, completed in 1963.
- Prostaglandin F_{2α}: Synthesized by E.J. Corey in 1969, this was an important achievement in the synthesis of prostaglandins.
- Vitamin B_{12} total synthesis Completed by Robert Burns Woodward and his team in 1972, this synthesis is considered one of the most complex ever achieved, involving over 100 steps.
- Paclitaxel (Taxol) total synthesis: First synthesized by Robert A. Holton in 1994, and later by K. C. Nicolaou in 1995, this anticancer drug's synthesis was a major breakthrough in medicinal chemistry.
- Brefeldin A: Synthesized by S. Raghavan in 2017, this complex macrolide has potential as an anticancer agent.
- Ryanodine: Synthesized by Sarah E. Reisman in 2017, this complex diterpenoid has important biological activity.
