= Carbonyl condensation =

Organic reaction of carbonyl compounds with amines to imines

Reaction of cyclohexylamine with acetaldehyde forming an imine. Sodium sulfate removes water

In organic chemistry, alkylimino-de-oxo-bisubstitution is the organic reaction of carbonyl compounds with amines to imines. The reaction name is based on the IUPAC Nomenclature for Transformations. The reaction is acid catalyzed and the reaction type is nucleophilic addition of the amine to the carbonyl compound followed by transfer of a proton from nitrogen to oxygen to a stable hemiaminal or carbinolamine. With primary amines, water is lost in an elimination reaction to an imine. With aryl amines, especially stable Schiff bases are formed.

== Reaction mechanism ==
The reaction steps are reversible reactions and the reaction is driven to completion by removal of water e.g. by azeotropic distillation, molecular sieves or titanium tetrachloride. Primary amines react through an unstable hemiaminal intermediate which then splits off water.

Secondary amines do not lose water easily because they do not have a proton available and instead they often react further to an aminal:

or when an α-carbonyl proton is present to an enamine:

In acidic environment the reaction product is an iminium salt by loss of water.

This reaction type is found in many Heterocycle preparations for example the Povarov reaction and the Friedländer-synthesis to quinolines.

== Intramolecular substitution ==
Compounds containing both a primary or secondary amine and carbonyl functional group are often labile. This guideline applies to amino aldehydes, amino-ketones, and amino-esters; indeed a molecule cannot carry simultaneously (unprotected) aldehyde and amine groups. Aminoacetone, the simplest amino ketone, cannot be isolated as a liquid or solid, and 2-aminobenzaldehyde oligomerizes in solution or in the melt. An α-formyl aziridine, reduced with DIBAL from the ester, reversibly (Note: When reacting with sodium borohydride, the dimer reforms the monomer, and so must be in equilibrium with the latter.) dimerizes to (Note: The high aziridine strain geometrically inhibits elimination to form an iminium ion.) an oxazolidine:

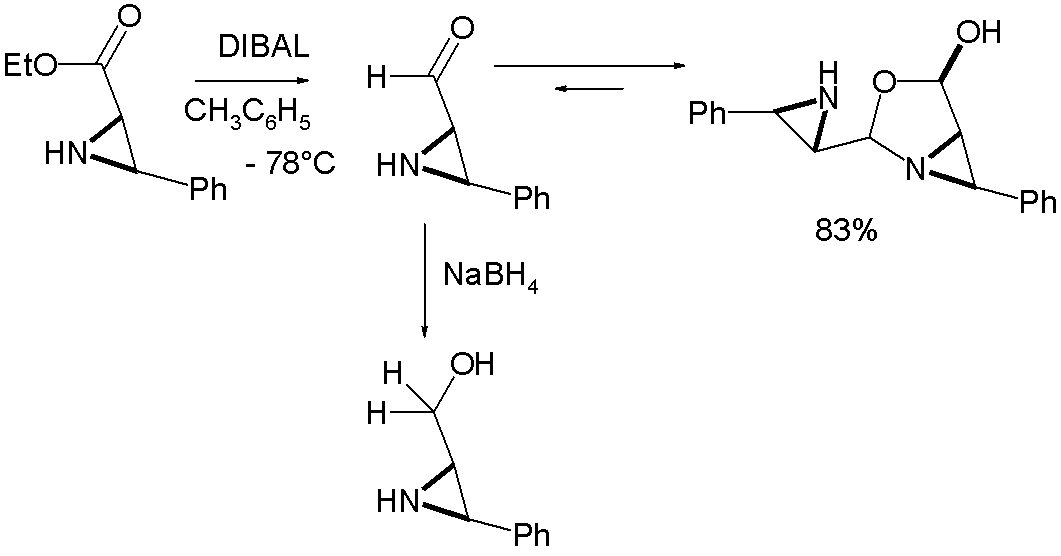
Formyl Aziridine Reactivity

== Related reactions ==
Hydrazines and hydroxylamines displace carbonyl oxygens much more readily than amines. Their equilibria strongly favor the dehydrated product, and the carbonyl is recovered only with difficulty.
