= Digitonin =

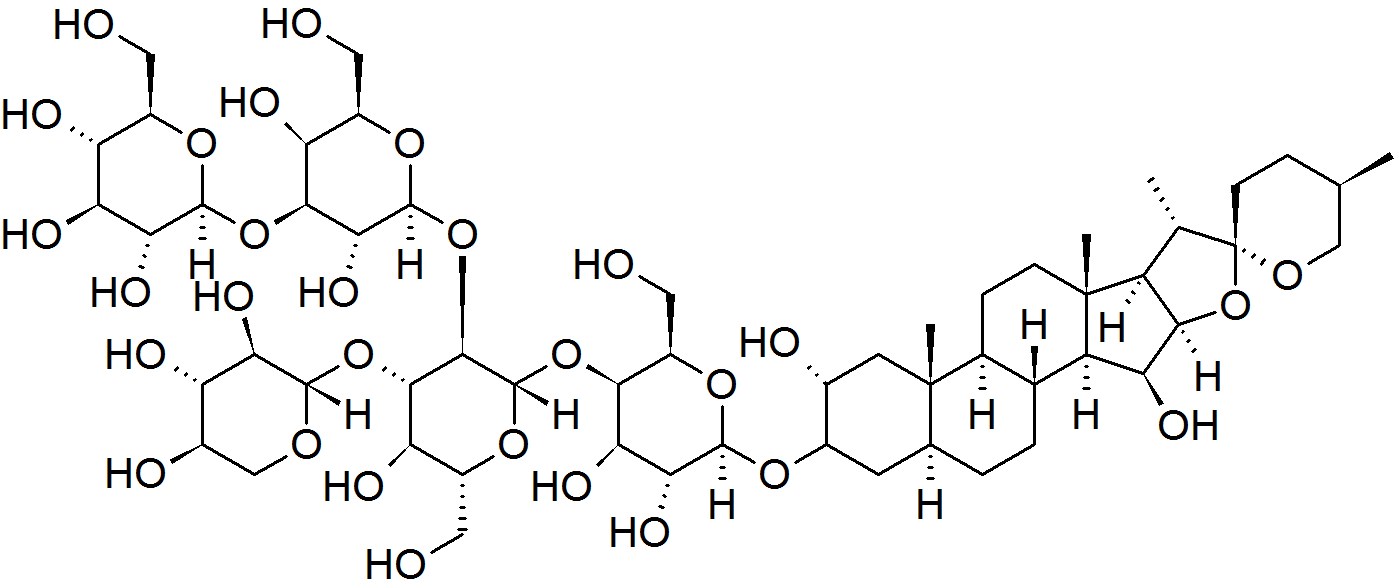
- Chemical structure of digitonin

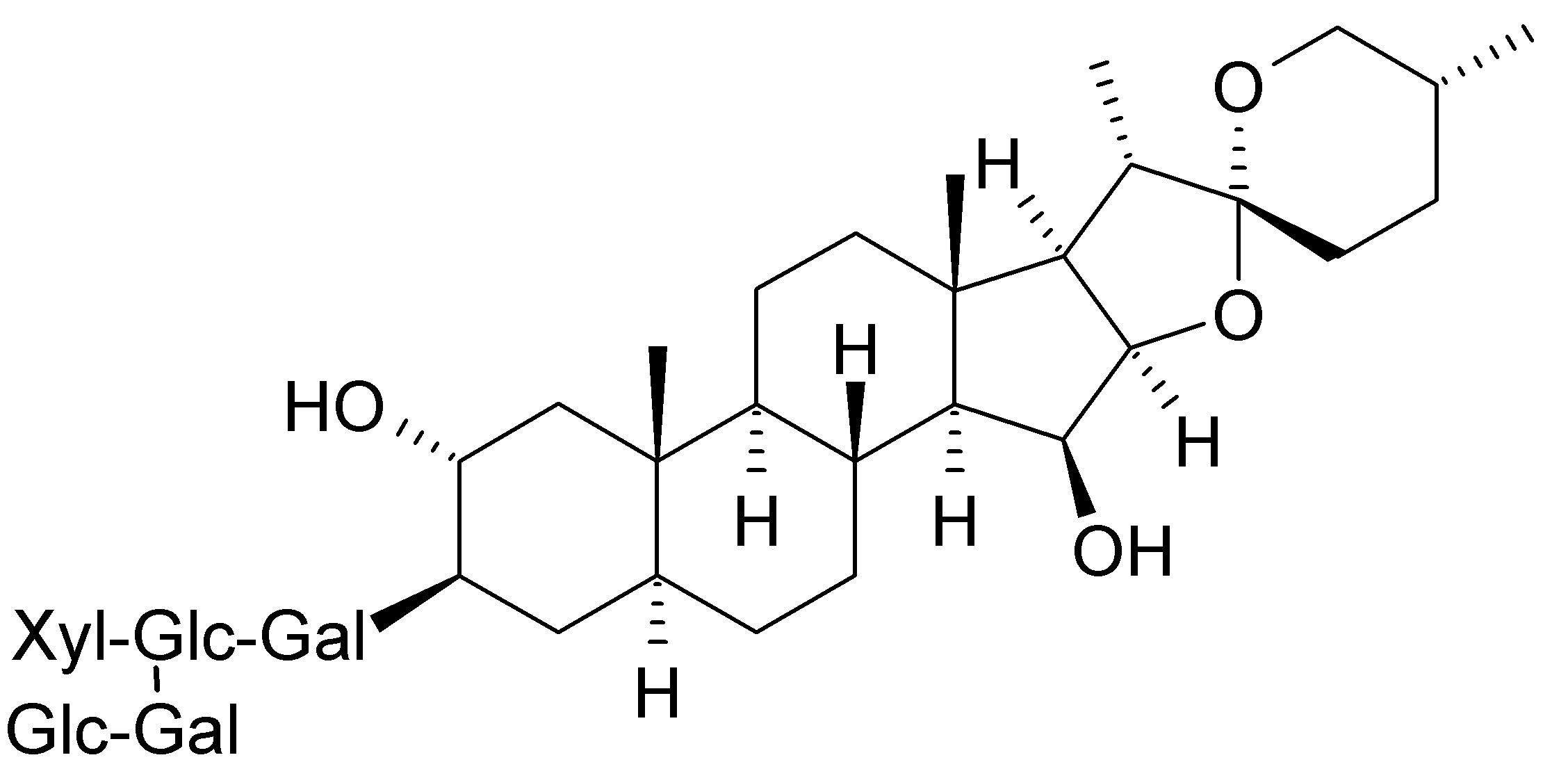
- Alternate depiction using sugar abbreviations (Gal = galactose, Glc = glucose, Xyl = xylose

Names
- Other names Digitin

Identifiers
CAS Number	11024-24-1
3D model (JSmol)	Interactive image
ChEBI	CHEBI:27729
ChEMBL	ChEMBL404811
ChemSpider	23753
ECHA InfoCard	100.031.129
EC Number	234-255-6
KEGG	C00765
PubChem CID	25444
UNII	KOO5CM684H
CompTox Dashboard (EPA)	DTXSID1025065
- InChI: InChI=1S/C56H92O29/c1-19-7-10-56(75-17-19)20(2)31-45(85-56)37(67)32-22-6-5-21-11-26(24(61)12-55(21,4)23(22)8-9-54(31,32)3)76-50-42(72)39(69)44(30(16-60)80-50)81-53-48(47(36(66)29(15-59)79-53)83-49-40(70)33(63)25(62)18-74-49)84-52-43(73)46(35(65)28(14-58)78-52)82-51-41(71)38(68)34(64)27(13-57)77-51/h19-53,57-73H,5-18H2,1-4H3/t19-,20+,21+,22-,23+,24-,25-,26-,27-,28-,29-,30-,31+,32-,33+,34-,35+,36?,37+,38+,39-,40-,41-,42-,43-,44+,45-,46+,47+,48-,49+,50-,51+,52+,53+,54-,55+,56-/m1/s1 Key: UVYVLBIGDKGWPX-YCCXZQINSA-N; InChI=1/C56H92O29/c1-19-7-10-56(75-17-19)20(2)31-45(85-56)37(67)32-22-6-5-21-11-26(24(61)12-55(21,4)23(22)8-9-54(31,32)3)76-50-42(72)39(69)44(30(16-60)80-50)81-53-48(47(36(66)29(15-59)79-53)83-49-40(70)33(63)25(62)18-74-49)84-52-43(73)46(35(65)28(14-58)78-52)82-51-41(71)38(68)34(64)27(13-57)77-51/h19-53,57-73H,5-18H2,1-4H3/ t19-,20+,21+,22-,23+,24-,25-,26-,27-,28-,29-,30-,31+,32-,33+,34-,35+,36?,37+,38+,39-,40-,41-,42-,43-,44+,45-,46+,47+,48-,49+,50-,5 1+,52+,53+,54-,55+,56-/m1/s1
- SMILES: O[C@@H]%11[C@@H](O)[C@H](O)[C@H](O[C@H]%11O[C@@H]1[C@@H](O)[C@@H](O[C@H](CO)[C@@H]1O)O[C@@H]%10[C@@H](O[C@@H]2OC[C@@H](O)[C@H](O)[C@H]2O)C(O)[C@H](O[C@H]%10O[C@@H]3[C@H](O)[C@@H](O)[C@@H](O[C@@H]3CO)O[C@H]9[C@H](O)C[C@@]8(C)[C@@H](CC[C@@H]6[C@@H]8CC[C@@]7([C@@H]5[C@@H](O[C@@]4(OC[C@@H](CC4)C)[C@H]5C)[C@@H](O)[C@@H]67)C)C9)CO)CO

Properties
Chemical formula	C_{56}H_{92}O_{29}
Molar mass	1229.323 g·mol^{−1}
Appearance	White to off-white powder
Melting point	244.0–248.5 °C (471.2–479.3 °F; 517.1–521.6 K)
Chiral rotation ([α]_{D})	-40° (589.3 nm; 20 °C)

Hazards
- Lethal dose or concentration (LD, LC)
LD_{50} (median dose)	23 mg/kg (rat, intravenous) 4 mg/kg (mouse, intravenous)
- Except where otherwise noted, data are given for materials in their standard state (at 25 °C [77 °F], 100 kPa). verify (what is ?) Infobox references

Digitonin is a steroidal saponin (saraponin) obtained from the foxglove plant Digitalis purpurea. Its aglycone is digitogenin, a spirostan steroid. It has been investigated as a detergent, as it effectively water-solubilizes lipids. As such, it has several potential membrane-related applications in biochemistry, including solubilizing membrane proteins, precipitating cholesterol, and permeabilizing cell membranes.

Digitonin is sometimes confused with the cardiac drugs digoxin and digitoxin; all three can be extracted from the same source.

Commercial digitonin preparations can often contain other congeners including tigonin, gitonin, digalonin, and desglucodigitonin.

== Chemical properties ==
- Critical micelle concentration = < 0.5 mM
- Average micellar weight = 70000
- Aggregation number = 60
