= Diisobutylaluminium hydride =

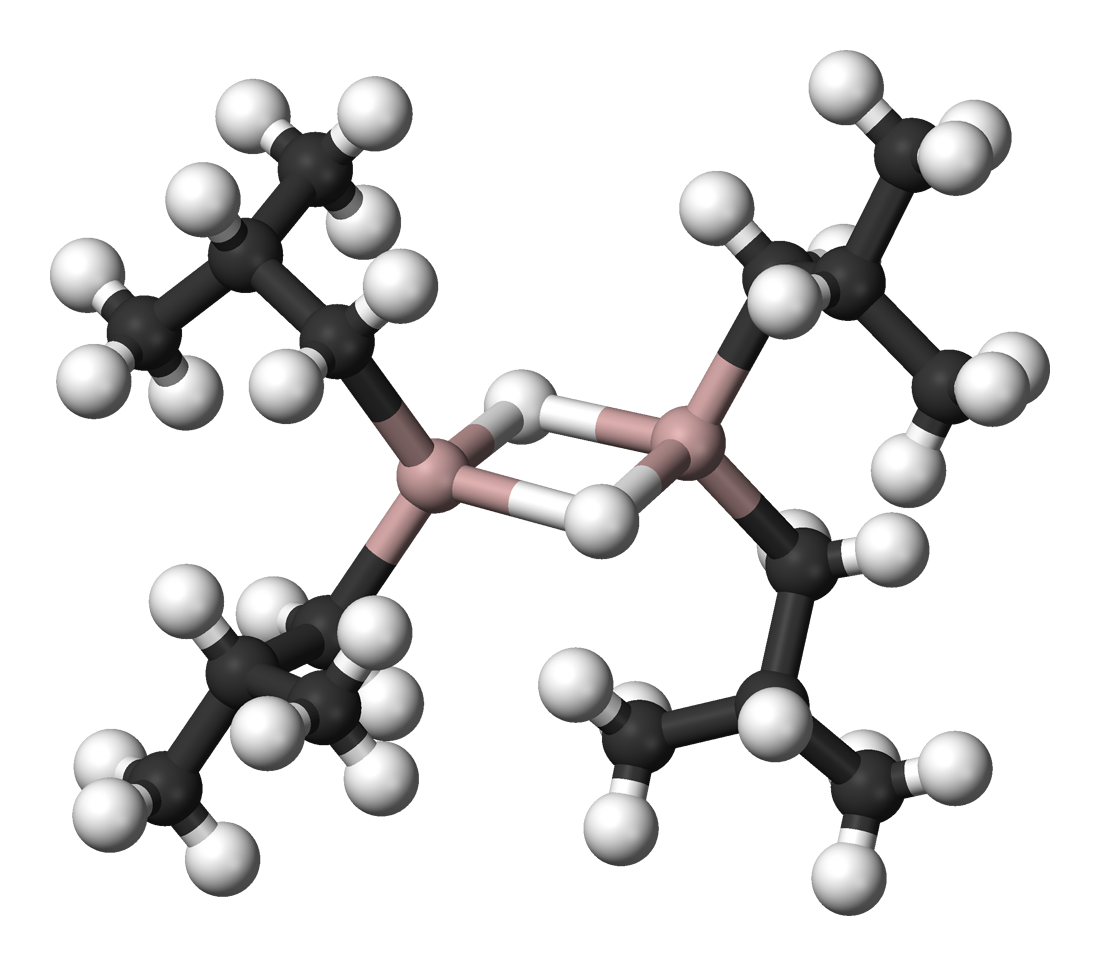

Names
- IUPAC name Diisobutylaluminium hydride
- Other names DIBAH; DIBAL; DiBAlH; DIBAL-H; DIBALH

Identifiers
CAS Number	1191-15-7
3D model (JSmol)	Interactive image
ChemSpider	10430352
ECHA InfoCard	100.013.391
EC Number	214-729-9
PubChem CID	16682954 (monomer); 131737379 (dimer)
UNII	H2EJ47H11A
CompTox Dashboard (EPA)	DTXSID4041866
- InChI: InChI=1S/2C4H9.Al.H/c2*1-4(2)3;;/h2*4H,1H2,2-3H3;; Key: AZWXAPCAJCYGIA-UHFFFAOYSA-N; InChI=1/2C4H9.Al.H/c2*1-4(2)3;;/h2*4H,1H2,2-3H3;;/rC8H19Al/c1-7(2)5-9-6-8(3)4/h7-9H,5-6H2,1-4H3 Key: AZWXAPCAJCYGIA-DFAADSFOAF
- SMILES: CC(C)C[AlH]CC(C)C

Properties
Chemical formula	C_{8}H_{19}Al (monomer); C_{16}H_{38}Al_{2} (dimer)
Molar mass	142.22 g/mol (monomer); 284.44 g/mol (dimer)
Appearance	Colorless liquid
Density	0.798 g/cm^{3}
Melting point	−80 °C (−112 °F; 193 K)
Boiling point	116 to 118 °C (241 to 244 °F; 389 to 391 K) at 1 mmHg
Solubility in water	Reacts with water
Solubility	Soluble in hydrocarbons, THF, and ether

Hazards
- Occupational safety and health (OHS/OSH)
Main hazards	ignites in air
- GHS labelling
Pictograms	(GHS02: Flammable) (GHS05: Corrosive)
Signal word	Danger
Hazard statements	H220, H225, H250, H260, H314
Precautionary statements	P210, P222, P223, P231+P232, P233, P240, P241, P242, P243, P260, P264, P280, P301+P330+P331, P302+P334, P303+P361+P353, P304+P340, P305+P351+P338, P310, P321, P335+P334, P363, P370+P378, P377, P381, P402+P404, P403, P403+P235, P405, P422, P501

Structure
Point group	C_{2h}
- Except where otherwise noted, data are given for materials in their standard state (at 25 °C [77 °F], 100 kPa). verify (what is ?) Infobox references

Diisobutylaluminium hydride (DIBALH, DIBAL, DIBAL-H or DIBAH) is a reducing agent with the formula (i-Bu_{2}AlH)_{2}, where i-Bu represents isobutyl (-CH_{2}CH(CH_{3})_{2}). This organoaluminium compound is a reagent in organic synthesis.

== Properties ==
Like most organoaluminum compounds, the compound's structure is most probably more than that suggested by its empirical formula. A variety of techniques, not including X-ray crystallography, suggest that the compound exists as a dimer and a trimer, consisting of tetrahedral aluminium centers sharing bridging hydride ligands. Hydrides are small and, for aluminium derivatives, are highly basic, thus they bridge in preference to the alkyl groups.

DIBAL can be prepared by heating triisobutylaluminium (itself a dimer) to induce β-hydride elimination:

(i-Bu_{3}Al)_{2} → (i-Bu_{2}AlH)_{2} + 2 (CH_{3})_{2}C=CH_{2}

Although DIBAL can be purchased commercially as a colorless liquid, it is more commonly purchased and dispensed as a solution in an organic solvent such as toluene or hexane.

== Use in organic synthesis ==
DIBAL reacts slowly with electron-poor compounds and more quickly with electron-rich compounds. Thus, it is an electrophilic reducing agent whereas LiAlH_{4} can be thought of as a nucleophilic reducing agent.

DIBAL is useful in organic synthesis for a variety of reductions, including converting carboxylic acids, their derivatives, and nitriles to aldehydes. DIBAL efficiently reduces α-β unsaturated esters to the corresponding allylic alcohol. By contrast, LiAlH_{4} reduces esters and acyl chlorides to primary alcohols, and nitriles to primary amines [using Fieser work-up procedure]. Similarly, DIBAL reduces lactones to hemiacetals (the equivalent of an aldehyde).

Although DIBAL reliably reduces nitriles to aldehydes, the reduction of esters to aldehydes is infamous for often producing large quantities of alcohols. Nevertheless, it is possible to avoid these unwanted byproducts through careful control of the reaction conditions using continuous flow chemistry.

DIBALH was investigated originally as a cocatalyst for the polymerization of alkenes.

== Safety ==
DIBAL, like most alkylaluminium compounds, reacts violently with air and water, potentially leading to explosion.
