= Wieland-Gumlich aldehyde =

Names
- IUPAC name (1S,9S,10R,11R,12E,17S)-12-(2-hydroxyethylidene)-8,14-diazapentacyclo[9.5.2.0^{1,9}.0^{2,7}.0^{14,17}]octadeca-2,4,6-triene-10-carbaldehyde
- Other names Caracurine VII, Deacetyldiaboline

Identifiers
CAS Number	hemiacetal: 466-85-3
3D model (JSmol)	Interactive image
ChEBI	CHEBI:141968
ChemSpider	30668088
PubChem CID	15756612
UNII	hemiacetal: X3Q09D1K96
- InChI: InChI=1S/C19H22N2O2/c22-8-5-12-10-21-7-6-19-15-3-1-2-4-16(15)20-18(19)14(11-23)13(12)9-17(19)21/h1-5,11,13-14,17-18,20,22H,6-10H2/b12-5-/t13-,14+,17-,18-,19+/m0/s1 Key: ZOMKIDXZHXWPCN-DYAJAIQSSA-N; InChI=1/C19H22N2O2/c22-8-5-12-10-21-7-6-19-15-3-1-2-4-16(15)20-18(19)14(11-23)13(12)9-17(19)21/h1-5,11,13-14,17-18,20,22H,6-10H2/b12-5-/t13-,14+,17-,18-,19+/m0/s1 Key: ZOMKIDXZHXWPCN-DYAJAIQSBC
- SMILES: C1CN2C/C(=C/CO)/[C@@H]3C[C@H]2[C@@]14[C@H]([C@@H]3C=O)NC5=CC=CC=C45

Properties
Chemical formula	C_{19}H_{22}N_{2}O_{2}
Molar mass	310.397 g·mol^{−1}
- Except where otherwise noted, data are given for materials in their standard state (at 25 °C [77 °F], 100 kPa). Infobox references

The so-called Wieland-Gumlich aldehyde (6) is an indoline derived by chemical degradation from strychnine. This compound is of some commercial interest as a chemical intermediate. It was first synthesized in 4 steps from strychnine (1) by Walter Gumlich and Koozoo Kaziro working in the laboratory of Heinrich Wieland. This degradation study was part of an attempt to elucidate the chemical structure of strychnine.

This degradation takes place through conversion of strychnine to the oxime 2 using amyl nitrite, Beckmann fragmentation of 2 to the carbamic acid 3 by use of thionyl chloride, decarboxylation of 3 to nitrile 4, and nucleophilic displacement of cyanide by barium hydroxide to give hemiacetal 5, which is in equilibrium with the Wieland-Gumlich aldehyde (6).

The Wieland-Gumlich aldehyde reverts to strychnine in a single reaction using malonic acid, acetic anhydride and sodium acetate in acetic acid.

The Wieland-Gumlich aldehyde has been used in the industrial synthesis of alcuronium chloride (Alloferin) via dimerization.
