= Camphorsulfonic acid =

Wireframe model of camphorsulfonic acid
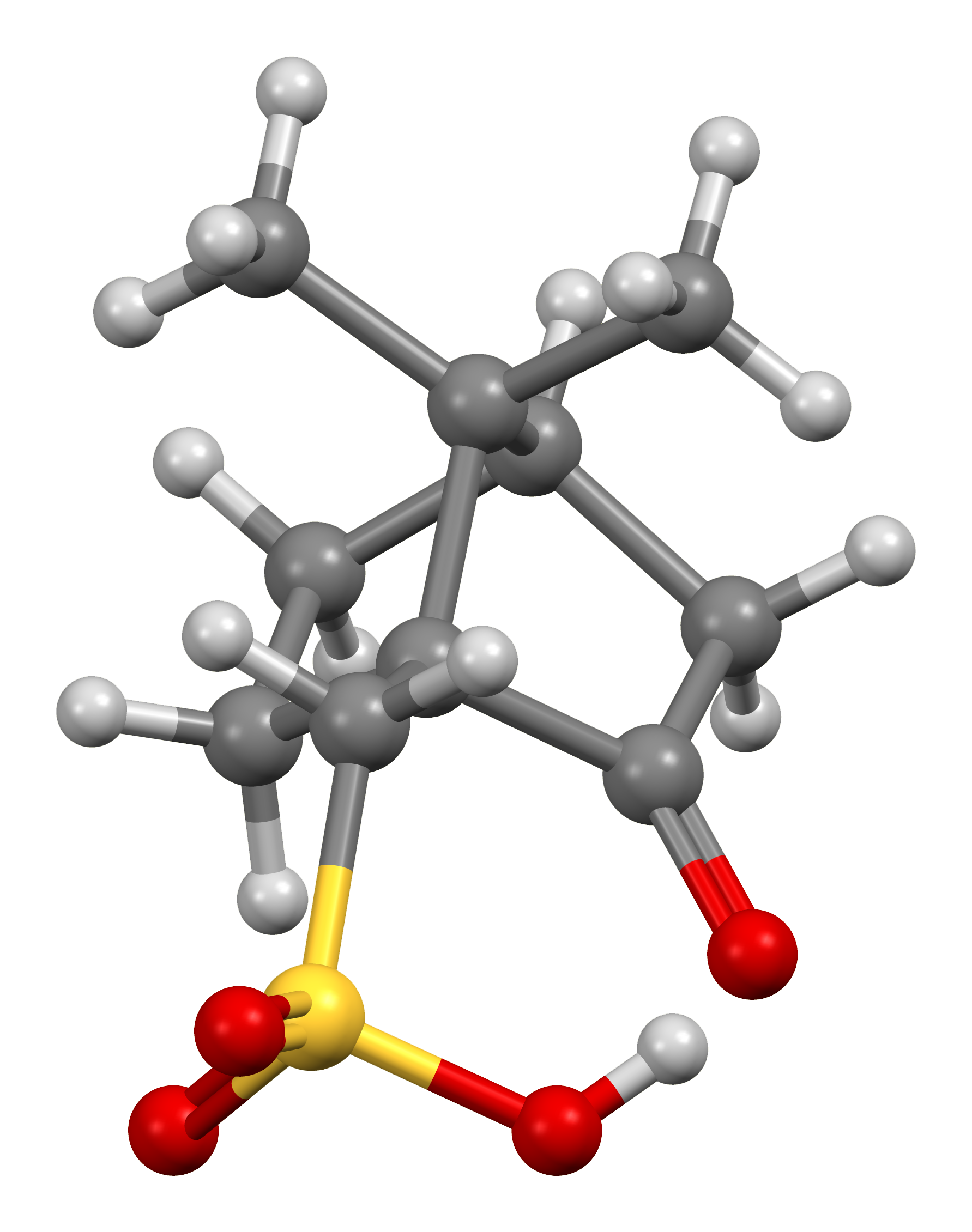

Names
- Preferred IUPAC name (7,7-dimethyl-2-oxobicyclo[2.2.1]heptan-1-yl)methanesulfonic acid
- Other names Reychler's acid; 2-Oxobornane-10-sulfonic acid

Identifiers
CAS Number	5872-08-2; 35963-20-3 (1R); 3144-16-9 (1S)
3D model (JSmol)	Interactive image; Interactive image
Beilstein Reference	2216194
ChEBI	CHEBI:55379
ChemSpider	17438; 116050 (1R); 189449 (1S); 2318313 (4S)
ECHA InfoCard	100.025.024
EC Number	227-527-0
MeSH	10-Camphorsulfonic+acid
PubChem CID	18462; 131278 (1R); 218580 (1S); 43833349 (4R); 3057042 (4S)
UNII	D8D049375Q; Y6075I4FXE (1R); 9TLZ01S15L (1S)
UN number	1759
CompTox Dashboard (EPA)	DTXSID60863113
- InChI: InChI=1S/C10H16O4S/c1-9(2)7-3-4-10(9,8(11)5-7)6-15(12,13)14/h7H,3-6H2,1-2H3,(H,12,13,14) Key: MIOPJNTWMNEORI-UHFFFAOYSA-N
- SMILES: CC1(C2CCC1(C(=O)C2)CS(=O)(=O)O)C; O=S(=O)(O)CC12C(=O)CC(CC1)C2(C)C

Properties
Chemical formula	C_{10}H_{16}O_{4}S
Molar mass	232.29 g·mol^{−1}
Melting point	195 °C (decomposes)
Acidity (pK_{a})	1.2

Hazards
Safety data sheet (SDS)	External MSDS
- Except where otherwise noted, data are given for materials in their standard state (at 25 °C [77 °F], 100 kPa). verify (what is ?) Infobox references

Camphorsulfonic acid, sometimes abbreviated CSA or 10-CSA is an organosulfur compound. Like typical sulfonic acids, it is a relatively strong acid that is a colorless solid at room temperature and is soluble in water and a wide variety of organic substances.

This compound is commercially available. It can be prepared by sulfonation of camphor with sulfuric acid and acetic anhydride:

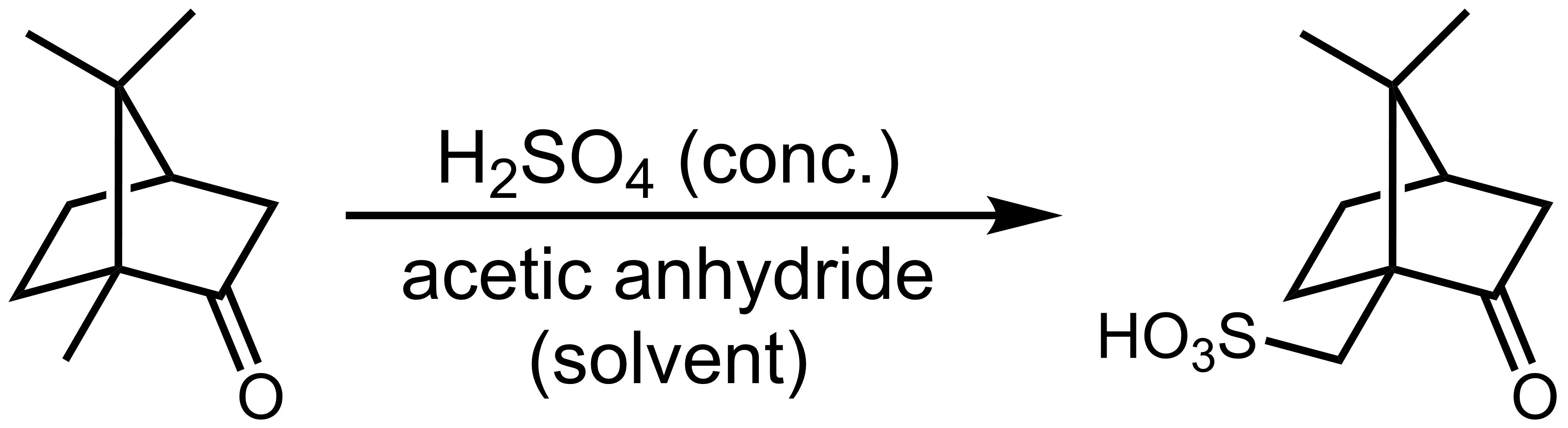

Although this reaction appears to be a sulfonation of an unactivated methyl group, the actual mechanism is believed to involve a retro-semipinacol rearrangement, deprotonation next to the tertiary carbocation to form an alkene, sulfonation of the alkene intermediate, and finally, semipinacol rearrangement to re-establish the ketone function.

In organic synthesis, CSA and its derivatives can be used as resolving agents for chiral amines and other cations. The synthesis of osanetant was an example of this. 3-bromocamphor-8-sulfonic acid was used in the synthesis of enantiopure devazepide.

Camphorsulfonic acid is also being used for the synthesis of quinolines. Camphorsulfonic acid is used in some pharmaceutical formulations, where is it referred to as camsilate or camsylate, including trimetaphan camsilate and lanabecestat camsylate. Some studies (c.f. Lednicer) support that D-CSA was used for the resolution of Chloramphenicol.
