= 1,1-Dimethyldiborane =

Names
- Preferred IUPAC name 1,1-Dimethyldiborane(6)
- Other names Unsymmetrical dimethyldiborane

Identifiers
CAS Number	16924-32-6
3D model (JSmol)	Interactive image
CompTox Dashboard (EPA)	DTXSID10593296
- InChI: InChI=1S/C2H10B2/c1-4(2)5-3-6-4/h3H2,1-2H3 Key: KEWIJCBOFAPULG-UHFFFAOYSA-N
- SMILES: C[B]1(C)[H][BH2][H]1

Properties
Chemical formula	C_{2}H_{10}B_{2}
Molar mass	55.72 g·mol^{−1}
Appearance	Colorless gas
Melting point	−150.2 °C (−238.4 °F; 123.0 K)
Boiling point	−4 °C (25 °F; 269 K)
Solubility in organic solvents	Soluble in ether, pentane, tetrahydrofuran

Thermochemistry
Std enthalpy of formation (Δ_{f}H^{⦵}_{298})	-25 kcal/mol

Hazards
NFPA 704 (fire diamond)	2 2

Related compounds
Related alkyl boranes	Methyldiborane; Trimethyldiborane; Tetramethyldiborane; Trimethylborane; Diethyldiborane
- Except where otherwise noted, data are given for materials in their standard state (at 25 °C [77 °F], 100 kPa). (what is ?) Infobox references

1,1-Dimethyldiborane is the organoboron compound with the formula (CH_{3})_{2}B(μ-H)_{2}BH_{2}. A pair of related 1,2-dimethyldiboranes are also known. It is a colorless gas that ignites in air.

== Formation ==
The methylboranes were first prepared by H. I. Schlesinger and A. O. Walker in the 1930s. Methylboranes are formed by the reaction of diborane and trimethylborane. This reaction produces four different substitution of methyl with hydrogen on diborane. Produced are 1-methyldiborane, 1,1-dimethyldborane, 1,1,2-trimethyldiborane, and 1,1,2,2-tetramethyldiborane.

Tetramethyl lead reacts with diborane in a 1,2-dimethoxyethane solvent at room temperature to make a range of methyl substituted diboranes, ending up at trimethylborane, but including 1,1-dimethyldiborane, and trimethyldiborane. The other outputs of the reaction are hydrogen gas and lead metal.

Other methods to form methyldiboranes include heating trimethylborane with hydrogen. Alternatively trimethylborane reacts with borohydride salts with in the presence of hydrogen chloride, aluminium chloride, or boron trichloride. If the borohydride is sodium borohydride, then methane is a side product. If the metal is lithium then no methane is produced. dimethylchloroborane and methyldichloroborane are also produced as gaseous products.

When Cp_{2}Zr(CH_{3})_{2} reacts with borane dissolved in tetrahydrofuran, a borohydro group inserts into the zirconium carbon bond, and methyl diboranes are produced.

In ether dimethylcalcium reacts with diborane to produce dimethyldiborane and calcium borohydride:

Ca(CH_{3})_{2} + 2 B_{2}H_{6} → Ca(BH_{4})_{2} + B_{2}H_{4}(CH_{3})_{2}

1,2-dimethyldiborane slowly converts on standing to 1,1-dimethyldiborane.

Gas chromatography can be used to determine the amounts of the methyl boranes in a mixture. The order they elute are diborane, monomethyldiborane, trimethylborane, 1,1-dimethyldiborane, 1,2-dimethyldiborane, trimethyldiborane, and finally tetramethyldiborane.

== Selected properties ==
1,1-Dimethyldiborane has a dipole moment of 0.87 d. The predicted heat of formation for the liquid is ΔH^{0}_{f}=-31 kcal/mol, and for the gas -25 kcal/mol. Heat of vapourisation was measured at 5.5 kcal/mol.

== Reactions ==
At −78.5 °C, methyldiborane disproportionates slowly, first to diborane and 1,1-dimethyldiborane. In solution methylborane is more stable against disproportionation than dimethylborane.

2 MeB_{2}H_{5} → 1,1-Me_{2}B_{2}H_{4} + B_{2}H_{6}, K = 2.8, Me = CH_{3}
3 [1,1-Me_{2}B_{2}H_{4}] → 2 Me_{3}B_{2}H_{3} + B_{2}H_{6}, K = 0.00027

Trimethyldiborane partially disproportionates over a period of hours at room temperature to yield tetramethyldiborane and 1,2-dimethyldiborane. Over a period of weeks 1,1-dimethyldiborane appears as well.

Gentler oxidation of 1,1-dimethyldiborane at 80 °C yields 2,5-dimethyl-1,3,4-trioxadiboralane, a volatile liquid that contains a ring of two boron and three oxygen atoms. An intermediate in this reaction is two molecules of dimethylborylhydroperoxide (CH_{3})_{2}BOOH. (CAS 41557-62-5) When methyldiborane is oxidised around 150 °C a similar substance methyltrioxadiboralane is produced. At the same time dimethyltrioxadiboralane and trimethylboroxine are also formed, and also hydrocarbons, diborane, hydrogen, and dimethoxyborane (dimethyl methylboronic ester).
