= Tetramethyldiborane =

Names
- IUPAC name Tetramethyldiborane(6)
- Other names Dimethylborane dimer

Identifiers
CAS Number	21482-59-7
3D model (JSmol)	Interactive image
- InChI: InChI=1S/C4H14B2/c1-5(2)7-6(3,4)8-5/h1-4H3 Key: DAOILNUAERZCST-UHFFFAOYSA-N; InChI=1/C4B2H14/c1-5(2)7-6(3,4)8-5/h1-4H3
- SMILES: C[B]1(C)[H][B](C)(C)[H]1

Properties
Chemical formula	(CH_{3})_{2}BH_{2}B(CH_{3})_{2}
Molar mass	83.777
Appearance	Colorless liquid
Odor	Pungent;
Melting point	−72.5 °C (−98.5 °F; 200.7 K)
Boiling point	68.6 °C (155.5 °F; 341.8 K)

Hazards
NFPA 704 (fire diamond)	2 2

Related compounds
Related alkyl boranes	trimethylborane dimethyldiborane diethylborane
Related compounds	Borane tetramethyl aluminium hydride tetramethyl gallium hydride methylalane
- Except where otherwise noted, data are given for materials in their standard state (at 25 °C [77 °F], 100 kPa). (what is ?) Infobox references

Dimethylborane, (CH_{3})_{2}BH is the simplest dialkylborane, consisting of a methyl group substituted for a hydrogen in borane. As for other boranes it normally exists in the form of a dimer called tetramethyldiborane or tetramethylbisborane or TMDB ((CH_{3})_{2}BH)_{2}. Other combinations of methylation occur on diborane, including monomethyldiborane, trimethyldiborane, 1,2-dimethylborane, 1,1-dimethylborane and trimethylborane. At room temperature the substance is at equilibrium between these forms. The methylboranes were first prepared by H. I. Schlesinger and A. O. Walker in the 1930s.

== Properties ==
Tetramethyldiborane has two boron atoms linked by a two hydrogen atom bridge, and each boron is linked to two methyl groups. A tetramethyldiborane molecule belongs to the D_{2h} point group. Its infrared spectrum shows a strong absorption band at 1602 cm^{−1} due to bridging hydrogen, a weak band at 1968 cm^{−1} and lines due to methyl between 900 and 1400 cm^{−1}. In the molecule the boron to hydrogen distance is 1.36 Å, the boron to boron distance is 1.84 Å; the boron to carbon distance is 1.590 Å; the angle of boron-boron to carbon is 120.0°; the boron-carbon-hydrogen angle is 112.0°. The NMR J coupling between two boron-11 nuclei in tetramethyldiborane is 55 Hz.

Tetramethyldiborane melts at −72.5 °C and boils at 68.6 °C. Vapour pressure is approximated by Log P = 7.687−(1643/T). Tetramethyldiborane has a vapour pressure of 48 mm Hg at 0 °C. Heat of vapourisation was measured at 7.3 kcal/mol. The predicted heat of formation for the liquid is ΔH^{0}_{f}=−65 kcal/mol, and for the gas −57 kcal/mol.

A gas chromatograph can be used to determine the amounts of the methyl boranes in a mixture. The order they pass through are diborane, monomethyldiborane, trimethylborane, 1,1-dimethyldiborane, 1,2-dimethyldiborane, trimethyldiborane, and lastly tetramethyldiborane.

The nuclear resonance shift for the bridge hydrogen is 8.90 ppm, compared to 10.49 for diborane.

== Preparation ==
Dimethylborane is formed when lithium dimethylborohydride Li(CH_{3})_{2}BH_{2} reacts with an acid. The lithium dimethylborohydride can be made from a dimethylborinic ester and lithium monoethoxy aluminium hydride.

Methylboranes are also formed by the reaction of diborane and trimethylborane. This reaction produces four different substitutions of methyl with hydrogen on diborane. Produced is 1-methyldiborane, 1,1-dimethyldborane, 1,1,2-trimethyldiborane and 1,1,2,2-tetramethyldiborane. The latter is maximised when trimethylborane is six times the concentration of diborane.

Other methods to form methyldiboranes include reacting hydrogen with trimethylborane between 80 and 200 °C under pressure, or reacting a metal borohydride with trimethylborane in the presence of hydrogen chloride, aluminium chloride or boron trichloride. If the borohydride is sodium borohydride, then methane is a side product. If the metal is lithium then no methane is produced. dimethylchloroborane and methyldichloroborane are also produced as gaseous products.

Atomic hydrogen converts trimethylborane on a graphene monolayer surface to dimethylborane which dimerises to tetramethyldiborane.

== Reactions ==
Dimethylborane reacts with alkenes with the highest yield in ether to produce a dimethylalkylborane. The dimethylalkylboranes can then be converted to a tertiary alcohol by oxidative carbonylation. This requires heating to 150° with carbon monoxide under 50 bars of pressure, and then oxidation with hydrogen peroxide.

Methylboranes such as tetramethyldiborane disproportionate in the gas phase to trimethylborane and diborane at room temperature. The time period is on the order of a few hours, and disproportionation is faster the higher the temperature. At 0 °C disproportionation takes about a day. At −78.5 °C methyldiborane disproportionates slowly first to diborane and 1,1-dimethyldiborane. In solution methylborane is more stable against disproportionation than dimethylborane.

4(CH_{3})_{3}B_{2}H_{3} ⇌ (CH_{3})_{4}B_{2}H_{2} + B_{2}H_{6} K=0.0067.
3B_{2}H_{2}Me_{4} ⇌ 2 B_{2}H_{3}Me_{3} + 2 BMe_{3}

Dimethylborane is hydrolyzed in water to Dimethylborinic acid (CH_{3})_{2}BOH.

Dimethyldiborane spontaneously inflames when exposed to air.

Ammonia and tetramethyldiborane combine to form a white solid at −78 °C. The solid decomposes above 10 °C. The structure of the solid is ionic [(CH_{3})_{2}B(NH_{3})_{2}]^{+} [(CH_{3})_{2}BH_{2}]^{−}. A simple adduct BHMe_{3}.NH_{3} is formed from tetramethyldiborane and ammonia in ether. This also forms during the thermal decomposition of the diammoniate.

Acetonitrile reacts slowly with tetramethyldiborane at room temperature to form dimeric ethylideneaminodimethylborane (CH_{3}CH=NB(CH_{3})_{2})_{2}. This has a cis and a trans isomer, one melting at 76 °C and another at −5 °C.

Tetramethyldiborane reacts with sodium in liquid ammonia to make a salt with formula Na_{2}HB(CH_{3})_{2} called sodium dimethylboryl. The salt is white and stable to 90 °C. With potassium K_{2}HB(CH_{3})_{2} potassium dimethylboryl is formed. Calcium metal react with tetramethyldiborane to make CaHB(CH_{3})_{2}.NH_{3}.

Tetramethyldiborane combines with dimethylphosphine to yield an adduct of dimethylborane.

Tetramethyldiborane reacts with organic borates to form methylboronic esters.

2 (CH_{3})_{4}B_{2}H_{2} + 4 B(OR)_{3} ⇌ 6 CH_{3}(OR)_{2} + (CH_{3})_{2}B_{2}H_{4}.

Tetramethyldiborane acts as a catalyst to enable the same results from trimethylborane:

(CH_{3})_{3}B + 2 B(OR)_{3} → 3 CH_{3}(OR)_{2}

== Related ==
The tetramethylborate anion (CH_{3})_{4}B^{−} only has one boron atom.
