= Methyldiborane =

Names
- IUPAC name Methyldiborane
- Other names monomethyldiborane methylated diborane boraethane

Identifiers
CAS Number	23777-55-1
3D model (JSmol)	Interactive image
CompTox Dashboard (EPA)	DTXSID70593297
- InChI: InChI=1S/CH8B2/c1-3-4-2-5-3/h3H,2H2,1H3 Key: ALTSFFGCORZGRQ-UHFFFAOYSA-N
- SMILES: C[BH]1[H][BH2][H]1

Properties
Chemical formula	CH_{3}BH_{3}BH_{2}
Molar mass	41.70 g mol^{−1}
Appearance	Colorless gas
Density	0.546 at -126°
Boiling point	−43 °C (−45 °F; 230 K)

Related compounds
Related alkyl boranes	dimethyldiborane trimethyldiborane tetramethyldiborane trimethylborane ethyldiborane
Related compounds	Diborane
- Except where otherwise noted, data are given for materials in their standard state (at 25 °C [77 °F], 100 kPa). (what is ?) Infobox references

Methyldiborane, CH_{3}B_{2}H_{5}, or monomethyldiborane is the simplest of alkyldiboranes, consisting of a methyl group substituted for a hydrogen in diborane. As with other boranes it exists in the form of a dimer with a twin hydrogen bridge that uses three-center two-electron bonding between the two boron atoms, and can be imagined as methyl borane (CH_{3}BH_{2}) bound to borane (BH_{3}). Other combinations of methylation occur on diborane, including 1,1-dimethylborane, 1,2-dimethyldiborane, trimethyldiborane, tetramethyldiborane, and trimethylborane (which is not a dimer). At room temperature the substance is at equilibrium between these molecules.

The methylboranes were first prepared by H. I. Schlesinger and A. O. Walker in the 1930s.

== Formation ==
Methylboranes are formed by the reaction of diborane and trimethylborane. This reaction produces four different substitution of methyl with hydrogen on diborane. Produced is 1-methyldiborane, 1,1-dimethyldborane, 1,1,2-trimethyldiborane and 1,1,2,2-tetramethyldiborane. The reaction is complex. At 0 °C when diborane is in excess, monomethyldiborane is initially produced, coming to a steady but low level, and 1,1-dimethyldiborane level increases over a long time, until all trimethylborane is consumed. Monomethyldiborane ends up at equilibrium with a mixture of diborane and dimethyldiborane. At 0° the equilibrium constant for 2B_{2}H_{5}Me ←→ B_{2}H_{6} + (BH_{2}Me)_{2} is around 0.07, so monomethyldiborane will typically be the majority of the mixture, but there will still be a significant amount of diborane and dimethyldiborane present. Monomethyldiborane yield is best with a ratio of 4 of diborane to 1 of trimethylborane. The yield of trimethyldiborane is maximised with ratio of 1 of diborane to 3 of trimethylborane.

When methyllithium reacts with diborane, monomethyldiborane is produced in about a 20% yield.

Tetramethyl lead can react with diborane in a 1,2-dimethoxyethane solvent at room temperature to make a range of methyl substituted diboranes, ending up at trimethylborane, but including 1,1-di, tridiborane. The other outputs of the reaction are hydrogen gas and lead metal.

Other methods to form methyldiboranes include reacting hydrogen with trimethylborane between 80 and 200 °C under pressure, or reacting a metal borohydride with trimethylborane in the presence of hydrogen chloride, aluminium chloride or boron trichloride. If the borohydride is sodium borohydride, then methane is a side product. If the metal is lithium then no methane is produced. dimethylchloroborane and methyldichloroborane are also produced as gaseous products.

When Cp_{2}Zr(CH_{3})_{2} reacts with borane dissolved in tetrahydrofuran, a borohydro group inserts into the zirconium carbon bond, and methyl diboranes are produced.

When trimethylgallium reacts with diborane at -45°, methyldiborane is produced along with dimethylgallium borohydride.

2(CH_{3})_{3}Ga + B_{2}H_{6} → (CH_{3})_{2}GaBH4 + CH_{3}B_{2}H_{5}.

At room temperature trimethylgallium reacts with diborane to make a volatile substance that decomposes to gallium metal along with methyldiborane.

(CH_{3})_{3}Ga + 3B_{2}H_{6} → Ga + 3CH_{3}B_{2}H_{5} +1.5H_{2}.

== Properties ==
The compound boils at −43 °C. Methyldiborane liquid has a density of 0.546 g/ml at −126° At −78.5 the vapour pressure is 55 torr.

Methyldiborane HCH_{3}BH_{2}BH_{2} has one methyl group and a hydrogen on a boron atom. The other boron atom is only bound to hydrogen atoms. A bridge of two hydrogen atoms links the boron atoms together. The methyldiborane molecule has the following measurements: B^{1} is the boron atom not attached to the methyl group and B^{2} is the boron atom that has methyl group attached, and H^{μ} is one of the bridge hydrogen atoms between the boron atoms. The distance between boron atoms is 1.82 Å, Distance between boron atoms and bridging hydrogen atoms is 1.34 Å. Distances to non bridging hydrogens from B^{1} are 1.195 and 1.187 Å. B^{2} distance to non bridging hydrogen is 1.2 Å. Distance between two bridging hydrogen atoms is 1.96 Å. The carbon to boron bond is 1.49 Å long. The angle subtended from the bridging hydrogens to the boron to boron axis is 47°. The angle of carbon to the boron-boron axis is 120°. The dipole moment of methyldiborane is 0.56 D. It has a vapour pressure of 61 mm Hg at −77.2 °C. The predicted heat of formation for the liquid is ΔH^{0}_{f}=−14 kcal/mol, and for the gas −9 kcal/mol.

A gas chromatograph can be used to determine the amounts of the methyl boranes in a mixture. The order they pass through are diborane, monomethyldiborane, trimethylborane, 1,1-dimethyldiborane, 1,2-dimethyldiborane, trimethyldiborane, and last tetramethyldiborane.

The nuclear resonance shift for the bridge hydrogen is 10.09 ppm, compared to 10.49 for diborane.

== Reactions ==
At -78.5 °C methyldiborane disproportionates slowly first to diborane and 1,1-dimethyldiborane. In solution methylborane is more stable against disproportionation than dimethylborane.

2MeB_{2}H_{5} ⇌ 1,1-Me_{2}B_{2}H_{4} + B_{2}H_{6} K=2.8 Me=CH_{3}.

By reacting methyldiborane with ether, dimethylether borine is formed (CH_{3})_{2}O.BH_{3} leaving methylborane which rapidly dimerises to 1,2-dimethyldiborane.

Methyldiborane is hydrolyzed in water to methylboronic acid CH_{3}B(OH)_{2}. Methyldiborane reacts with trimethylamine to yield solid derivatives trimethylamine-methylborane (CH_{3})_{3}N—BHCH_{3} and trimethylamine-borane (CH_{3})_{3}N—BH_{3}.

Methyldiborane is pyrophoric, spontaneously inflaming when exposed to air.

When methyldiborane is oxidised around 150 °C a substance 2-methyl-1,3,4-trioxadiboralane is produced. This is a ring of three oxygen atoms and two boron atoms, with methyl attached to one boron atom. At the same time dimethyltrioxadiboralane and trimethylboroxine are also formed, and also hydrocarbons, diborane, hydrogen, and dimethoxyborane (dimethyl methylboronic ester).

When methyldiborane, or dimethyldiborane is combined with ammonia, aminodimethylborine (NH_{2}BMe_{2}) is formed and on heating around 180 °C B-methyl borazoles are produced. These borazoles can have zero, one, two or three methyl groups substituted on the boron atoms (B_{3}N_{3}H_{6}, MeB_{3}N_{3}H_{5}, Me_{2}B_{3}N_{3}H_{4} or Me_{3}B_{3}N_{3}H_{3}).

A specific way to make 1,2-dimethyldiborane is to react methyldiborane with a sufficient amount of a Lewis base. This will strip off borane to combine with the Lewis base, and let two methyl borane molecules dimerise.

Methyldiborane can methylate tetraborane.

CH_{3}B_{2}H_{5} + B_{4}H_{10} → 2-CH_{3}B_{4}H_{9} + B_{2}H_{6}

== Related ==
Bis(trimethylphosphine) methyldiborane is an adduct of methyldiborane formed when methylpentaborane (1-CH_{3}B_{5}H_{8} or 2-CH_{3}B_{5}H_{8}) is reacted with trimethylphosphine.

== Extra reading ==
- Carpenter, J. H.; Jones, W. J.; Jotham, R. W.; Long, L. H. (1968). "Laser-source Raman spectroscopy and the Raman spectra of the methyldiboranes". Chemical Communications (15): 881. doi:10.1039/C19680000881.
- Lehmann, Walter J.; Wilson, Charles O.; Shapiro, I. (1960). "Infrared Spectra of Alkyldiboranes. I. Monomethyldiboranes". The Journal of Chemical Physics. 32 (4): 1088. Bibcode:1960JChPh..32.1088L. doi:10.1063/1.1730853.
- Crompton, T. R. (6 December 2012). Gas Chromatography of Organometallic Compounds. Springer. pp. 80–83. ISBN 978-1-4684-4226-7. methyldiborane in a gas chromatograph
- Penn, R. E.; Buxton, L. W. (1977). "Microwave spectrum of methyldiborane". The Journal of Chemical Physics. 67 (2): 831. Bibcode:1977JChPh..67..831P. doi:10.1063/1.434845.
- Davidson, G. (1973). "Elements of Group III". In C. C. Addison (ed.). Inorganic Chemistry of the Main-Group Elements. Royal Society of Chemistry. p. 57. ISBN 978-0-85186-752-6. Infrared lines
- Isadore Shapiro; C. O. Wilson; J. F. Ditter; W. J. Lehmann (1961). "Mass Spectrometry in Boron Chemistry" (PDF). Borax to Boranes. Advances in Chemistry Series. Vol. 32. American Chemical Society. pp. 135–136. doi:10.1021/ba-1961-0032.ch014. ISBN 978-0-8412-0033-3. mass spectroscopy
- Kapshtal, V. N.; Sverdlov, L. M. (November 1968). "Sum rules for the frequencies and squares of the frequencies of the vibrations in methyl-substituted diborane derivatives". Soviet Physics Journal. 11 (11): 120–122. Bibcode:1968SvPhJ..11k.120K. doi:10.1007/BF00816081. S2CID 121517718.
