= Trimethyldiborane =

Names
- IUPAC name 1,1,2-Trimethyldiborane
- Other names Trimethyldiborane(6)

Identifiers
CAS Number	21107-27-7
3D model (JSmol)	Interactive image
PubChem CID	171041182
CompTox Dashboard (EPA)	DTXSID301315061
- InChI: InChI=1S/C3H12B2/c1-4-6-5(2,3)7-4/h4H,1-3H3 Key: JDPNBQILNNVWNW-UHFFFAOYSA-N
- SMILES: C[B]1(C)[H][BH](C)[H]1

Properties
Chemical formula	(CH_{3})_{3}B_{2}H_{3}
Molar mass	69.75 g mol^{−1}
Appearance	Colorless pyrophoric liquid
Melting point	−122.9 °C (−189.2 °F; 150.2 K)
Boiling point	45.5 °C (113.9 °F; 318.6 K)

Thermochemistry
Std enthalpy of formation (Δ_{f}H^{⦵}_{298})	48 kcal/mol

Related compounds
Related alkyl boranes	trimethylborane tetramethyldiborane dimethyldiborane methyldiborane
- Except where otherwise noted, data are given for materials in their standard state (at 25 °C [77 °F], 100 kPa). (what is ?) Infobox references

Trimethyldiborane, (CH_{3})_{3}B_{2}H_{3} is a molecule containing boron carbon and hydrogen. It is an alkylborane, consisting of three methyl group substituted for a hydrogen in diborane. It can be considered a mixed dimer: (CH_{3})_{2}BH_{2}BH(CH_{3}) or dimethylborane and methylborane. called 1,2-dimethyldiborane. Other combinations of methylation occur on diborane, including monomethyldiborane, 1,2-dimethyldiborane, tetramethyldiborane, 1,1-dimethylborane and trimethylborane. At room temperature the substance is at equilibrium between these forms, so it is difficult to keep it pure. The methylboranes were first prepared by H. I. Schlesinger and A. O. Walker in the 1930s.

== Formation ==
Trimethylborane is formed by the reaction of diborane and trimethylborane. This reaction produces four different substitution of methyl with hydrogen on diborane. Produced is 1-methyldiborane, 1,1-dimethyldborane, 1,1,2-trimethyldiborane and 1,1,2,2-tetramethyldiborane. By reacting monomethyldiborane with ether, dimethylether borine is formed [(CH_{3})_{2}O].BH_{3} leaving methylborane which rapidly dimerises to 1,2-dimethyldiborane. The reaction is complex. The yield of trimethyldiborane is maximised with ratio of 1 of diborane to 3 of trimethylborane.

Tetramethyl lead can react with diborane in a 1,2-dimethoxyethane solvent at room temperature to make a range of methyl substituted diboranes, ending up at trimethylborane, but including 1,1-di, tridiborane. The other outputs of the reaction are hydrogen gas and lead metal.

Other methods to form methyldiboranes include reacting hydrogen with trimethylborane between 80 and 200 °C under pressure, or reacting a metal borohydride with trimethylborane in the presence of hydrogen chloride, aluminium chloride or boron trichloride. If the borohydride is sodium borohydride, then methane is a side product. If the metal is lithium then no methane is produced. Dimethylchloroborane and methyldichloroborane are also produced as gaseous products.

When Cp_{2}Zr(CH_{3})_{2} reacts with borane dissolved in tetrahydrofuran, a borohydro group inserts into the zirconium carbon bond, and methyl diboranes are produced.

== Properties ==
Trimethyldiborane has two methyl groups on one boron atom, and one methyl and a hydrogen on the second boron atom. A bridge of two hydrogen atoms links the boron atoms together. The molecule is expected to have a C_{s} point group due to rapid rotation of the methyls. The infrared spectrum of trimethyldiborane has a strong absorption band at 2509 cm^{−1} due to the non-bridge boron-hydrogen bond. It has a vapour pressure of 51 mm Hg at -22.8 °C; 61 mm Hg at -18.4 °C and 83 mm Hg at 0 °C. Vapour pressure can be approximated by Log P = 7.673 - (1527/T). The boiling point is 45.5 °C, and the melting point is -122.9.

The predicted heat of formation for liquid trimethyldiborane is ΔH^{0}_{f}=-48 kcal/mol, and for the gas -41 kcal/mol. Heat of vapourisation ΔH_{vap} was measured at 7.0 kcal/mol.

A gas chromatograph can be used to determine the amounts of the methyl boranes in a mixture. The order they pass through are diborane, monomethyldiborane, trimethylborane, 1,1-dimethyldiborane, 1,2-dimethyldiborane, trimethyldiborane, and lastly tetramethyldiborane.

The nuclear resonance shift for the bridge hydrogen is 9.27 ppm, compared to 10.49 for diborane.

== Reactions ==
Trimethyldiborane partially disproportionates over a period of hours at room temperature to yield tetramethyldiborane and 1,2-dimethyldiborane. Over a period of weeks 1,1-dimethyldiborane appears as well.

3[1,1-(CH_{3})_{3}B_{2}H_{4}] ⇌ 2 (CH_{3})_{3}B_{2}H_{3} + B_{2}H_{6} K=0.00027
4(CH_{3})_{3}B_{2}H_{3} ⇌ (CH_{3})_{4}B_{2}H_{2} + B_{2}H_{6} K=0.0067

Trimethyldiborane is hydrolyzed in water to methylboronic acid CH_{3}B(OH)_{2} and dimethylborinic acid (CH_{3})_{2}B(OH).

Trimethyldiborane spontaneously inflames when exposed to air.

Trimethyldiborane reacts with liquid ammonia initially forming methylborohydride anions and (CH_{3})_{2}B(N_{3})_{2}^{+} cations.

== Related ==
Trimethylborane (CH_{3})_{3}B has a similar-sounding name, and many similar properties, but only has one boron atom. Trimethylhydroborate (CH_{3})_{3}BH^{−} is an anion with one boron atom. It can form a lithium salt.

== Extra reading ==
- Carpenter, J. H.; Jones, W. J.; Jotham, R. W.; Long, L. H. (1968). "Laser-source Raman spectroscopy and the Raman spectra of the methyldiboranes". Chemical Communications (15): 881. doi:10.1039/C19680000881.
