= Nickel boride catalyst =

Catalyst composed of nickel and boron

Nickel boride is the common name of materials composed chiefly of the elements nickel and boron that are widely used as catalysts in organic chemistry. Their approximate chemical composition is Ni_{2.5}B, and they are often incorrectly denoted "Ni_{2}B" in organic chemistry publications.

Nickel boride catalysts are typically prepared by reacting a salt of nickel with sodium borohydride. The composition and properties vary depending on the specific preparation method. The two most common forms, described and evaluated in detail by Herbert C. Brown and Charles Allan Brown in 1963, are known as P−1 nickel and P−2 nickel.

These catalysts are usually obtained as black granules (P−1) or colloidal suspensions (P−2). They are air-stable, non-magnetic and non-pyrophoric, but slowly react with water to form nickel hydroxide Ni(OH)_{2}. They are insoluble in all solvents, but react with concentrated mineral acids. They are claimed to be more effective hydrogenation catalysts than Raney nickel.

== History ==
These catalysts originate during World War II with the work of a research group led by Hermann I. Schlesinger, discoverer of borohydrides. They noted that reaction of Sodium borohydride NaBH_{4} with salts of certain transition metals yielded black precipitates, and that the cobalt product catalyzed the decomposition of borohydride. However, their research was focused on war-related applications, and the black precipitate was not investigated further.

In 1951, Raymond Paul and others investigated the reaction of NaBH_{4} with nickel chloride, sulfate, and acetate in various solvents and measured their performance as hydrogenation catalysts.

In 1963, H. C. Brown and Charles A. Brown reported the synthesis and performance of two similar catalysts, which they denoted by "P-1" (the same as Paul's) and "P-2", obtained by reacting sodium borohydride with nickel acetate in water and ethanol, respectively.

== Preparation ==
In contrast with other borides, which require high temperatures, preparation of these nickel boride catalysts can be carried out at ambient temperature, without special equipment. Indeed, they are usually generated in situ.

The P−1 catalyst can be generated by reacting a nickel(II) salt, such as sulfate, chloride, nitrate, or acetate, and sodium borohydride in alkaline aqueous solutions. The product precipitates as a fine, black granular powder. The chemistry is very similar to that of electroless nickel-boron plating, and yields hydrogen gas and the corresponding sodium salt as byproducts. The borohydride must be added gradually to the nickel salt solution, not the other way around, because the product catalyzes the hydrolysis of borohydride to hydrogen and hypoborate BO^{−}_{2}. The catalytic activity of P-1 is enhanced by adding small amount of salts of other metals (but not cobalt) to the nickel salt during preparation. Benzene however reduces its activity somewhat.

The P−2 form is prepared similarly from nickel(II) acetate and sodium borohydride in ethanol. An inert atmosphere was found necessary for maximum catalytic activity. The result was an almost colloidal suspension of the black catalyst. Another method uses nickel chloride NiCl_{2} instead of acetate.

== Structure and composition ==
The P-1 and P-2 "nickel boride" catalyst have been suggested to be amorphous compounds, composed of nickel bonded to individual boron centres. However, that structure was later found to be incorrect.

An X-ray diffraction analysis of P-1 by L. Hofer and others in 1964 indicated that the nickel and boron contents were in 2.5:1 ratio, but the solid contained 11% of strongly bound water and other compounds. was amorphous when freshly prepared (with crystalline nanoparticles about 1.5 nm across), but even heating at 90 °C caused the formation of some crystalline nickel. Heating at 250 °C caused it to separate into two phases: metallic nickel, and crystalline trinickel boride Ni_{3}B with the cementite structure, stable at least up to 750 C. No trace of the true dinickel boride Ni_{2}B was seen. The authors concluded that P-1 was an intimate mixture of metallic nickel and some amorphous boron-containing compound.

The true structure of these "nickel borides" was elucidated only in 2007. They consist of small grains of crystalline nickel boride embedded in an amorphous nickel matrix.

The two forms P−1 and P−2 differ in terms of amount of their contamination by NaBO_{2} adsorbed on the surface. P−1 Ni_{2}B has an oxide to boride ratio of 1:4, whereas that of P−2 Ni_{2}B is 10:1. Their properties differ in terms of catalytic efficiency and substrate specificity.

== Applications ==
Ni_{2}B is an efficient catalyst and reducing agent. It is used as a heterogeneous hydrogenation catalyst.

=== Catalytic hydrogenation ===
The catalytic activity of P−1 is insensitive to steric hindrance of side chains on the substrate and thus more active, and seldom affects protecting groups. In contrast, P−2 is very sensitive to steric factors. For these reasons, P−1 is usually used for the complete reduction of unsaturated hydrocarbons under mild conditions, while P−2 is useful in partial reductions such as converting alkynes to alkenes in high yields:

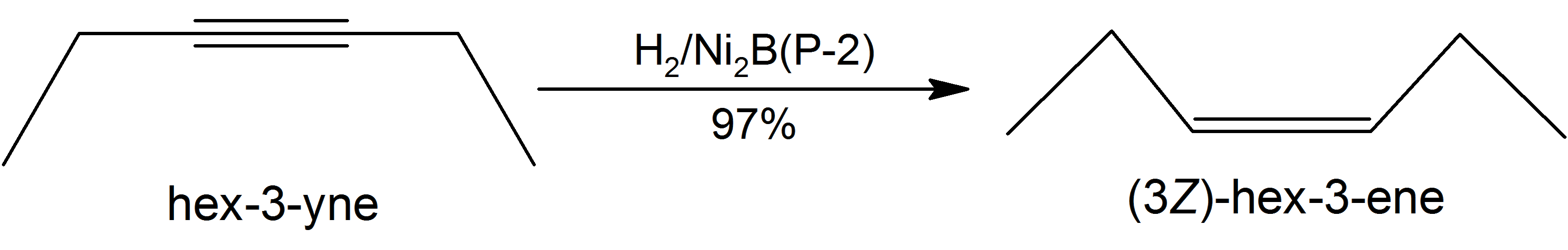

The H_{2}/Ni_{2}B system will not hydrogenolyse ethers, alcohols, aldehydes, amines and amides as it reduces alkenes in preference, even under forcing conditions. It leaves epoxides unaffected, but affects cyclopropanes occasionally. Most esters are stable to Ni_{2}B, except for benzylic, allylic and propargylic esters which are cleaved by hydrogenolysis:

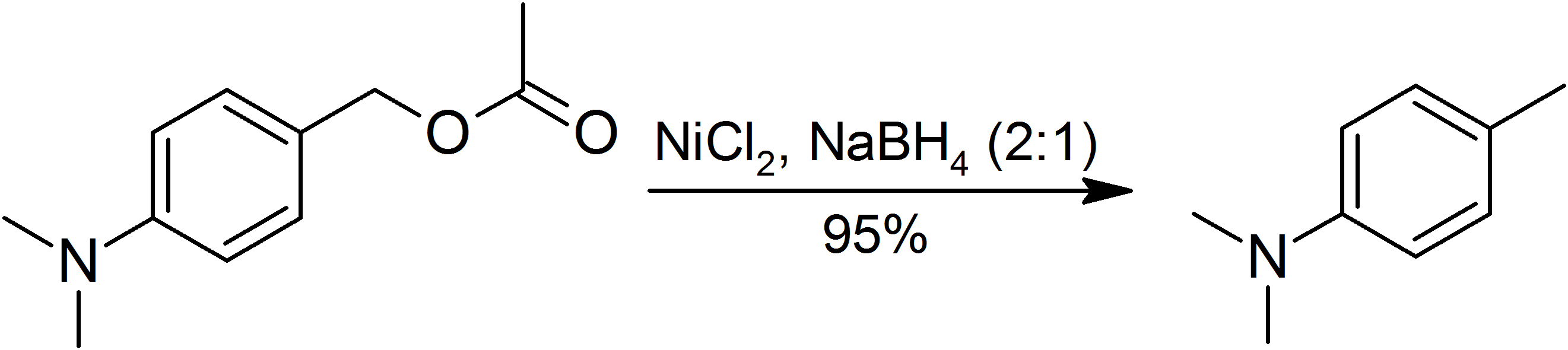

=== Desulfurization ===
The NiCl_{2}/NaBH_{4} system desulfurizes thioamides, thioethers, thioesters, thiols and sulfides. Organic sulfides, disulfides, thiols, and sulfoxides are reduced by NiCl_{2}/NaBH_{4} to hydrocarbons. Illustrated is the reduction of phenothiazine to diphenylamine:

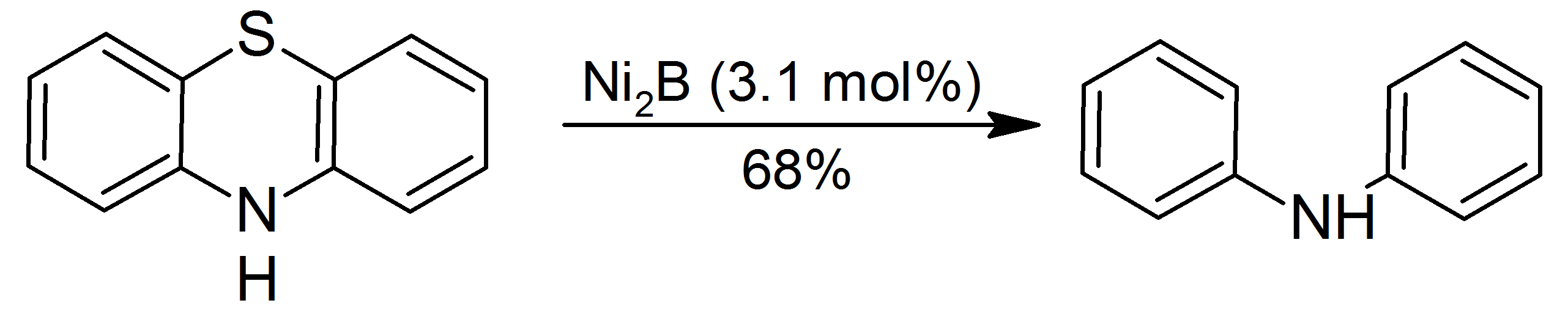

Ni_{2}B can also be used to cleave thioacetals. Since Ni_{2}B is non-pyrophoric, stable in air, and give high yields in many cases, it is proposed as a safer alternative to Raney Nickel for removal of cyclic thioacetals. Desulfurization catalyzed by Ni_{2}B proved to occur with retention of configuration by isotopic labeling.

=== Reduction of nitrogenous groups ===
The NiCl_{2}/NaBH_{4} system reduces aliphatic nitro groups, nitriles and oximes completely to amines. For aryl amines, nitrobenzenes are converted to anilines, and azoxybenzenes to azobenzenes. Azides are cleanly reduced to amines in preference to sterically hindered aliphatic nitro groups:

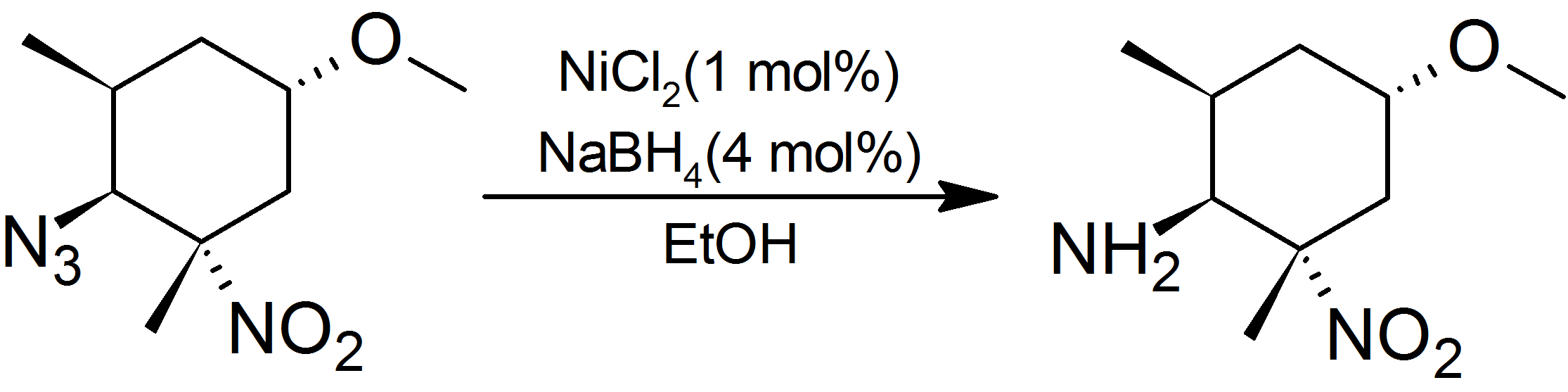

=== Dehalogenation ===
Most organic fluorides and chlorides are unaffected by Ni_{2}B, bromides show variable reactivity, and iodides are often completely reduced to hydrocarbons. With Ni_{2}B in dimethylformamide, α-bromoketones are reduced to the parent ketones. Vicinal bromides are dehalogenated to alkenes:

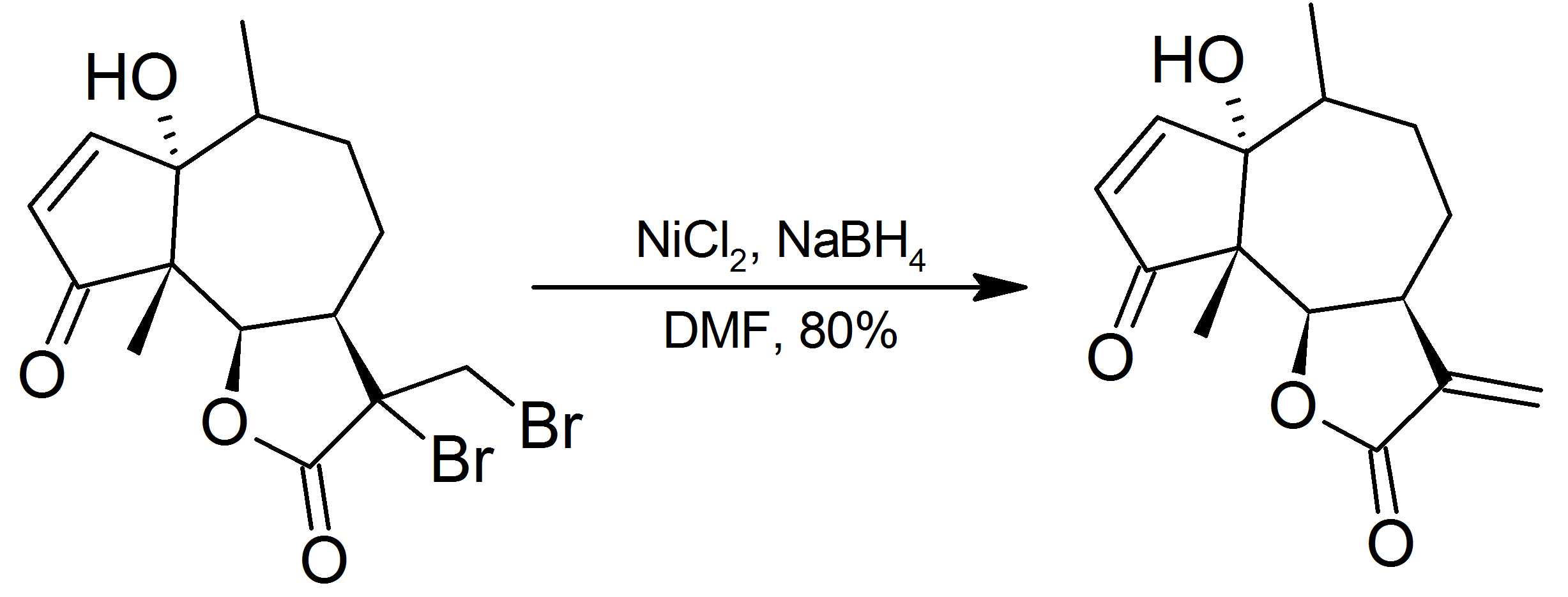

For aryl bromides, the modified system Ni(PPh_{3})_{3}Cl_{2}/NaBH_{4} in dimethylformamide is used for clean debromination. Reductive cleavage of iodides occurs with retention of configuration.

== Safety ==
Nickel compounds are possible carcinogens and contact with skin should be avoided. Particular care should be taken whenever NiCl_{2}/NaBH_{4} is used in dimethylformamide as sodium borohydride may spontaneously ignite in dimethylformamide.

== See also ==
- Cobalt boride
- Urushibara nickel
