= C2H10B2 =

The molecular formula C_{2}H_{10}B_{2} (molar mass: 55.72 g/mol, exact mass: 56.0969 u) may refer to:

- 1,1-Dimethyldiborane
- 1,2-Dimethyldiborane
