= 1,2-Dimethyldiborane =

- cis-1,2-Dimethyldiborane

- trans-1,2-Dimethyldiborane

Names
- Preferred IUPAC name 1,2-Dimethyldiborane(6)
- Other names Symmetrical dimethyldiborane

Identifiers
CAS Number	17156-88-6
3D model (JSmol)	Interactive image
- InChI: InChI=1S/C2H10B2/c1-3-5-4(2)6-3/h3-4H,1-2H3 Key: CMZSWMSJMMTTMF-UHFFFAOYSA-N
- SMILES: C[BH]1[H][BH](C)[H]1

Properties
Chemical formula	(CH_{3}BH_{2})_{2}
Molar mass	55.72 g mol^{−1}
Appearance	Colorless gas
Melting point	−124.9 °C (−192.8 °F; 148.2 K)
Boiling point	4 °C (39 °F; 277 K)
- Except where otherwise noted, data are given for materials in their standard state (at 25 °C [77 °F], 100 kPa). (what is ?) Infobox references

1,2-Dimethyldiborane is an organoboron compound with the formula [(CH_{3})BH_{2}]_{2}. Structurally, it is related to diborane, but with methyl groups replacing terminal hydrides on each boron. It is the dimer of methylborane, CH_{3}BH_{2}, the simplest alkylborane. 1,2-Dimethyldiborane can exist in a cis- and a trans arrangement. 1,2-Dimethyldiborane is an easily condensed, colorless gas that ignites spontaneously in air.

An isomer of 1,2-dimethyldiborane is 1,1-dimethyldiborane, known as unsymmetrical dimethyldiborane, which has two methyl groups on one boron atom. Other methylated versions of diborane including methyldiborane, trimethyldiborane, tetramethyldiborane. Trimethylborane exists as a monomer.

== Preparation ==
Methylboranes were first prepared by H. I. Schlesinger and A. O. Walker in the 1930s.

In a more modern synthesis, 1,2-dimethyldiborane is produced by treating lithium methylborohydride with hydrogen chloride:

2 LiCH_{3}BH_{3} + 2 HCl → (CH_{3}BH_{2})_{2} + 2 H_{2} + 2 LiCl

Instead of hydrogen chloride, methyl iodide or trimethylsilyl chloride can be used.

Lithium methylborohydride can be made by treating methylboronic esters with lithium aluminium hydride.

=== Miscellaneous routes ===
Methylboranes arise the reaction of diborane and trimethylborane. This reaction produces 1-methyldiborane, 1,1-dimethyldiborane, 1,1,2-trimethyldiborane, and 1,1,2,2-tetramethyldiborane. By treating monomethyldiborane with ether, dimethyl ether borane (CH_{3})_{2}O.BH_{3} leaving methylborane which rapidly dimerises to 1,2-dimethyldiborane. The reaction is complex.

Tetramethyl lead reacts with diborane to give a range of methyl-substituted diboranes, ending up at trimethylborane, but including 1,1-dimethyldiborane, and trimethyldiborane. Other products are hydrogen gas and lead metal.

Other methods to form methyldiboranes include treating hydrogen with trimethylborane between 80 and 200 °C under pressure, or treating a metal borohydride with trimethylborane in the presence of hydrogen chloride, aluminium chloride or boron trichloride. If the borohydride is sodium borohydride, then methane is a side product. If the metal is lithium, then no methane is produced. dimethylchloroborane and methyldichloroborane are also produced as gaseous products.

When Cp_{2}Zr(CH_{3})_{2} reacts with diborane, a borohydro group inserts into the zirconium-carbon bond, and methyl diboranes are produced.

In ether dimethylcalcium reacts with diborane to produce dimethyldiborane and calcium borohydride:

Ca(CH_{3})_{2} + 2 B_{2}H_{6} → Ca(BH_{4})_{2} + B_{2}H_{4}(CH_{3})_{2}

1,2-Dimethyldiborane is produced by the room temperature disproportionation of trimethyldiborane.

== Physical and spectroscopic properties ==
cis-1,2-Dimethyldiborane melts at −132.5 °C; trans-1,2-dimethyldiborane melts at −102 °C. The cis-1,2-dimethyldiborane molecule has point group C_{s}. A trans-1,2-dimethyldiborane molecule has point group C_{2}. Unsymmetrical dimethyldiborane melts at −150.2 °C. Vapour pressure is approximated by Log P = 7.363−(1212/T). The vapour pressure for the symmetrical isomer is given by Log P = 7.523−(1290/T).

Gas chromatography can be used to determine the amounts of the methyl boranes in a mixture. The order of elution are: diborane, monomethyldiborane, trimethylborane, 1,1-dimethyldiborane, 1,2-dimethyldiborane, trimethyldiborane, and last tetramethyldiborane.

The nuclear resonance shift for the bridge hydrogen is 9.55 ppm for the unsymmetrical isomer and 9.73 ppm for the symmetrical isomers, compared to 10.49 for diborane.

== Reactions ==
Methylborane shows little tendency to disproportionate (redistribute) at room temperature. It reacts stepwise with alkenes to produce mono and dialkylmethylboranes. More methylated boranes are less stable.

1,2-Dimethyldiborane slowly converts to 1,1-dimethyldiborane.

Methylborane hydrolyzes to methylboronic acid:

(MeBH_{2})_{2} + 4 H_{2}O → CH_{3}B(OH)_{2} + 4 H_{2}

Symmetrical dimethyldiborane reacts with trimethylamine to yield a solid adduct trimethylamine-methylborane (CH_{3})_{3}N·BH_{2}CH_{3}.

When dimethyldiborane is combined with ammonia and heated, B-methyl borazoles are produced. These borazoles can have one, two or three methyl groups substituted on the boron atoms.

Under normal conditions dimethyldiborane does not react with hydrogen.

== Related species ==
- Lithium trihydromethylborate [CH_{3}BH_{3}]^{−}.
- Isomers of diethyldiborane can be produced by analogous methods.
- 1,2- 2,2- and 2,4-dimethyltetraborane, 1,2-dimethylpentaborane 2,3-dimethylpentaborane, 4,5-dimethylhexaborane, and 5,6- 6,8- 6,9-dimethyldecaborane.

== Extra reading ==
- Carpenter, J. H.; Jones, W. J.; Jotham, R. W.; Long, L. H. (1968). "Laser-source Raman spectroscopy and the Raman spectra of the methyldiboranes". Chemical Communications (15): 881. doi:10.1039/C19680000881.
- Lehmann, Walter J.; Wilson, Charles O.; Shapiro, I. (1960). "Infrared Spectra of Alkyldiboranes. I. Monomethyldiboranes". The Journal of Chemical Physics. 32 (4): 1088. Bibcode:1960JChPh..32.1088L. doi:10.1063/1.1730853.
- Carpenter, J.H.; Jones, W.J.; Jotham, R.W.; Long, L.H. (June 1970). "The Raman spectra of the methyldiboranes—I 1, 1-dimethyldiborane and tetramethyldiborane". Spectrochimica Acta Part A: Molecular Spectroscopy. 26 (6): 1199–1214. Bibcode:1970AcSpA..26.1199C. doi:10.1016/0584-8539(70)80027-7.
- Jungfleisch, Francis M. (1973). Reactions of Methyl Substituted Diboranes and 2,2-Dimethyltetraborane with Amine Bases (Thesis). Ohio State University. Archived from the original on 4 March 2016.
- Isadore Shapiro; C. O. Wilson; J. F. Ditter; W. J. Lehmann (1961). Borax to Boranes (PDF). Advances in Chemistry Series. Vol. 32. American Chemical Society. pp. 134–136. doi:10.1021/ba-1961-0032.ch014. mass spectroscopy
- Levison, K. A.; Perkins, P. G. (1970). "Methylaluminium compounds I. The Electronic Structure of Some Methylaluminium and Methylboron Hydrides". Theoretica Chimica Acta. 17 (1): 1–14. doi:10.1007/BF00526759. S2CID 198179226. charge distribution and atom location calculations
