= Sodium triacetoxyborohydride =

- Sodium_triacetoxyborohydride

Names
- IUPAC name Sodium tris(acetato-kappaO)(hydrido)borate(1-)
- Other names: Borate(1-), tris(acetato-kappaO)hydro-, sodium (1:1), (T-4)-; STAB; STABH; Sodium triacetoxyhydroborate

Identifiers
CAS Number	56553-60-7
3D model (JSmol)	Interactive image
ChemSpider	2007055
ECHA InfoCard	100.115.747
EC Number	611-401-0
PubChem CID	23676153
UNII	4VU0JE4YSK
UN number	1409
CompTox Dashboard (EPA)	DTXSID8074368
- InChI: InChI=1S/C6H9BO6.Na/c1-4(8)11-7(12-5(2)9)13-6(3)10;/h1-3H3;/q-1;+1 Key: AGGHKNBCHLWKHY-UHFFFAOYSA-N
- SMILES: [BH-](OC(=O)C)(OC(=O)C)OC(=O)C.[Na+]

Properties
Chemical formula	Na[(CH_{3}COO)_{3}BH]
Molar mass	211.94 g·mol^{−1}
Appearance	White powder
Density	1.36 g/cm^{3} (20.1 °C (68.2 °F; 293.2 K))
Melting point	116–120 °C (241–248 °F; 389–393 K) decomposes
Solubility in water	decomposition
Solubility	1,2-dichloroethane, dichloromethane, dioxane, methylene chloride, tetrahydrofuran, toluene, benzene, dimethyl sulfoxide
log P	-2.88

Structure
Coordination geometry	4 at boron atom
Molecular shape	Tetrahedral at boron atom

Hazards
- GHS labelling
Pictograms	(GHS02: Flammable) (GHS05: Corrosive) (GHS07: Exclamation mark) (GHS08: Health hazard)
Signal word	Danger
Hazard statements	H228, H260, H302, H318, H360FD
Precautionary statements	P201, P202, P210, P223, P231+P232, P240, P241, P264, P270, P280, P301+P312+P330, P305+P351+P338+P310, P308+P313, P335+P334, P370+P378, P402+P404, P405, P501
NFPA 704 (fire diamond)	2 2 2 W
Autoignition temperature	360 °C (680 °F; 633 K)

Related compounds
Other anions	Sodium borohydride; Sodium cyanoborohydride
- Except where otherwise noted, data are given for materials in their standard state (at 25 °C [77 °F], 100 kPa). verify (what is ?) Infobox references

Sodium triacetoxyborohydride, also known as sodium triacetoxyhydroborate, commonly abbreviated STAB, is a chemical compound with the formula Na[(CH_{3}COO)_{3}BH]. Like other borohydrides, it is used as a reducing agent in organic synthesis. This colourless salt is prepared by protonolysis of sodium borohydride with acetic acid:

Na[BH_{4}] + 3 CH_{3}COOH → Na[(CH_{3}COO)_{3}BH] + 3 H_{2}

== Comparison with related reagents ==
Sodium triacetoxyborohydride is a milder reducing agent than sodium borohydride or even sodium cyanoborohydride. It reduces aldehydes but not most ketones. It is especially suitable for reductive aminations of aldehydes and ketones.

However, unlike sodium cyanoborohydride, sodium triacetoxyborohydride quickly decomposes upon contact with methanol. It reacts only slowly with ethanol and isopropanol and therefore can be used with these solvents.

Reductive amination with STAB

NaBH(OAc)_{3} may also be used for reductive alkylation of secondary amines with aldehyde-bisulfite adducts.

== Monoacetoxyborohydride ==
The combination of Na[BH_{4}] with carboxylic acids results in the formation of acyloxyborohydride species other than sodium triacetoxyborohydride. These modified species can perform a variety of reductions not normally associated with borohydride chemistry, such as alcohols to hydrocarbons and nitriles to primary amines.
