= Cobalt(II) acetate =

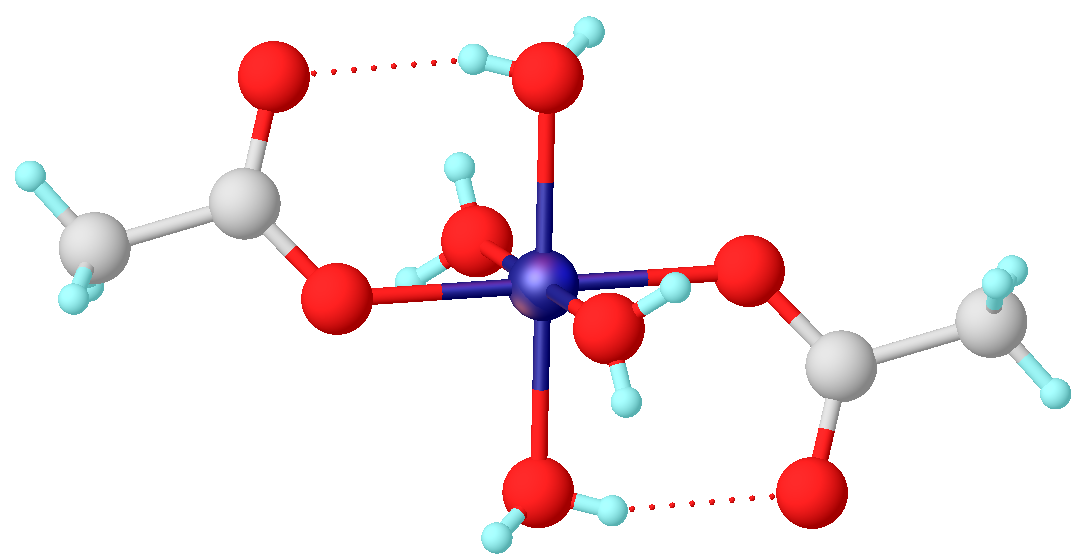

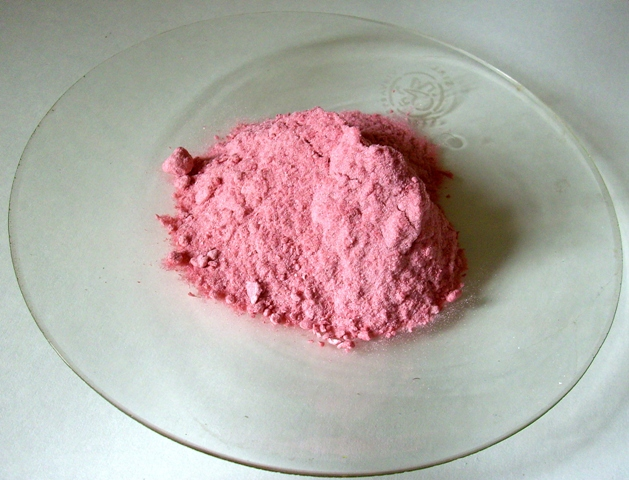

Names
- IUPAC name Cobalt(II) acetate

Identifiers
CAS Number	71-48-7 (anhydrous); 6147-53-1 (tetrahydrate)
3D model (JSmol)	ionic form: Interactive image; coordination form (anhydrate): Interactive image; coordination form (tetrahydrate): Interactive image
ChemSpider	6041
ECHA InfoCard	100.000.687
PubChem CID	6277
UNII	3XC4P44U7E; 7648Z91O1N (tetrahydrate)
CompTox Dashboard (EPA)	DTXSID6026373
- InChI: InChI=1S/2C2H4O2.Co/c2*1-2(3)4;/h2*1H3,(H,3,4);/q;;+2/p-2 Key: QAHREYKOYSIQPH-UHFFFAOYSA-L; InChI=1/2C2H4O2.Co/c2*1-2(3)4;/h2*1H3,(H,3,4);/q;;+2/p-2 Key: QAHREYKOYSIQPH-NUQVWONBAX
- SMILES: ionic form: [Co+2].[O-]C(=O)C.[O-]C(=O)C; coordination form (anhydrate): O=C(C)O[Co]OC(C)=O; coordination form (tetrahydrate): O=C(C)O[Co-4]([O+H2])([O+H2])([O+H2])([O+H2])OC(C)=O

Properties
Chemical formula	Co(C_{2}H_{3}O_{2})_{2}
Molar mass	177.021 g/mol (anhydrous); 249.081 g/mol (tetrahydrate)
Appearance	Pink crystals (anhydrous) intense red crystals (tetrahydrate)
Odor	vinegar (tetrahydrate)
Density	1.705 g/cm^{3} (tetrahydrate)
Melting point	140 °C (284 °F; 413 K) (tetrahydrate)
Solubility in water	Soluble
Solubility	soluble in alcohol, dilute acids, pentyl acetate (tetrahydrate)
Magnetic susceptibility (χ)	+11,000·10^{−6} cm^{3}/mol
Refractive index (n_{D})	1.542 (tetrahydrate)

Hazards
- GHS labelling
Pictograms	(GHS08: Health hazard) (GHS09: Environmental hazard)
Signal word	Danger
Hazard statements	H317, H334, H341, H350i, H360F, H410
Precautionary statements	P203, P233, P260, P271, P272, P273, P280, P284, P302+P352, P304+P340, P318, P321, P333+P317, P342+P316, P362+P364, P391, P403, P405, P501
NFPA 704 (fire diamond)	1 0 0
- Lethal dose or concentration (LD, LC)
LD_{50} (median dose)	503 mg/kg (oral, rat)
Safety data sheet (SDS)	J.T. Baker MSDS
- Except where otherwise noted, data are given for materials in their standard state (at 25 °C [77 °F], 100 kPa). verify (what is ?) Infobox references

Cobalt(II) acetate is the cobalt salt of acetic acid. It is commonly found as the tetrahydrate Co(CH_{3}CO_{2})_{2}·4 H_{2}O, abbreviated Co(OAc)_{2}·4 H_{2}O. It is used as a catalyst.

== Synthesis and structure ==
Like many other transition metal acetates, cobalt(II) acetate forms by the reaction of cobalt oxide or hydroxide and acetic acid:

CoO + 2 CH_{3}CO_{2}H + 3 H_{2}O → Co(CH_{3}CO_{2})_{2}·4H_{2}O

The tetrahydrate has been shown by X-ray crystallography to adopt an octahedral structure, the central cobalt centre being coordinated by four water molecules and two acetate ligands. The analogous nickel acetate is isostructural.

Various hydrates are known including Co(CH_{3}CO_{2})_{2}·H_{2}O and [Co(CH_{3}CO_{2})_{2}]_{5}·0.5 H_{2}O. These are coordination polymers:

Segment of the Co(OAc)_{2}(H_{2}O) chain

== Reactions and uses ==
Cobalt acetate is a precursor to various oil drying agents, catalysts that allow paints and varnishes to harden.

Anhydrous cobalt acetate is a widely used source of cobalt in the synthesis of materials, catalyst, and complexes.

Oxidation of acetic acid solutions of cobalt(II) acetate, e.g. with ozone, gives cobalt(III) acetates, which are strong oxidants.
