= Dinickel boride =

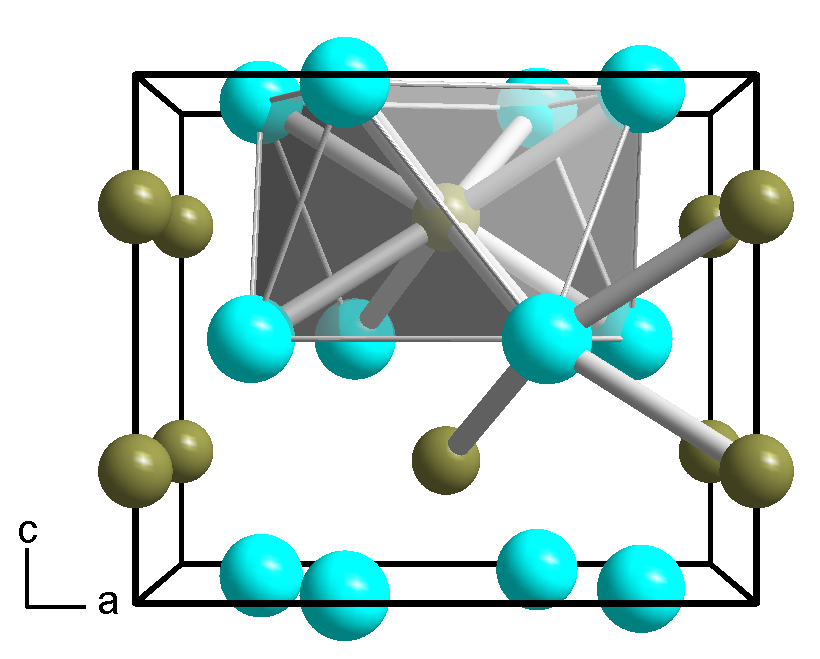

Identifiers
CAS Number	12007-01-1
3D model (JSmol)	Interactive image
ChemSpider	21170791
ECHA InfoCard	100.031.345
EC Number	234-494-6
PubChem CID	6336854
CompTox Dashboard (EPA)	DTXSID401010200
- InChI: InChI=1S/B.2Ni Key: WRLJWIVBUPYRTE-UHFFFAOYSA-N
- SMILES: [B].[Ni].[Ni]

Properties
Chemical formula	Ni_{2}B
Molar mass	128.2 g/mol

Hazards
- GHS labelling
Pictograms	(GHS07: Exclamation mark) (GHS08: Health hazard) (GHS09: Environmental hazard)
Signal word	Danger
Hazard statements	H317, H350i, H372, H410
- Except where otherwise noted, data are given for materials in their standard state (at 25 °C [77 °F], 100 kPa). Infobox references

Dinickel boride is a chemical compound of nickel and boron with formula Ni_{2}B. It is one of the borides of nickel.

The formula "Ni_{2}B" and the name "nickel boride" are often used for a nickel-boron catalyst obtained by reacting nickel salts with sodium borohydride. However, that product is not a well-defined compound, and its bulk formula is closer to Ni_{2.5}B.

== Synthesis ==
Dinickel boride can be obtained (together with other nickel borides) by heating sodium borohydride with powdered nickel metal up to 670 °C in a closed vessel, so that the released hydrogen creates a pressure of up to 3.4 MPa. The main reactions can be summarized as

2NaBH_{4} ↔ 2NaH + B_{2}H_{6}
2Ni + 2B_{2}H_{6} + NaH ↔ Ni_{2}B + 3BH_{3} + 2H_{2} + Na

but other reactions occur, yielding other borides.

== See also ==
- Trinickel boride
