= Trinickel boride =

Identifiers
CAS Number	12007-02-2
3D model (JSmol)	Interactive image
ChemSpider	4891848
ECHA InfoCard	100.031.346
EC Number	234-495-1
PubChem CID	6336855
CompTox Dashboard (EPA)	DTXSID501010203
- InChI: InChI=1S/B.3Ni Key: QHFBXOYEDDRLIZ-UHFFFAOYSA-N
- SMILES: [B].[Ni].[Ni].[Ni]

Properties
Chemical formula	Ni_{3}B
Molar mass	186.89 g/mol

Hazards
- GHS labelling
Pictograms	(GHS07: Exclamation mark) (GHS08: Health hazard) (GHS09: Environmental hazard)
Signal word	Danger
Hazard statements	H317, H350i, H372, H410
- Except where otherwise noted, data are given for materials in their standard state (at 25 °C [77 °F], 100 kPa). Infobox references

Trinickel boride is a compound of nickel and boron with chemical formula Ni_{3}B. It is one of the borides of nickel.

The compound was described in 1959 by R. Fruchart, S. Rundqvist, and L. H. Anderson and R. Kiessling. It is a hard solid with the cementite crystal structure.

== Synthesis ==
Trinickel boride can be obtained, as grains embedded in a nickel matrix, by heating Brown's P-1 and P-2 "nickel boride"catalyst to 250 °C. This catalyst is produced by reduction of nickel salts with sodium borohydride.

Trinickel boride can be obtained also by compressing nickel and boron powders with explosives.

Recently it has been found that Ni_{3}B can be formed (together with other nickel borides) by heating sodium borohydride with powdered nickel metal to 670 °C in a closed vessel, so that the released hydrogen creates a pressure of up to 3.4 MPa. The main reactions can be summarized as

2NaBH_{4} ↔ 2NaH + B_{2}H_{6}
3Ni + 2B_{2}H_{6} + NaH ↔ Ni_{3}B + 3BH_{3} + 2H_{2} + Na

but other reactions occur, yielding other borides.

== See also ==
- Dinickel boride
