= Nickel boride (disambiguation) =

Nickel boride is the common name of material composed chiefly of the elements nickel and boron that are widely used as catalysts in organic chemistry.

Nickel boride may also refer to:

- Dinickel boride (Ni_{2}B)
- Trinickel boride (Ni_{3}B)
