= Herbert C. Brown =

American chemist (1912–2004)

- Born: Herbert Brovarnik; 22 May 1912; London, England, UK
- Died: 19 December 2004 (aged 92); Lafayette, Indiana, US
- Education: University of Chicago
- Known for: Organoboranes
- Spouse(s): Sarah Baylen (1937–2005; his death; 1 child)
- Awards: Centenary Prize (1955); William H. Nichols Medal (1959); National Medal of Science (1969); Elliott Cresson Medal (1978); Nobel Prize for Chemistry (1979); Priestley Medal (1981); Perkin Medal (1982); AIC Gold Medal (1985); NAS Award in Chemical Sciences (1987)
- Scientific career
- Fields: Chemistry
- Workplaces: University of Chicago, Purdue University
- Doctoral advisor: Hermann Irving Schlesinger

Herbert Charles Brown (22 May 1912 – 19 December 2004) was an American chemist and recipient of the 1979 Nobel Prize in Chemistry for his work with organoboranes.

== Life and career ==
Brown was born Herbert Brovarnik in London, to Ukrainian Jewish immigrants from Zhitomir, Pearl (née Gorinstein) and Charles Brovarnik, a hardware store manager and carpenter. His family moved to Chicago in June 1914, when he was two years old. Brown attended Crane Junior College in Chicago, where he met Sarah Baylen, whom he would later marry. The college was under threat of closing, and Brown and Baylen transferred to Wright Junior College. In 1935 he left Wright and that autumn entered the University of Chicago, completing two years of studies in three quarters to earn a B.S. in 1936. That same year, he became a naturalized United States citizen, and began graduate studies at Chicago. On February 6, 1937, Brown married Baylen, whom he would later credit with sparking an interest in hydrides of boron that would eventually lead to the work for which he, together with Georg Wittig, would be awarded the Nobel prize in Chemistry in 1979, and the following year received his degree as Ph.D.

Unable to find a position in industry, he decided to accept a postdoctoral position, beginning his academic career. He became an instructor at Chicago in 1939, and held the position for four years before moving to Wayne University in Detroit as an assistant professor. In 1946, he was promoted to associate professor, and the following year became a professor of inorganic chemistry at Purdue University in 1947 and joined the Beta Nu chapter of Alpha Chi Sigma there in 1960. He held the position of Professor Emeritus from 1978 until his death in 2004. The Herbert C. Brown Laboratory of Chemistry was named after him on Purdue University's campus. He was an honorary member of the International Academy of Science, Munich.

During World War II, while working with Hermann Irving Schlesinger, Brown discovered a method for producing sodium borohydride (NaBH_{4}), which can be used to produce boranes, compounds of boron and hydrogen. His work led to the discovery of the first general method for producing asymmetric pure enantiomers. The elements found as initials of his name H, C and B were his working field.

In 1969, he was awarded the National Medal of Science.

Brown was quick to credit his wife Sarah with supporting him and allowing him to focus on creative efforts by handling finances, maintaining the house and yard, etc. According to Brown, after receiving the Nobel prize in Stockholm, he carried the medal and she carried the US$100,000 award.

In 1971, he received the Golden Plate Award of the American Academy of Achievement.

He was inducted into the Alpha Chi Sigma Hall of Fame in 2000.

He died 19 December 2004, at a hospital in Lafayette, Indiana after a heart attack. His wife died 29 May 2005, aged 89.

== Research ==
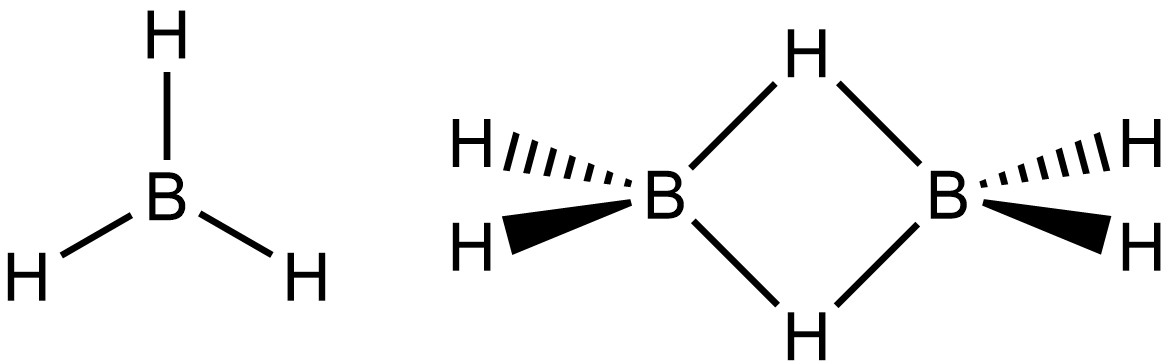
Borane, BH_{3}, is a gaseous compound that is only present at high temperatures. It dimerises to form diborane, B_{2}H_{6}. Diborane has a pair of three-center two-electron bonds.

As a doctoral student at the University of Chicago, Herbert Brown studied the reactions of diborane, B_{2}H_{6}. Hermann Irving Schlesinger's laboratory at the University of Chicago was one of two laboratories that prepared diborane. It was a rare compound that was only prepared in small quantities. Schlesinger was researching the reactions of diborane to understand why the simplest hydrogen-boron compound is B_{2}H_{6} instead of BH_{3}.

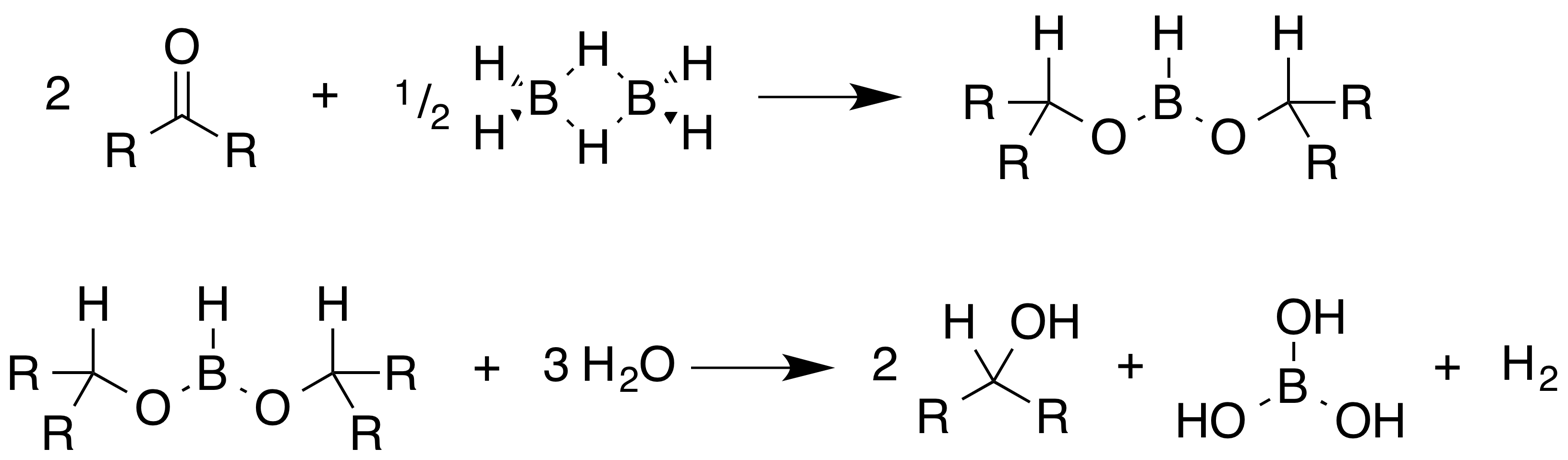
A general reaction between diborane and a ketone

When Brown started his own research, he observed the reactions of diborane with aldehydes, ketones, esters, and acid chlorides. He discovered that diborane reacts with aldehydes and ketones to produce dialkoxyboranes, which are hydrolyzed by water to produce alcohols. Until this point, organic chemists did not have an acceptable method of reducing carbonyls under mild conditions. Yet Brown's Ph.D. thesis published in 1939 received little interest. Diborane was too rare to be useful as a synthetic reagent.

In 1939, Brown became the research assistant in Schlesinger's laboratory. In 1940, they began to research volatile, low molecular weight uranium compounds for the National Defense Research Committee. Brown and Schlesinger successfully synthesized volatile uranium(IV) borohydride, which had a molecular weight of 298. The laboratory was asked to provide a large amount of the product for testing, but diborane was in short supply. They discovered that it could be formed by reacting lithium hydride with boron trifluoride in ethyl ether, allowing them to produce the chemical in larger quantities. This success was met with several new problems. Lithium hydride was also in short supply, so Brown and Schlesinger needed to find a procedure that would allow them to use sodium hydride instead. They discovered that sodium hydride and methyl borate reacted to produce sodium trimethoxyborohydride, which was viable as a substitute for the lithium hydride.

Soon they were informed that there was no longer a need for uranium borohydride, but it appeared that sodium borohydride could be useful in generating hydrogen. They began to look for a cheaper synthesis and discovered that adding methyl borate to sodium hydride at 250° produced sodium borohydride and sodium methoxide. When acetone was used in an attempt to separate the two products, it was discovered that sodium borohydride reduced the acetone.

Sodium borohydride is a mild reducing agent that works well in reducing aldehydes, ketones, and acid chlorides. Lithium aluminum hydride is a much more powerful reducing agent that can reduce almost any functional group. When Brown moved to Purdue University in 1947, he worked to find stronger borohydrides and milder aluminum hydrides that would provide a spectrum of reducing agents. The team of researchers at Purdue discovered that changing the metal ion of the borohydride to lithium, magnesium, or aluminum increases the reducing ability. They also found that introducing alkoxy substituents to the aluminum hydride decreases the reducing ability. They successfully developed a full spectrum of reducing agents.

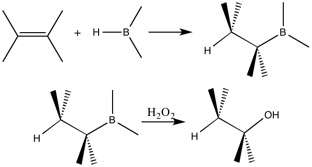
In hydroboration-oxidation, the OH group adds to the less-substituted carbon in the double bond.

While researching these reducing agents, Brown's coworker, Dr. B. C. Subba Rao, discovered an unusual reaction between sodium borohydride and ethyl oleate. The borohydride added hydrogen and boron to the carbon-carbon double bond in the ethyl oleate. The organoborane product could then be oxidized to form an alcohol. This two-step reaction is now called hydroboration-oxidation and is a reaction that converts alkenes into anti-Markovnikov alcohols. Markovnikov's rule states that, in adding hydrogen and a halide or hydroxyl group to a carbon-carbon double bond, the hydrogen is added to the less-substituted carbon of the bond and the hydroxyl or halide group is added to the more-substituted carbon of the bond. In hydroboration-oxidation, the opposite addition occurs.

== See also ==
- List of Jewish Nobel laureates
