= Sodium cyanoborohydride =

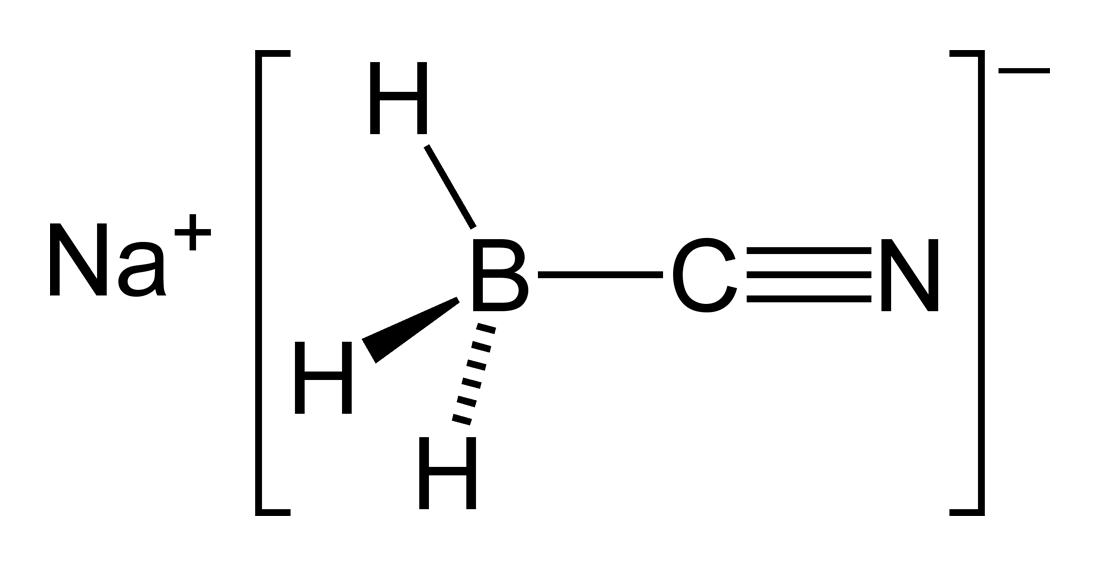
- Line-bond structure of sodium cyanoborohydride

Names
- IUPAC name Sodium cyanoboranuide
- Other names Sodium cyanotrihydridoborate

Identifiers
CAS Number	25895-60-7
3D model (JSmol)	Interactive image
ChemSpider	2006099
ECHA InfoCard	100.043.001
EC Number	247-317-2
PubChem CID	5003444
UNII	C4I8C58P9T
CompTox Dashboard (EPA)	DTXSID40894864
- InChI: Key: CVDUGUOQTVTBJH-UHFFFAOYSA-N; InChI=1S/CH3BN.Na/c2-1-3;/h2H3;/q-1;+1
- SMILES: [BH3-]C#N.[Na+]

Properties
Chemical formula	Na[BH_{3}(CN)]
Molar mass	62.84 g·mol^{−1}
Appearance	white powder, hygroscopic
Density	1.083 g/cm (25°C)^{3}
Melting point	242 °C (468 °F; 515 K) decomposes
Solubility in water	212 g/(100 mL) (29 °C)
Solubility	soluble in water, ethanol, diglyme, tetrahydrofuran, methanol slightly soluble in methanol insoluble in diethyl ether

Structure
Coordination geometry	4 at boron atom
Molecular shape	Tetrahedral at boron atom

Hazards
- Occupational safety and health (OHS/OSH)
Main hazards	Flammable solid, fatal if swallowed, in contact with skin or if inhaled Contact with acids liberates very toxic gas Contact with water liberates highly flammable gas
- GHS labelling
Pictograms	(GHS02: Flammable) (GHS05: Corrosive) (GHS06: Toxic)
Signal word	Danger
Hazard statements	H228, H300, H310, H314, H330, H410
Precautionary statements	P210, P260, P264, P273, P280, P284
NFPA 704 (fire diamond)	4 3 2
Threshold limit value (TLV)	5 mg/m3 (TWA)
Safety data sheet (SDS)	Sigma Aldrich

Related compounds
Other anions	Sodium borohydride
Related compounds	Lithium aluminium hydride
- Except where otherwise noted, data are given for materials in their standard state (at 25 °C [77 °F], 100 kPa). verify (what is ?) Infobox references

Sodium cyanoborohydride is a chemical compound with the formula Na[BH_{3}(CN)]. It is a colourless salt used in organic synthesis for chemical reduction including that of imines and carbonyls. Sodium cyanoborohydride is a milder reductant than other conventional reducing agents.

== Structure ==
Sodium cyanoborohydride is a salt. The cationic sodium ion, [Na]^{+}, interacts with the anionic cyanoborohydride ion, [BH3(CN)]^{−}. The anionic component of the salt is tetrahedral at the boron atom.

The electron-withdrawing cyanide substituent draws electron density away from the negatively charged boron; thus, reducing the electrophilic capabilities of the anionic component. This electronic phenomenon causes sodium cyanoborohydride to have more mild reducing qualities than other reducing agents. For example, Na[BH_{3}(CN)] is less reducing than its counterpart sodium borohydride, containing [BH_{4}]^{−}.

== Uses ==
Sodium cyanoborohydride is a mild reducing agent. It is generally used for the reduction of imines. These reactions occur <pH 7 because the iminium ions are the actual substrates.

Reductive amination, sometimes called the Borch reaction, is the conversion of a carbonyl into an amine through an intermediate imine. The carbonyl is first treated with ammonia to promote imine formation by nucleophilic attack. The imine is then reduced to an amine by sodium cyanoborohydride. This reaction works on both aldehydes and ketones. The carbonyl can be treated with ammonia, a primary amine, or a secondary amine to produce, respectively, 1°, 2°, and 3° amines.

Aromatic ketones and aldehydes can be reductively deoxygenated using sodium cyanoborohydride. This means that the carbonyl oxygen is being removed completely from the molecule. Deoxygenation using sodium cyanoborohydride is often done in the presence of trimethylsilyl chloride, or TMSCl.

== Preparation ==
Sodium cyanoborohydride can be purchased from most chemical suppliers. It can be synthesized by combining sodium cyanide and borane tetrahydrofuran.

BH_{3}·THF + NaCN → NaBH_{3}CN + THF

== Selectivity ==
Since sodium cyanoborohydride is a mild reducing agent, it gives good chemoselectivity for reaction with certain functional groups in the presence of others. For example, sodium cyanoborohydride is generally incapable of reducing amides, ethers, esters and lactones, nitriles, or epoxides. Therefore, it can selectively reduce some functionalities in the presence of others.

Some examples of selective reduction include:

- Reduction of iminium ions in the presence of carbonyls
- Reduction of aldehydes in the presence of ketones and esters.
- Reduction of aldehydes in the presence of thioesters

The selectivity of this reducing agent makes it an important tool in organic synthesis. It allows for specific modifications to be made to complex organic molecules.

== History ==
Georg Wittig was the first to synthesize a cyanoborohydride by treating lithium borohydride with hydrogen cyanide in 1951. The corresponding compound, sodium cyanoborohydride, was synthesized following a similar rationale by reacting sodium borohydride with hydrogen cyanide. The synthesis was later refined to use sodium cyanide and borane in THF making the process safer.

== See also ==
- Sodium triacetoxyborohydride – a milder reductant, but unstable in water
- Sodium borohydride – a stronger, cheaper reductant
