= Nickel(II) acetate =

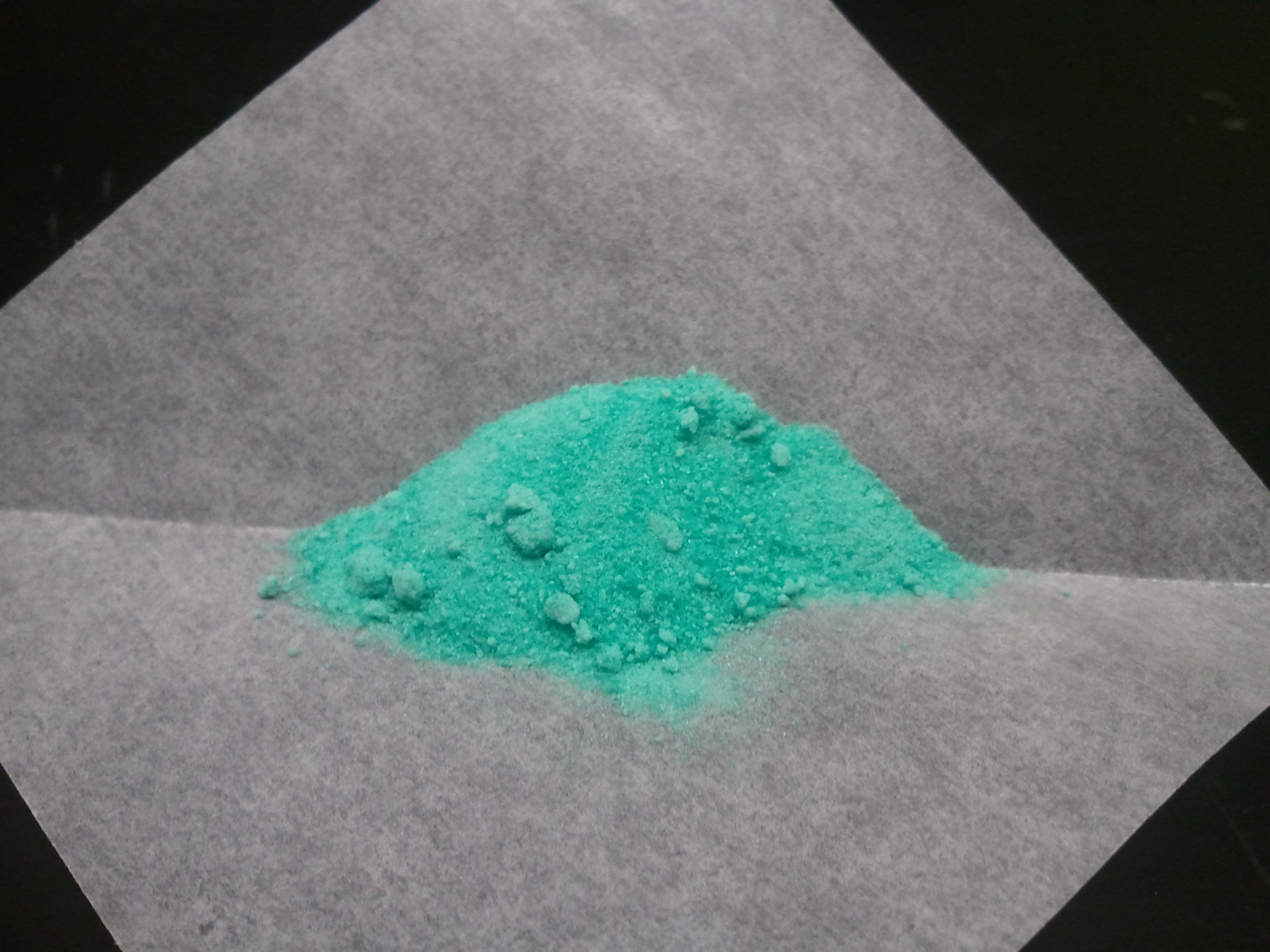

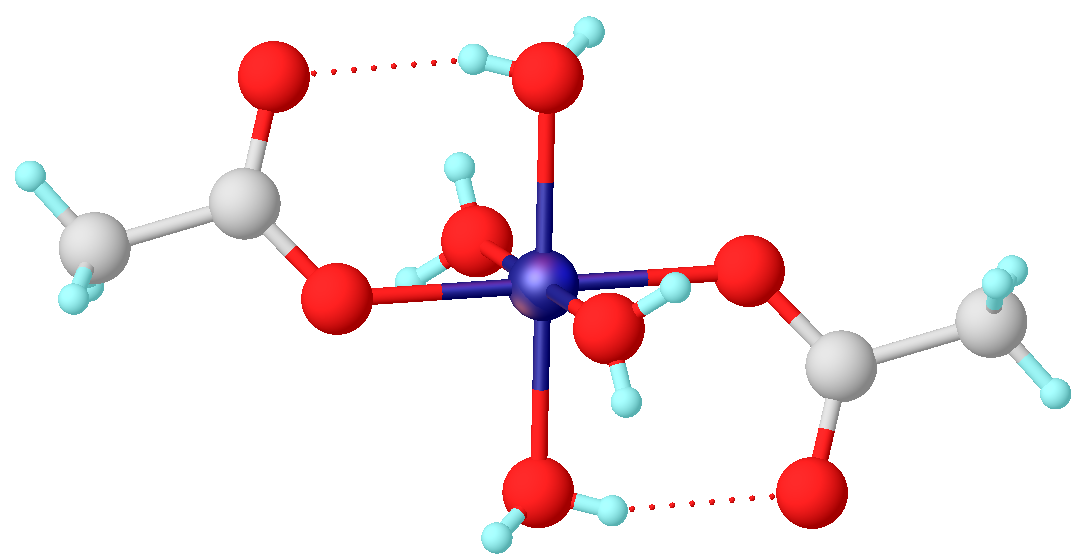

Names
- Systematic IUPAC name Nickel(2+) diacetate

Identifiers
CAS Number	373-02-4; (tetrahydrate): 6018-89-9
3D model (JSmol)	ionic form: Interactive image; (tetrahydrate): Interactive image; coordination form (anhydrate): Interactive image
ChemSpider	9373; (tetrahydrate): 56360
ECHA InfoCard	100.006.147
EC Number	239-086-1
PubChem CID	9756; (tetrahydrate): 62601
UNII	99QP4ELX96; (tetrahydrate): 6SOA8L0560
UN number	2811
CompTox Dashboard (EPA)	DTXSID7020926; (tetrahydrate): DTXSID9075458
- InChI: Key: AIYYMMQIMJOTBM-UHFFFAOYSA-L; InChI=1S/2C2H4O2.Ni/c2*1-2(3)4;/h2*1H3,(H,3,4);/q;;+2/p-2; (tetrahydrate): InChI=1S/2C2H4O2.Ni.4H2O/c2*1-2(3)4;;;;;/h2*1H3,(H,3,4);;4*1H2/q;;+2;;;;/p-2 Key: OINIXPNQKAZCRL-UHFFFAOYSA-L
- SMILES: ionic form: [Ni+2].[O-]C(=O)C.[O-]C(=O)C; (tetrahydrate): CC(=O)[O-].CC(=O)[O-].O.O.O.O.[Ni+2]; coordination form (anhydrate): O=C(C)O[Ni]OC(C)=O

Properties
Chemical formula	C_{4}H_{6}NiO_{4}
Molar mass	176.781 g·mol^{−1}
Appearance	Mint-green Solid
Odor	slight acetic acid
Density	1.798 g/cm^{3} (anhydrous); 1.744 g/cm^{3} (tetrahydrate)
Melting point	decomposes when heated
Solubility in water	Easily soluble in cold water, hot water
Solubility	Soluble in methanol insoluble in diethyl ether, n-octanol
Magnetic susceptibility (χ)	+4,690.0·10^{−6} cm^{3}/mol

Structure
Crystal structure	monoclinic
Space group	P2_{1}/c
Lattice constant	a = 4.764, b = 11.771, c = 8.425 Å α = 90°, β = 93.6°, γ = 90° tetrahydrate
Lattice volume (V)	471.5
Formula units (Z)	2
Coordination geometry	distorted octahedral

Hazards
- GHS labelling
Pictograms	(GHS07: Exclamation mark) (GHS08: Health hazard) (GHS09: Environmental hazard)
Signal word	Danger
Hazard statements	H302, H317, H332, H334, H341, H350, H360, H372, H410
Precautionary statements	P203, P233, P260, P264, P270, P271, P272, P273, P280, P284, P301+P317, P302+P352, P304+P340, P317, P318, P319, P321, P330, P333+P317, P342+P316, P362+P364, P391, P403, P405, P501
NFPA 704 (fire diamond)	2 0 0
- Lethal dose or concentration (LD, LC)
LD_{50} (median dose)	350 mg/kg (rat, oral); 410 mg/kg (mouse, oral)
- Except where otherwise noted, data are given for materials in their standard state (at 25 °C [77 °F], 100 kPa). verify (what is ?) Infobox references

Nickel(II) acetate is the name for the coordination compounds with the formula Ni(CH_{3}CO_{2})_{2}·x H_{2}O where x can be 0, 2, and 4. The mint-green tetrahydrate Ni(CH_{3}CO_{2})_{2}·4 H_{2}O is most common. It is used for electroplating.

== Synthesis and structure ==
The compound can be prepared by treating nickel or nickel(II) carbonate with acetic acid:

NiCO_{3} + 2 CH_{3}CO_{2}H + 3 H_{2}O → Ni(CH_{3}CO_{2})_{2}·4 H_{2}O + CO_{2}

The mint-green tetrahydrate has been shown by X-ray crystallography to adopt an octahedral structure, the central nickel centre being coordinated by four water molecules and two acetate ligands. It may be dehydrated in vacuo, by reaction with acetic anhydride or by heat.

== Safety ==
Nickel salts are toxic, carcinogenic and irritate the skin.
