= Trimethylborane =

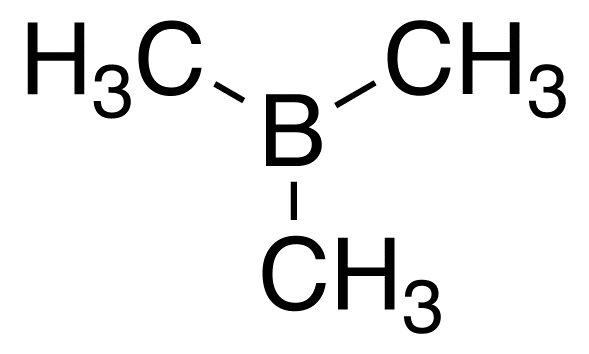

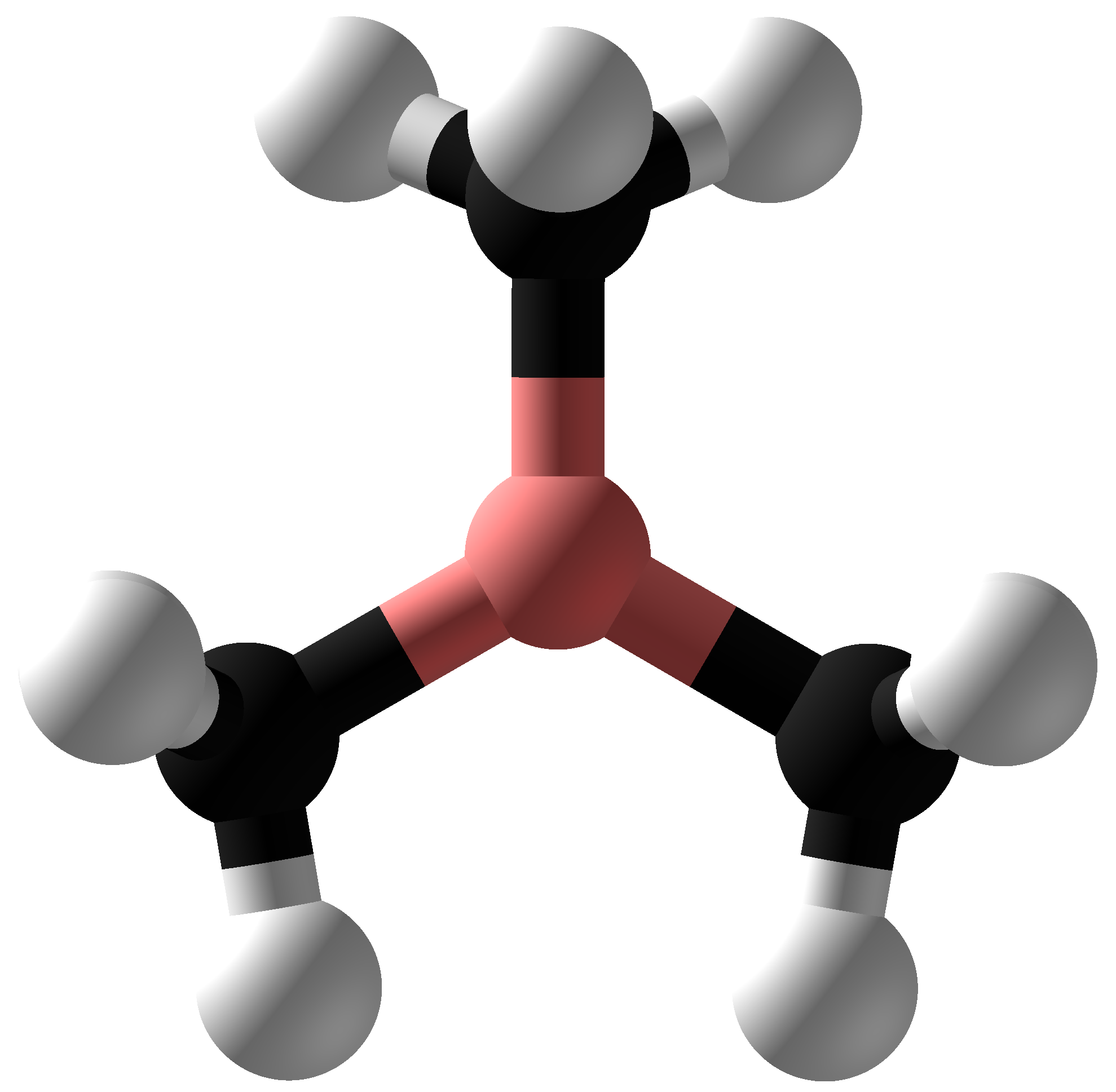

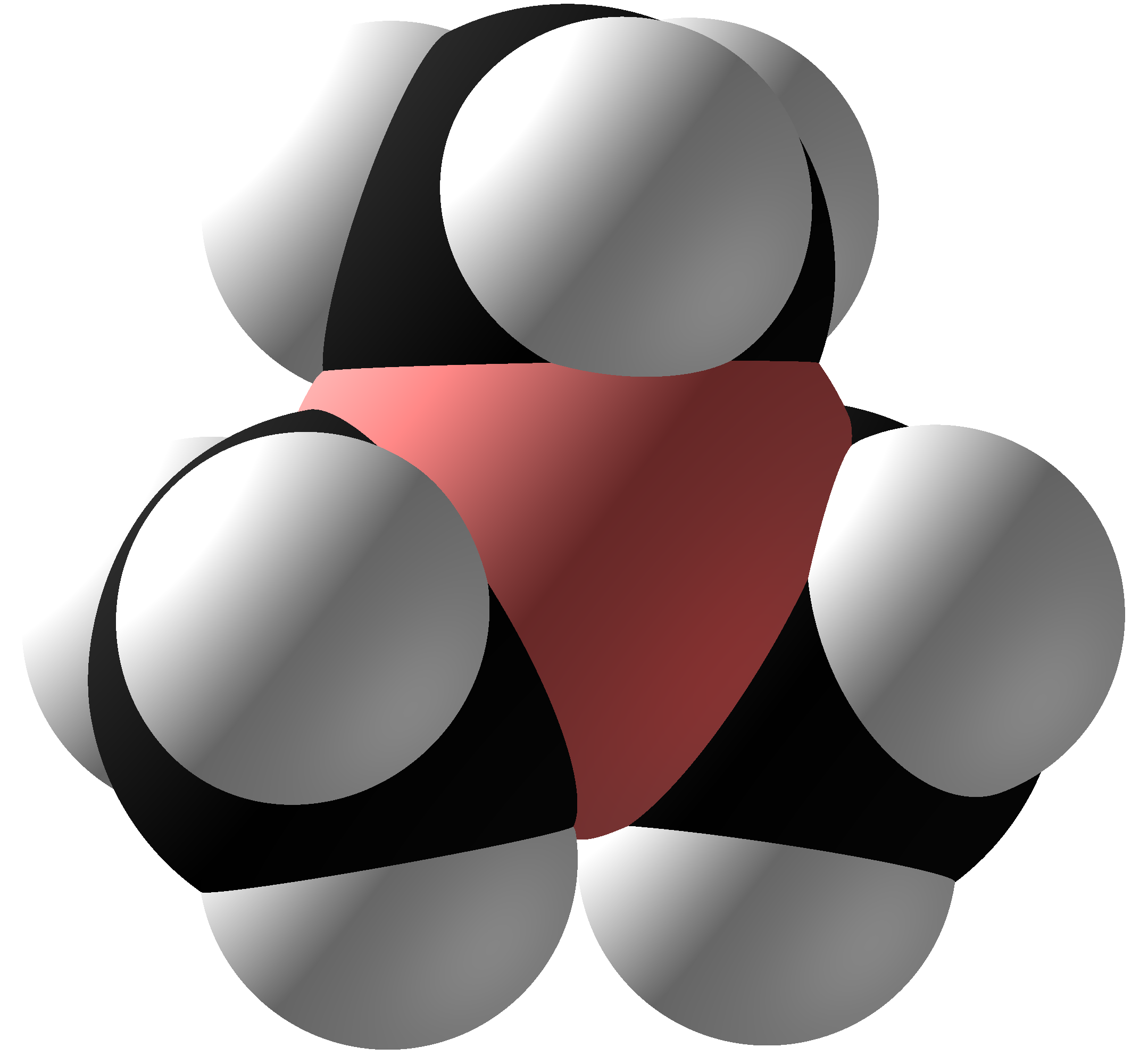

Names
- Preferred IUPAC name Trimethylborane
- Other names Trimethylborine; Trimethylboron

Identifiers
CAS Number	593-90-8
3D model (JSmol)	Interactive image
ChemSpider	62201
ECHA InfoCard	100.008.926
EC Number	209-816-3
PubChem CID	68979
CompTox Dashboard (EPA)	DTXSID90208038
- InChI: InChI=1S/C3H9B/c1-4(2)3/h1-3H3 Key: WXRGABKACDFXMG-UHFFFAOYSA-N
- SMILES: CB(C)C

Properties
Chemical formula	C_{3}H_{9}B
Molar mass	55.92 g/mol
Appearance	Colorless gas or liquid
Density	0.625 g/cm^{3} at −100 °C
Melting point	−161.5 °C (−258.7 °F; 111.6 K)
Boiling point	−20.2 °C (−4.4 °F; 253.0 K)
Solubility in water	Slight, highly reactive

Structure
Molecular shape	Δ

Hazards
- Occupational safety and health (OHS/OSH)
Main hazards	Spontaneously flammable in air; causes burns
- GHS labelling
Pictograms	(GHS02: Flammable) (GHS05: Corrosive)
Signal word	Danger
Hazard statements	H220, H250, H280, H314
Precautionary statements	P210, P222, P260, P264, P301+P330+P331, P302+P334, P303+P361+P353, P304+P340, P305+P351+P338, P310, P321, P363, P370+P378, P377, P381, P403, P405, P410+P403, P422, P501
NFPA 704 (fire diamond)	4 4 4 W
Flash point	Not applicable, pyrophoric gas
Autoignition temperature	−40 °C (−40 °F; 233 K)
Safety data sheet (SDS)	MSDS from Voltaix

Related compounds
Related compounds	Triethylborane; Triphenylborane; Diborane; Methylborane; Trimethylaluminium; Trimethylgallium; Trimethylindium
- Except where otherwise noted, data are given for materials in their standard state (at 25 °C [77 °F], 100 kPa). verify (what is ?) Infobox references

Trimethylborane (TMB) is a toxic, pyrophoric gas with the formula B(CH_{3})_{3} (which can also be written as Me_{3}B, with Me representing methyl).

== Properties ==
As a liquid it is colourless. The strongest line in the infrared spectrum is at 1330 cm^{−1} followed by lines at 3010 cm^{−1} and 1185 cm^{−1}.

Its melting point is −161.5 °C, and its boiling point is −20.2 °C.

Vapour pressure is given by log P = 6.1385 + 1.75 log T − 1393.3/T − 0.007735 T, where T is temperature in kelvins. Molecular weight is 55.914. The heat of vapourisation is 25.6 kJ/mol.

== Preparation ==
Trimethylborane was first described in 1862 by Edward Frankland, who also mentioned its adduct with ammonia. Due to its dangerous nature the compound was no longer studied until 1921, when Alfred Stock and Friedrich Zeidler took advantage of the reaction between boron trichloride gas and dimethylzinc. Although the substance can be prepared using Grignard reagents the output is contaminated by unwanted products from the solvent. Trimethylborane can be made on a small scale with a 98% yield by reacting trimethylaluminium in hexane with boron tribromide in dibutyl ether as a solvent. Yet other methods are reacting tributyl borate with trimethylaluminium chloride, or potassium tetrafluoroborate with trimethylaluminium, or adding boron trifluoride in ether to methyl magnesium iodide.

== Reactions ==
Trimethylborane spontaneously ignites in air if the concentration is high enough. It burns with a green flame producing soot. Slower oxidation with oxygen in a solvent or in the gas phase can produce dimethyltrioxadiboralane, which contains a ring of two boron and three oxygen atoms. However the major product is dimethylborylmethylperoxide, which rapidly decomposes to dimethoxymethylborane.

Trimethylborane is a strong Lewis acid. B(CH_{3})_{3} can form an adduct with ammonia: (NH_{3}):B(CH_{3})_{3}. as well as other Lewis bases. The Lewis acid properties of B(CH_{3})_{3} have been analyzed by the ECW model yielding E_{A}= 2.90 and C_{A}= 3.60. When trimethylborane forms an adduct with trimethylamine, steric repulsion between the methyl groups on the B and N results. The ECW model can provide a measure of this steric effect.

Trimethylborane reacts with water and chlorine at room temperature. It also reacts with grease but not with teflon or glass.

Trimethylborane reacts with diborane to disproportionate to form methyldiborane and dimethyldiborane: (CH_{3})BH_{2}.BH_{3} and (CH_{3})_{2}BH.BH_{3}.

It reacts as a gas with trimethylphosphine to form a solid Lewis salt with a heat of formation of −41 kcal per mol. This adduct has a heat of sublimation of −24.6 kcal/mol. No reaction occurs with trimethylarsine or trimethylstibine.

Methyl lithium reacting with the Trimethylborane produces a tetramethylborate salt: LiB(CH_{3})_{4}. The tetramethylborate ion has a negative charge and is isoelectronic with neopentane, tetramethylsilane, and the tetramethylammonium cation.

== Use ==
Trimethylborane has been used as a neutron counter. For this use it has to be very pure. It is also used in chemical vapour deposition where boron and carbon need to be deposited together.
