= Borohydride =

Any chemical compound having a borohydride anion

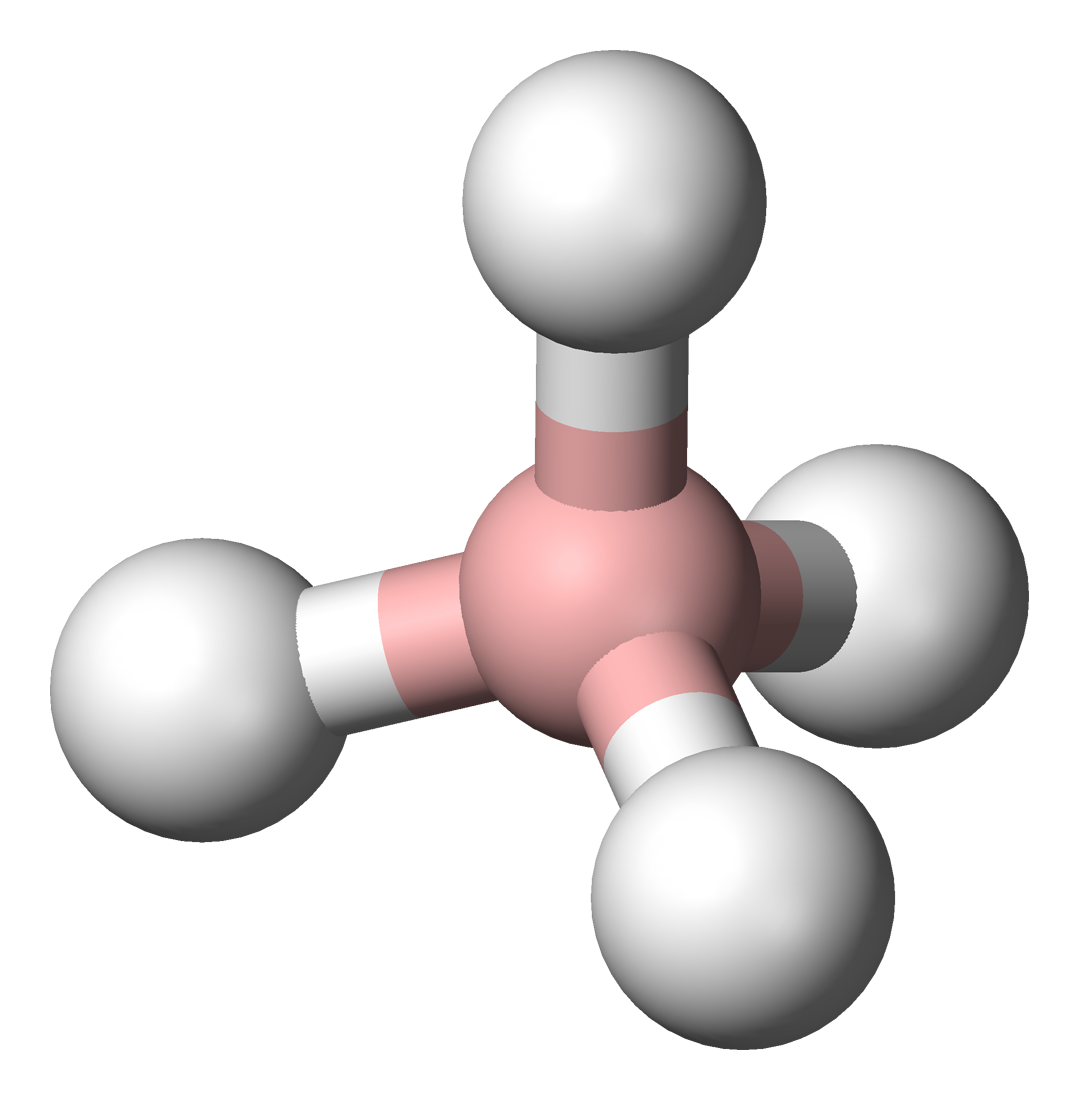
Ball-and-stick model of the tetrahydroborate anion, [BH_{4}]^{−}

Borohydride or tetrahydroborate refers to the anion [BH_{4}]^{−} and its salts. Borohydride or hydroborate is also the term used for compounds containing [BH_{4−n}X_{n}]^{−}, where n is an integer from 0 to 3, for example cyanoborohydride or cyanotrihydroborate [BH_{3}(CN)]^{−} and triethylborohydride or triethylhydroborate [BH(CH_{2}CH_{3})_{3}]^{−}. Borohydrides find wide use as reducing agents in organic synthesis. The most important borohydrides are lithium borohydride and sodium borohydride, but other salts are well known (see Table). Tetrahydroborates are also of academic and industrial interest in inorganic chemistry.

== History ==
Alkali metal borohydrides were first described in 1940 by Hermann Irving Schlesinger and Herbert C. Brown. They synthesized lithium borohydride Li[BH_{4}] from diborane B_{2}H_{6}:

2 MH + B_{2}H_{6} → 2 M[BH_{4}], where M = Li, Na, K, Rb, Cs, etc.

Current methods involve reduction of trimethyl borate with sodium hydride.

== Structure ==
In the borohydride anion and most of its modifications, boron has a tetrahedral structure. The reactivity of the B−H bonds depends on the other ligands. Electron-releasing ethyl groups as in triethylborohydride render the B−H center highly nucleophilic. In contrast, cyanoborohydride is a weaker reductant owing to the electron-withdrawing cyano substituent. The countercation also influences the reducing power of the reagent.

Selected properties of various borohydride salts
Borohydride [CAS no.]	molecular weight (g/mol)	Hydrogen density	Density (g/cm^{3})	melting point (°C)	Solubility in water (g/100 mL at 25 °C)	Solubility in MeOH (g/100 mL, 25 °C)	Solubility in Et_{2}O (g/100 mL, 25 °C)	Solubility in THF (g/100 mL at 25 °C)
Li[BH_{4}] [16949-15-8]	21.78	18.5	0.66	280	20.9	decomposes (44 in EtOH)	4.3	22.5
Na[BH_{4}] [16940-66-2]	37.83	10.6	1.07	505	55	16.4 (at 20 °C)	insoluble	0.1 (at 20 °C)
Na[BH_{3}(CN)] [25895-60-7]	62.84	6.4	1.20	240 with decomposition	tolerated	217	insoluble	36
K[BH_{4}] [13762-51-1]	53.94	7.4	1.17	585 (under H_{2})	19	insoluble	insoluble	insoluble
Li[BHEt_{3}] [22560-16-3]	105.94	0.95	unknown	unknown	decomposes	decomposes	N/A	high (supplied commercially)

== Uses ==
Sodium borohydride is the borohydride that is produced on the largest scale industrially, estimated at 5000 tons/year in 2002. The main use is for the reduction of sulfur dioxide to give sodium dithionite:

Na[BH_{4}] + 8 NaOH + 8 SO_{2} → 4 Na_{2}S_{2}O_{4} + NaBO_{2} + 6 H_{2}O

Dithionite is used to bleach wood pulp. Sodium borohydride is also used to reduce aldehydes and ketones in the production of pharmaceuticals including chloramphenicol, thiophenicol, vitamin A, atropine, and scopolamine, as well as many flavorings and aromas.

=== Potential applications ===
Because of their high hydrogen content, borohydride complexes and salts have been of interest in the context of hydrogen storage. Reminiscent of related work on ammonia borane, challenges are associated with slow kinetics and low yields of hydrogen as well as problems with regeneration of the parent borohydrides.

== Coordination complexes ==
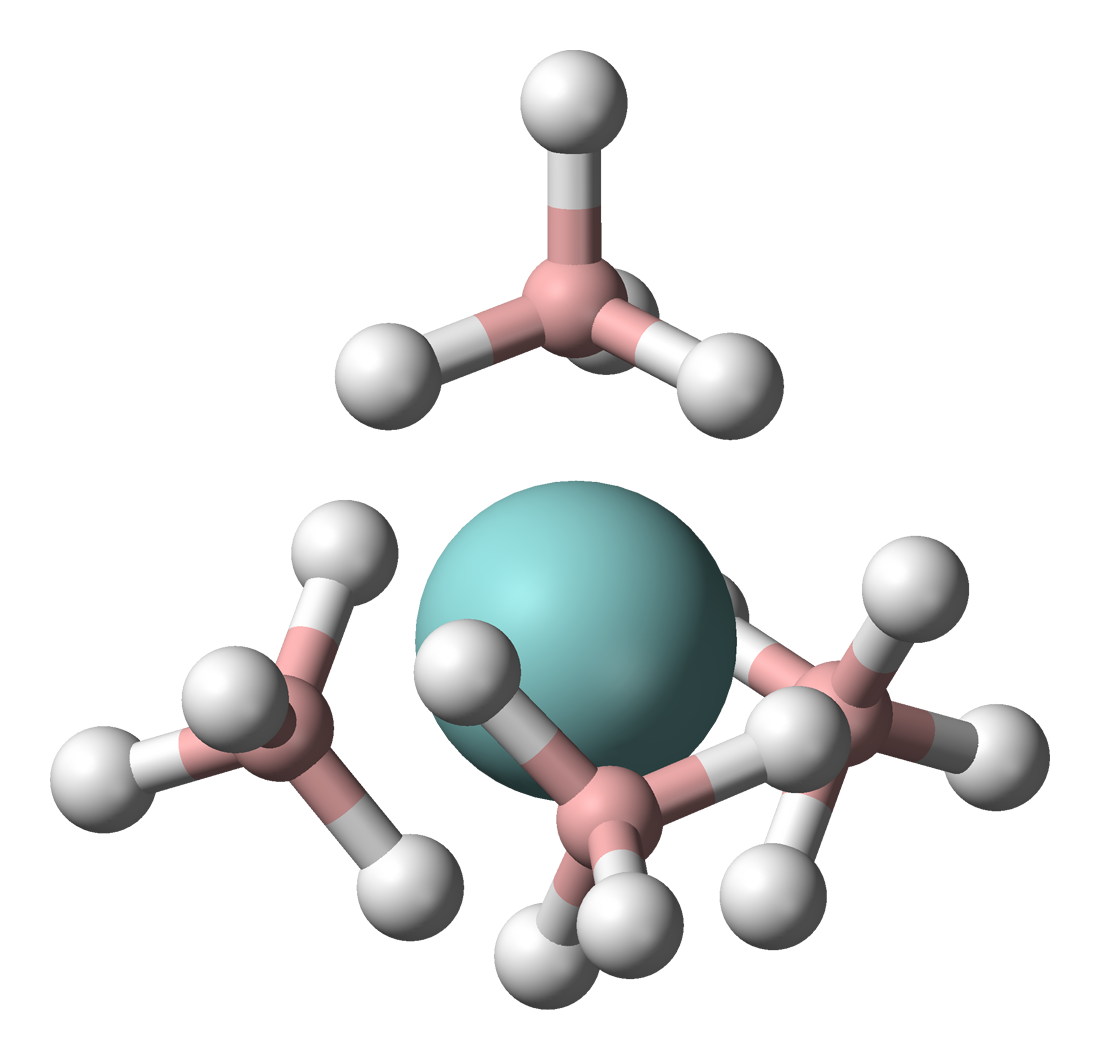
Ball-and-stick model of Zr[BH_{4}]_{4}

Borohydride being a Lewis base, forms coordination complexes. The borohydride ligand binds to the metal by means of one to three bridging hydrogen atoms. Metal borohydride complexes can often be prepared by a simple salt elimination reaction:

ZrCl_{4} + 4 Li[BH_{4}] + → Zr(BH_{4})_{4} + 4 LiCl

=== Decomposition ===
Some metal tetrahydroborates transform on heating to give metal borides. When the borohydride complex is volatile, this decomposition pathway is the basis of chemical vapor deposition (CVD), a way of depositing thin films of metal borides. For example, zirconium diboride ZrB_{2} and hafnium diboride HfB_{2} can be prepared through CVD of the zirconium(IV) tetrahydroborate Zr[BH_{4}]_{4} and hafnium(IV) tetrahydroborate Hf[BH_{4}]_{4}:

M[BH_{4}]_{4} → MB_{2} + B_{2}H_{6} + 5 H_{2}

Metal diborides find uses as coatings because of their hardness, high melting point, strength, resistance to wear and corrosion, and good electrical conductivity.
