= Hermann Irving Schlesinger =

American inorganic chemist (1882–1960)

- Born: October 11, 1882; Milwaukee, Wisconsin, U.S.
- Died: October 3, 1960 (aged 77); Chicago, U.S.
- Education: University of Chicago
- Known for: Boron chemistry
- Awards: Priestley Medal (1959); Willard Gibbs Award (1959)
- Scientific career
- Fields: Chemistry
- Workplaces: University of Chicago
- Doctoral advisor: Julius Stieglitz

Hermann Irving Schlesinger (October 11, 1882 – October 3, 1960) was an American inorganic chemist, working in boron chemistry.

He and Herbert C. Brown discovered sodium borohydride in 1940 and both were involved in the further development of borohydride chemistry.

Schlesinger studied chemistry at the University of Chicago from 1900 till 1905, where he received his Ph.D. for work with Julius Stieglitz. In the following two years, he worked with Walther Nernst at the University of Berlin; with Johannes Thiele at the University of Strasbourg; and with John Jacob Abel at Johns Hopkins University.

From 1907 to 1960, he taught in the department of chemistry at the University of Chicago, rising through the ranks from instructor to full professor in 1922. He administered the department from 1922 to 1946, and retired in 1949.

Schlesinger was honored by membership in the National Academy of Sciences and received the Priestley Medal, the highest honor of the American Chemical Society.

== Bibliography ==
- Schlesinger, H. I.; Brown, H. C.; Abraham, B.; Bond, A. C.; Davidson, N.; Finholt, A. E.; Gilbreath, J. R.; Hoekstra, H.; Horvitz, L.; Hyde, E. K.; Katz, J. J.; Knight, J.; Lad, R. A.; Mayfield, D. L.; Rapp, L.; Ritter, D. M.; Schwartz, A. M.; Sheft, I.; Tuck, L. D.; Walker, A. O. (1953). "New developments in the chemistry of diborane and the borohydrides. General summary". Journal of the American Chemical Society. 75: 186–90. doi:10.1021/ja01097a049.
