= Sodium borohydride =

Chemical compound

- Wireframe model of sodium borohydride

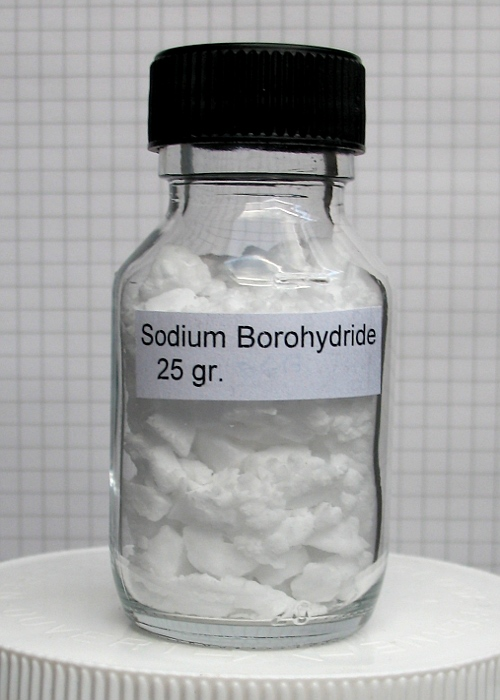

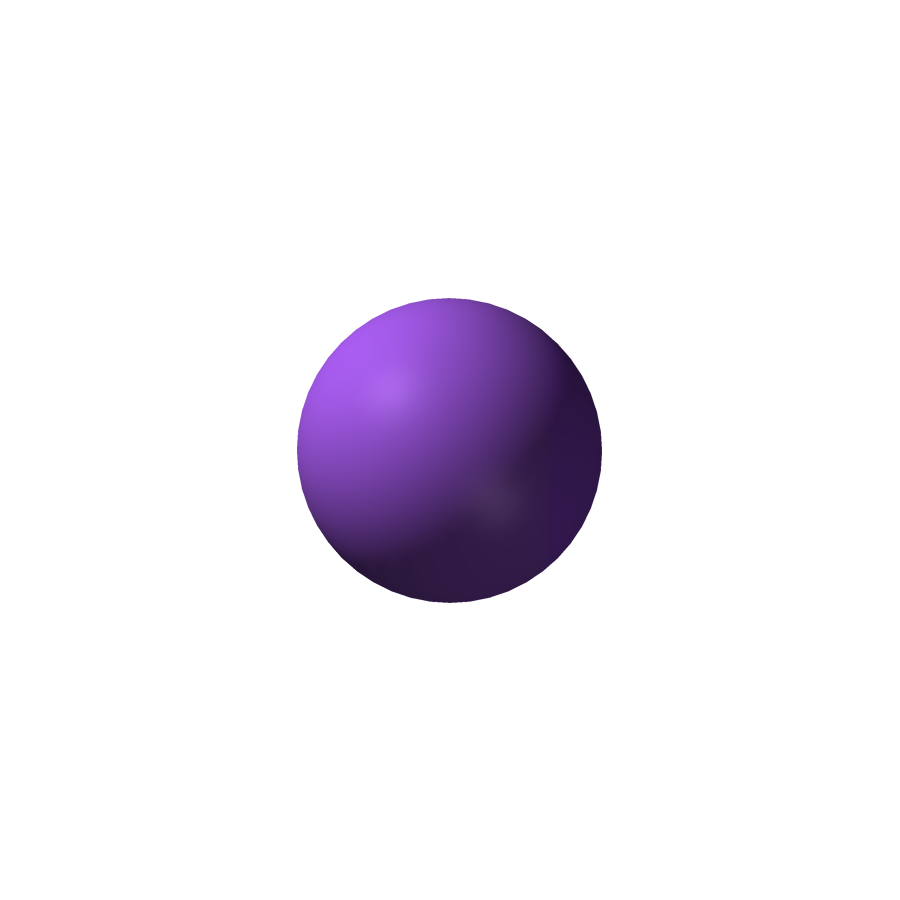

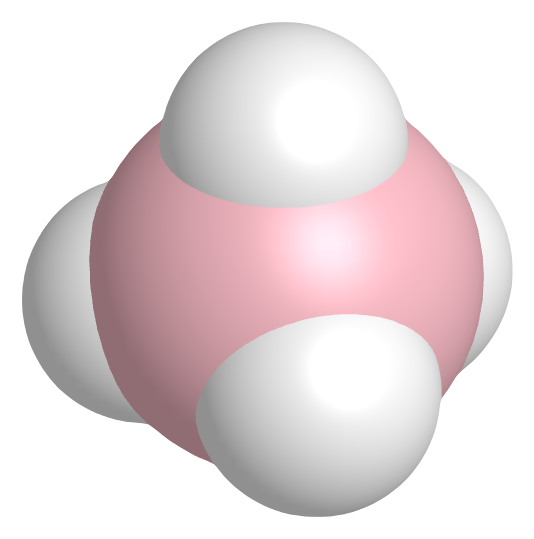

Names
- IUPAC name Sodium tetrahydridoborate(1–)
- Systematic IUPAC name Sodium boranuide

Identifiers
CAS Number	16940-66-2; 15681-89-7 (^{2}D_{4})
3D model (JSmol)	Interactive image
ChEBI	CHEBI:50985
ChemSpider	26189; 9052313 (^{2}D_{4}); 9312193 (^{3}T_{4})
ECHA InfoCard	100.037.262
EC Number	241-004-4
Gmelin Reference	23167
MeSH	Sodium+borohydride
PubChem CID	4311764; 23673181 (^{2}D_{4}); 23671303 (^{3}T_{4})
RTECS number	ED3325000
UNII	87L0B9CPPA
UN number	1426
CompTox Dashboard (EPA)	DTXSID80893977
- InChI: InChI=1S/BH4.Na/h1H4;/q-1;+1 Key: YOQDYZUWIQVZSF-UHFFFAOYSA-N; InChI=1S/BH4.Na/h1H4;/q-1;+1; Key: YOQDYZUWIQVZSF-UHFFF
- SMILES: [Na+].[BH4-]

Properties
Chemical formula	Na[BH_{4}]
Molar mass	37.83 g·mol^{−1}
Appearance	white crystals hygroscopic
Density	1.07 g/cm^{3}
Melting point	400 °C (752 °F; 673 K)(decomposes)
Solubility in water	550 g/L
Solubility	soluble in liquid ammonia, amines, pyridine

Structure
Crystal structure	Cubic (NaCl), cF8
Space group	Fm3̅m, No. 225
Lattice constant	a = 0.6157 nm

Thermochemistry
Heat capacity (C)	86.8 J·mol^{−1} K^{−1}
Std molar entropy (S^{⦵}_{298})	101.3 J·mol^{−1} K^{−1}
Std enthalpy of formation (Δ_{f}H^{⦵}_{298})	−188.6 kJ mol^{−1}
Gibbs free energy (Δ_{f}G^{⦵})	−123.9 kJ mol^{−1}

Hazards
- GHS labelling
Pictograms	(GHS02: Flammable) (GHS06: Toxic) (GHS08: Health hazard) (GHS05: Corrosive)
Signal word	Danger
Hazard statements	H260, H301, H314, H360F
Precautionary statements	P201, P231+P232, P280, P308+P313, P370+P378, P402+P404
NFPA 704 (fire diamond)	3 1 2 W
Flash point	70 °C (158 °F; 343 K)
Autoignition temperature	ca. 220 °C (428 °F; 493 K)
Explosive limits	3%
- Lethal dose or concentration (LD, LC)
LD_{50} (median dose)	160 mg/kg (Oral – Rat); 230 mg/kg (Dermal – Rabbit)

Related compounds
Other anions	Sodium cyanoborohydride Sodium hydride Sodium borate Borax; Sodium aluminum hydride
Other cations	Lithium borohydride Potassium borohydride
Related compounds	Lithium aluminium hydride Sodium triacetoxyborohydride
- Except where otherwise noted, data are given for materials in their standard state (at 25 °C [77 °F], 100 kPa). verify (what is ?) Infobox references

Sodium borohydride, also known as sodium tetrahydridoborate and sodium tetrahydroborate, is an inorganic compound with the formula NaBH_{4} (sometimes written as Na[BH_{4}]). It is a white crystalline solid, usually encountered as an aqueous basic solution. Sodium borohydride is a reducing agent that finds application in papermaking and dye industries. It is also used as a reagent in organic synthesis.

The compound was discovered in the 1940s by H. I. Schlesinger, who led a team seeking volatile uranium compounds. Results of this wartime research were declassified and published in 1953.

== Properties ==
The compound is soluble in alcohols, certain ethers, and water, although it slowly hydrolyzes.

Solvent	Solubility (g/(100 mL))
CH_{3}OH	13
CH_{3}CH_{2}OH	3.16
Diglyme	5.15
(CH_{3}CH_{2})_{2}O	insoluble

Sodium borohydride is an odorless white to gray-white microcrystalline powder that often forms lumps. It can be purified by recrystallization from warm (50 °C) diglyme. Sodium borohydride is soluble in protic solvents such as water and lower alcohols. It also reacts with these protic solvents to produce H_{2}; however, these reactions are fairly slow. Complete decomposition of a methanol solution requires nearly 90 min at 20 °C. It decomposes in neutral or acidic aqueous solutions, but is stable at pH 14.

=== Structure ===
NaBH_{4} is a salt, consisting of the tetrahedral BH_{4}^{−} anion. The solid is known to exist as three polymorphs: α, β and γ. The stable phase at room temperature and pressure is α-NaBH_{4}, which is cubic and adopts an NaCl-type structure, in the Fm3̅m space group. At a pressure of 6.3 GPa, the structure changes to the tetragonal β-NaBH_{4} (space group P42_{1}c) and at 8.9 GPa, the orthorhombic γ-NaBH_{4} (space group Pnma) becomes the most stable.

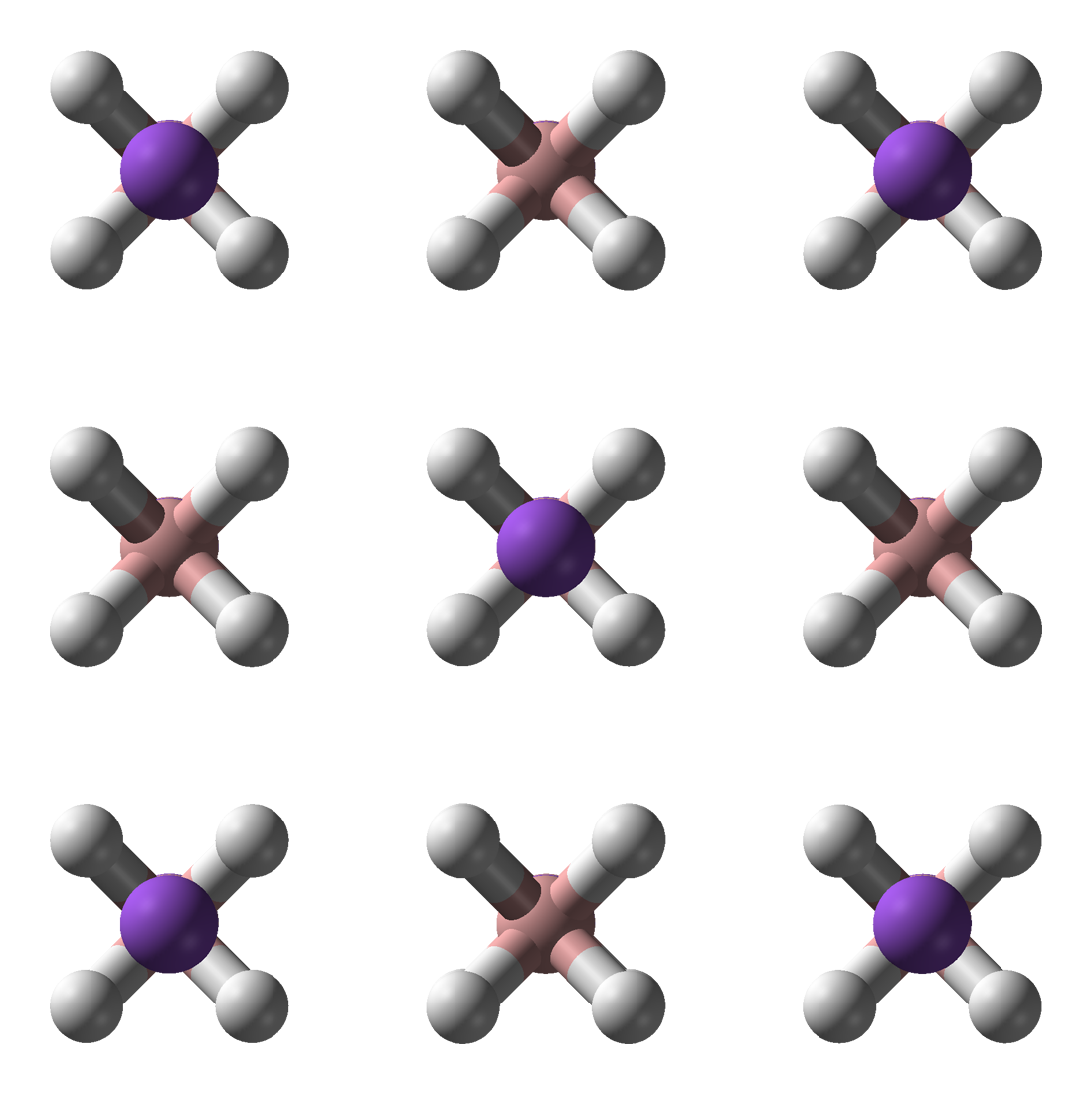
α-NaBH_{4}

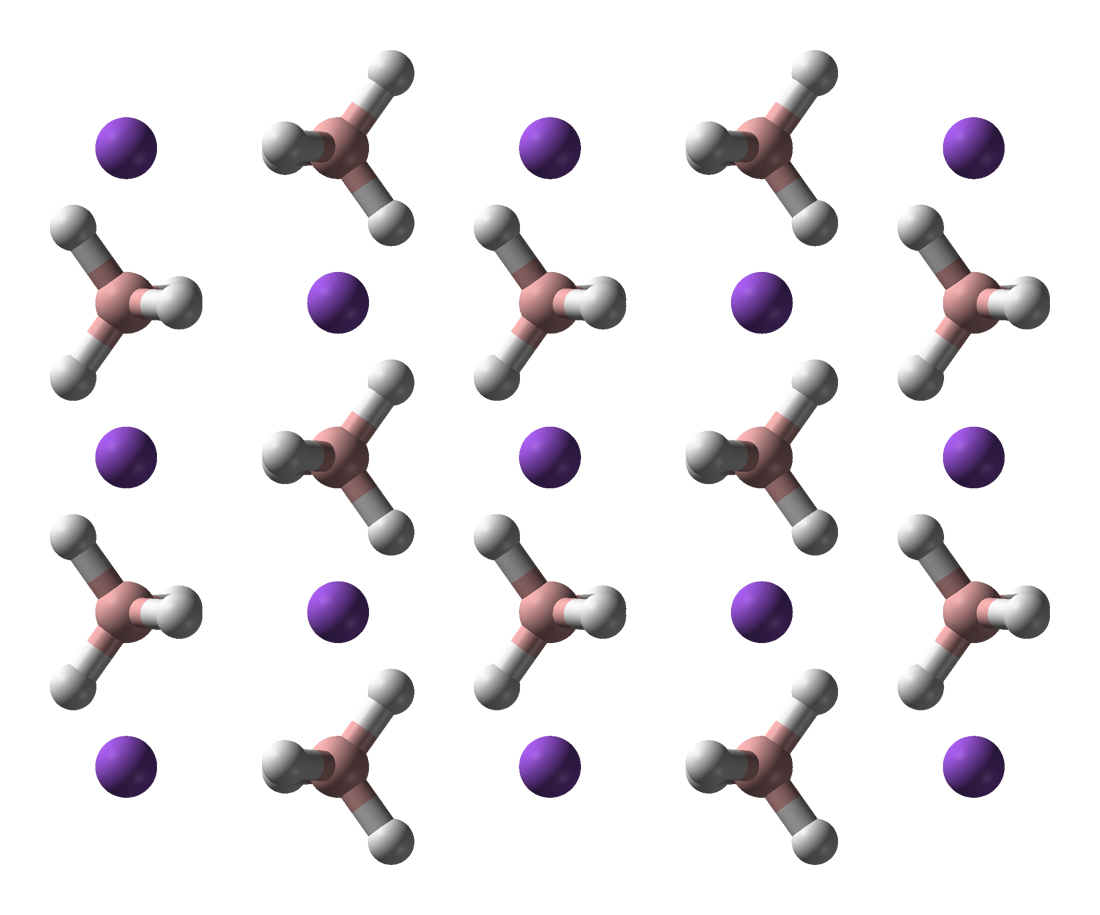
β-NaBH_{4}

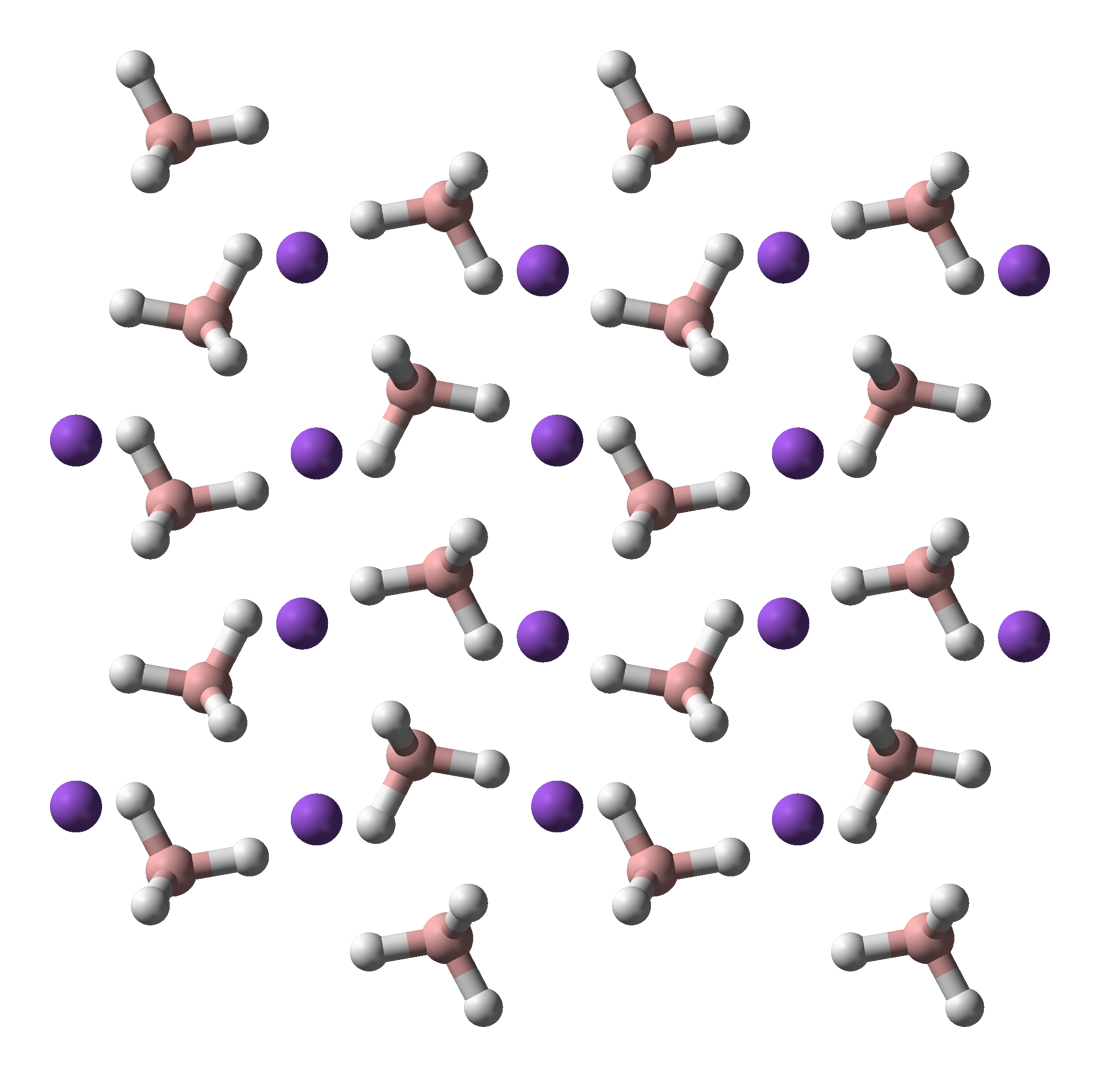
γ-NaBH_{4}

== Synthesis and handling ==
For commercial NaBH_{4} production, the Brown-Schlesinger process and the Bayer process are the most popular methods. In the Brown-Schlesinger process, sodium borohydride is industrially prepared from sodium hydride (produced by reacting Na and H_{2}) and trimethyl borate at 250–270 °C:

B(OCH_{3})_{3} + 4 NaH → NaBH_{4} + 3 NaOCH_{3}

Millions of kilograms are produced annually, far exceeding the production levels of any other hydride reducing agent. In the Bayer process, it is produced from inorganic borates, including borosilicate glass and borax (Na_{2}B_{4}O_{7}):

Na_{2}B_{4}O_{7} + 16 Na + 8 H_{2} + 7 SiO_{2} → 4 NaBH_{4} + 7 Na_{2}SiO_{3}

Magnesium hydride is a less expensive reductant, and could in principle be used instead:

8 MgH_{2} + Na_{2}B_{4}O_{7} + Na_{2}CO_{3} → 4 NaBH_{4} + 8 MgO + CO_{2}

and

2 MgH_{2} + NaBO_{2} → NaBH_{4} + 2 MgO

== Reactivity ==
=== Organic synthesis ===
NaBH_{4} reduces many organic carbonyls, depending on the conditions. Most typically, it is used in the laboratory for converting ketones and aldehydes to alcohols. These reductions proceed in two stages, formation of the alkoxide followed by hydrolysis:

NaBH_{4} + 4 R_{2}C=O → NaO−CHR_{2} + B(O−CHR_{2})_{3}
NaO−CHR_{2} + B(O−CHR_{2})_{3} + 4 H_{2}O → 4 HO−CHR_{2} + NaOH + B(OH)_{3}

It also efficiently reduces acyl chlorides, anhydrides, α-hydroxylactones, thioesters, and imines at room temperature or below. It reduces esters slowly and inefficiently with excess reagent and/or elevated temperatures, while carboxylic acids and amides are not reduced at all.

Nevertheless, an alcohol, often methanol or ethanol, is generally the solvent of choice for sodium borohydride reductions of ketones and aldehydes. The mechanism of ketone and aldehyde reduction has been scrutinized by kinetic studies, and contrary to popular depictions in textbooks, the mechanism does not involve a 4-membered transition state like alkene hydroboration, or a six-membered transition state involving a molecule of the alcohol solvent. Hydrogen-bonding activation is required, as no reduction occurs in an aprotic solvent like diglyme. However, the rate order in alcohol is 1.5, while carbonyl compound and borohydride are both first order, suggesting a mechanism more complex than one involving a six-membered transition state that includes only a single alcohol molecule. It was suggested that the simultaneous activation of the carbonyl compound and borohydride occurs, via interaction with the alcohol and alkoxide ion, respectively, and that the reaction proceeds through an open transition state.

α,β-Unsaturated ketones tend to be reduced by NaBH_{4} in a 1,4-sense, although mixtures are often formed. Addition of cerium chloride improves the selectivity for 1,2-reduction of unsaturated ketones (Luche reduction). α,β-Unsaturated esters also undergo 1,4-reduction in the presence of NaBH_{4}.

The NaBH_{4}-MeOH system, formed by the addition of methanol to sodium borohydride in refluxing THF, reduces esters to the corresponding alcohols. Mixing water or an alcohol with the borohydride converts some of it into unstable hydride ester, which is more efficient at reduction, but the reductant eventually decomposes spontaneously to produce hydrogen gas and borates. The same reaction can also occur intramolecularly: an α-ketoester converts into a diol, since the alcohol produced attacks the borohydride to produce an ester of the borohydride, which then reduces the neighboring ester.

The reactivity of NaBH_{4} can be enhanced or augmented by a variety of compounds.

Many additives for modifying the reactivity of sodium borohydride have been developed as indicated by the following incomplete listing.

Additives for sodium borohydride
additive	synthetic applications	page in Smith and March	comment
AlCl_{3}	reduction of ketones to methylene	1837	
BiCl_{3}	converts epoxides to allylic alcohols	1316	
(C_{6}H_{5}Te)_{2}	reduction of nitroarenes	1862	
CeCl_{3}	reduction of ketones in the presence of aldehydes	1794	Luche reduction
CoCl_{2}	reduction of azides to amines	1822	
InCl_{3}	hydrogenolysis of alkyl bromides, double reduction of unsaturated ketones	1825, 1793	
LiCl	amine oxides to amines	1846	lithium borohydride
NiCl_{2}	deoxygenation of sulfoxides, hydrogenolysis of aryl tosylates, desulfurization, reduction of nitriles	1851,1831, 991, 1814	nickel boride
TiCl_{4}	denitrosatation of nitrosamines	1823	
ZnCl_{2}	reduction of aldehydes	1793	
ZrCl_{4}	reduction of disulfides, reduction of azides to amines, cleavage of allyl aryl ethers	1853, 1822, 582	

=== Oxidation ===
Oxidation with iodine in tetrahydrofuran gives borane–tetrahydrofuran, which can reduce carboxylic acids to alcohols.

Partial oxidation of borohydride with iodine gives octahydrotriborate:

3 BH_{4}^{−} + I_{2} → B_{3}H_{8}^{−} + 2 H_{2} + 2 I^{−}

=== Coordination chemistry ===
BH_{4}^{−} is a ligand for metal ions. Such borohydride complexes are often prepared by the action of NaBH_{4} (or LiBH_{4}) on the corresponding metal halide. One example is the titanocene derivative:

2 (C_{5}H_{5})_{2}TiCl_{2} + 4 NaBH_{4} → 2 (C_{5}H_{5})_{2}TiBH_{4} + 4 NaCl + B_{2}H_{6} + H_{2}

=== Protonolysis and hydrolysis ===
NaBH_{4} reacts with water and alcohols, with evolution of hydrogen gas and formation of the corresponding borate, the reaction being especially fast at low pH. Exploiting this reactivity, sodium borohydride has been studied as a prototypes of the direct borohydride fuel cell.

NaBH_{4} + 2 H_{2}O → NaBO_{2} + 4 H_{2} (ΔH^{⦵} < 0)

== Applications ==
=== Paper manufacture ===
The dominant application of sodium borohydride is the production of sodium dithionite from sulfur dioxide: Sodium dithionite is used as a bleaching agent for wood pulp and in the dyeing industry.

It has been tested as pretreatment for pulping of wood, but is too costly to be commercialized.

=== Chemical synthesis ===
Sodium borohydride reduces aldehydes and ketones to give the related alcohols. This reaction is used in the production of various antibiotics including chloramphenicol, dihydrostreptomycin, and thiophenicol. Various steroids and vitamin A are prepared using sodium borohydride in at least one step.

=== Niche or abandoned applications ===
Sodium borohydride has been considered as a way to store hydrogen for hydrogen-fueled vehicles, as it is safer (being stable in dry air) and more efficient on a weight basis than most other alternatives. The hydrogen can be released by simple hydrolysis of the borohydride. However, such a usage would need a cheap, relatively simple, and energy-efficient process to recycle the hydrolysis product, sodium metaborate, back to the borohydride. In 2022, Curtin University developed a chemical process using a catalyst to perform this.

Although practical temperatures and pressures for hydrogen storage have not been achieved, in 2012 a core–shell nanostructure of sodium borohydride was used to store, release and reabsorb hydrogen under moderate conditions.

Skilled professional conservator/restorers have used sodium borohydride to minimize or reverse foxing in old books and documents.

Sodium borohydride has also experimentally been used as part of a green hypergolic rocket propellant. A rocket engine at Purdue University's Zucrow Labs was run using Triglyme and sodium borohydride (of which the sodium borohydride was 8% by weight) as the fuel and hydrogen peroxide as the oxidizer. The propellant mix proved to be difficult to work with and likely will not be used outside of research purposes.

=== Education ===
A common laboratory demonstration "uncooks" eggs with sodium borohydride, as hydride reagents reduce disulfides to thiols. To uncook an egg, breaking the hydrogen and hydrophobic bonds is not enough. As sodium borohydride is toxic, the egg white uncooked after three hours is not edible, but Vitamin C can be used instead.

== See also ==
Many derivatives and analogues of sodium borohydride exhibit modified reactivity of value in organic synthesis.

- Sodium triacetoxyborohydride, a milder reductant owing to the presence of more electron-withdrawing acetate in place of hydride.
- Sodium triethylborohydride, a stronger reductant owing to the presence of electron-donating ethyl groups in place of hydride.
- sodium cyanoborohydride, a milder reductant owing to the presence of more electron-withdrawing cyanide in place of hydride. Useful for reductive aminations.
- Lithium borohydride, a more strongly reducing reagent.
- L-selectride (lithium tri-sec-butylborohydride), a more strongly reducing derivative.
- Lithium aluminium hydride, a more strongly reducing reagent, capable of reducing esters and amides.
