= Carbonyl reduction =

Organic reduction of any carbonyl group by a reducing agent

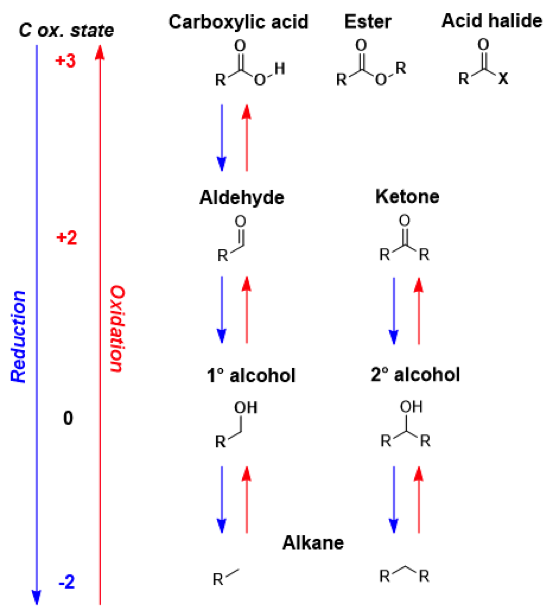
Oxidation ladders such as this one are used to illustrate sequences of carbonyls which can be interconverted through oxidations or reductions.

In organic chemistry, carbonyl reduction is the conversion of any carbonyl group, usually to an alcohol. It is a common transformation that is practiced in many ways. Ketones, aldehydes, carboxylic acids, esters, amides, and acid halides - some of the most pervasive functional groups, -comprise carbonyl compounds. Carboxylic acids, esters, and acid halides can be reduced to either aldehydes or a step further to primary alcohols, depending on the strength of the reducing agent. Aldehydes and ketones can be reduced respectively to primary and secondary alcohols. In deoxygenation, the alcohol group can be further reduced and removed altogether by replacement with hydrogen.

Two broad strategies exist for carbonyl reduction. One method, which is favored in industry, uses hydrogen as the reductant. This approach is called hydrogenation and requires metal catalysts. The other broad approach employs stoichiometric reagents that deliver H^{−} and H^{+} separately. This article focuses on the use of these reagents. Prominent among these reagents are the alkali metal salts of borohydrides and aluminium hydrides.

== General considerations ==
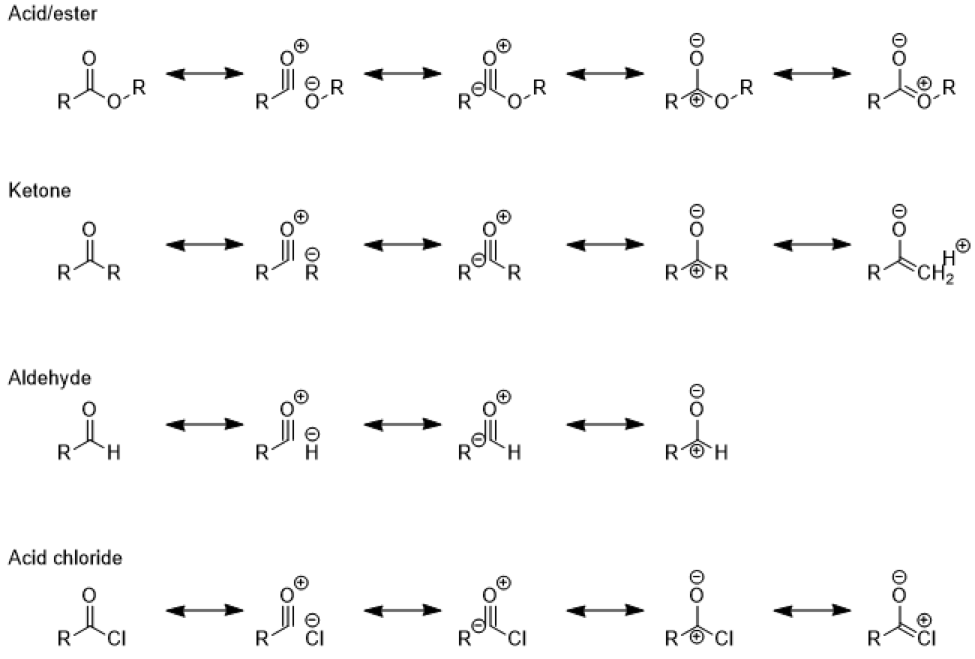
Resonance structures of different carbonyls, ordered from most stable (least reactive) to least stable (most reactive)

In terms of reaction mechanism, metal hydrides effect nucleophilic addition of hydride to the carbonyl carbon. The ease of addition of hydride to the carbonyl is affected by electrophilicity and bulk of the carbonyl as well as the corresponding electronic and steric properties of the hydride reagent. The result of these trends is that acid halides, ketones, and aldehydes are usually the most readily reduced compounds, while acids and esters require stronger reducing agents. Importantly and characteristically, these hydride reagents generally do not attack C=C bonds.

Several factors contribute to the strength of metal hydride reducing agents. The reducing power of borohydride reagents is affected by the counter ion, such as Na^{+} vs Li^{+} which can activate carbonyls by coordinating to the carbonyl oxygen. Li^{+} binds to carbonyl oxygen more strongly than does Na^{+}. In the case of tetrahydroaluminates, however, NaAlH_{4} and LiAlH_{4} behave similarly. Many metal additives have been investigated. For example, zinc borohydride, nominally Zn(BH_{4})_{2}, is used for mild selective reduction of aldehydes and ketones in the presence of other reducible groups.

The central metal (usually B vs Al) strongly influences reducing agent's strength. Aluminum hydrides are more nucleophilic and better reducing agents relative to borohydrides. The relatively weak reducer sodium borohydride is typically used for reducing ketones and aldehydes. It tolerates many functional groups (nitro group, nitrile, ester).

In their handling properties, lithium aluminium hydride and sodium borohydride (and their derivatives) strongly differ. NaBH_{4} is far easier to handle than LiAlH_{4}, being air stable for weeks. It can be used with water or ethanol as solvents, whereas LiAlH_{4} reacts explosively with protic solvents.

Substituents on the boron or aluminium modulate the power, selectivity, and handling properties of these reducing agents. Electron-withdrawing groups such as acetoxy and cyano lower the reducing power such that NaBH(OAc)_{3} and NaBH_{3}(CN) are weak reducing agents. Electron-donating groups such as alkyl groups enhance the reducing strength. superhydride (lithium triethylborohydride) and L-selectride are strong reductant. They are correspondingly hazardous to handle.

The following table illustrates which carbonyl functional groups can be reduced by which reducing agents (some of these reagents vary in efficacy depending on reaction conditions):

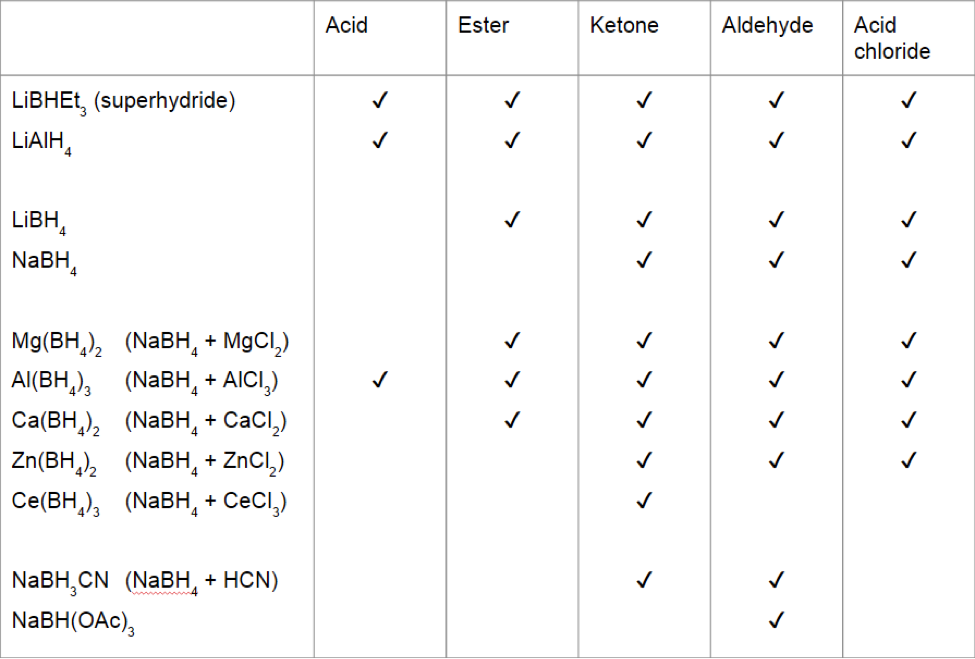
Table of possible reactions between carbonyl groups and reducing agents

== Substrates ==
Ketones are less reactive than aldehydes, because of greater steric effects, and because the extra alkyl group contributes electron density to the C=O bond, making it less electrophilic. Since, aldehydes reduce more easily than ketones, they require milder reagents and milder conditions. At the other extreme, carboxylic acids, amides, and esters are poorly electrophilic and require strong reducing agents.

=== Carboxylic acid and esters ===
Relative to aldehydes and ketones, carboxylic acid are difficult to reduce. Lithium aluminium hydride is typically effective. The first step involves deprotonation of the carboxylic acid. The final step in the reduction of carboxylic acids and esters is hydrolysis of the aluminium alcoxide. Esters (and amides) are more easily reduced than the parent carboxylic acids. Their reduction affords alcohols and amines, respectively. The idealized equation for the reduction of an ester by lithium aluminium hydride is:

2 RCO_{2}R' + LiAlH_{4} → LiAl(OCH_{2}R)_{2}(OR')
LiAl(OCH_{2}R)_{2}(OR') + 4 H_{2}O → LiAl(OH)_{4} + 2 HOCH_{2}R + 2 HOR'

Sodium borohydride can, under some circumstances, be used for ester reduction, especially with additives.

Forming aldehydes from carboxylic acid derivatives is challenging because weaker reducing agents (NaBH_{4}) are often very slow at reducing esters and carboxylic acids, whereas stronger reducing agents (LiAlH_{4}) immediately reduce the formed aldehyde to an alcohol. One strategy is transacylate to other acyl derivatives amenable to partial reduction, as discussed in § Acid chlorides to aldehydes.

=== Acid chlorides to aldehydes ===
Traditionally, acid chlorides are reduced to aldehydes with sterically hindered hydride donors. The reducing agent DIBAL-H (diisobutylaluminium hydride) is often used for this purpose, although it normally reduces any carbonyl. DIBAL-H can selectively reduce acid chlorides to the aldehyde level if only one equivalent is used at low temperatures. LiAlH(OtBu)_{3} (formed from LiAlH_{4} and tBuOH in situ) behaves similarly. The idealized equation for the reduction of an acid chloride to an aldehyde by lithium aluminium hydride is:

RCOCl + LiAlH(OtBu)_{3} → LiCl + "Al(OtBu)_{3}" + RCHO

The traditional method - hindered hydrides and reactive carbonyls - is limited by narrow substrate scope and great dependence on reaction conditions. One workaround is the Rosenmund reaction, which reduces acyl chlorides using hydrogen gas and a catalyst of palladium on barium sulfate. The small catalyst surface area prevents over-reduction.

Alternatively, there are many multi-step reductions to aldehydes. The simplest reduces the acyl chloride all the way down to an alcohol, then oxidizes it back up to an aldehyde. Other techniques use the acyl chloride as an acylant. One can form a thioester, Weinreb amide, or Reissert compound, then reduce the new species to an aldehyde through (respectively) the Fukuyama reduction, Weinreb reaction, or Reissert workup.

In the Weinreb reduction, a Weinreb amide is treated with lithium aluminum hydride:

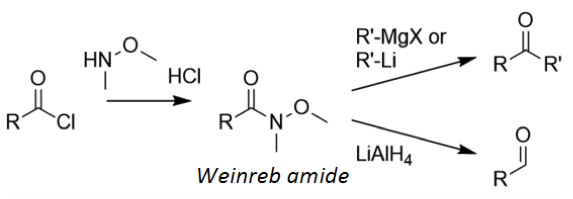

Reduction halts at the aldehyde, because the hemiacetal intermediate is a stable chelate, and much less electrophilic than the collapsed carbonyl:

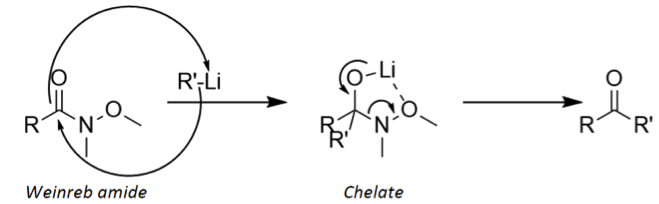

In the Fukuyama reduction, the thioester is then reduced to an aldehyde by a silyl hydride with a palladium catalyst:

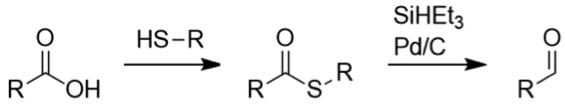
Conversion to thioester followed by Fukuyama reduction

=== Aldehydes and ketones ===
The idealized equation for the reduction of a ketone by sodium borohydride is:

4 RCOR' + NaBH_{4} → NaB(OCHRR')_{4}
NaB(OCHRR')_{4}) + 4 H_{2}O → "NaB(OH)_{4}" + 4 HOCHRR' + 4 HOR'

Complete idealized mechanism for the reduction of ketone with sodium borohydride.

==== Reductive amination ====

In addition to their reduction to alcohols, aldehydes and ketones can be converted to amines, i.e., reductive amination. Because of its cyano substituent, NaBH_{3}CN is a weak reducer at moderate pH (>4), so it preferentially reduces iminium cations that exist in the presence of carbonyls:

==== α,β-unsaturated carbonyls ====
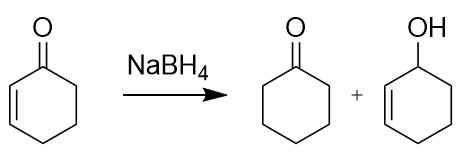

When an α,β-unsaturated carbonyl is reduced, three products can result: an allyl alcohol from simple carbonyl reduction, a saturated ketone or aldehyde resulting from 1,4‑reduction (also called conjugate reduction), or the saturated alcohol from double reduction. Use of NaBH_{4} can give any of these results, but InCl_{3} or NiCl_{2} catalyze specifically 1,4‑reductions. Potassium or lithium tri(sec‑butyl)borohydride sometimes selects 1,4‑reductions, but can be stymied by steric hindrance. Triphenylphosphinocopper hydride clusters directs catalytic hydrogenation to perform specifically conjugate reduction.

To selectively form the allyl alcohol and avoid the 1,4 product, the Luche reduction uses "cerium borohydride" generated in situ from NaBH_{4} and CeCl_{3}(H_{2}O)_{7} The hydride source Zn(BH_{4})_{2} also shows 1,2 selectivity, as well as greater diastereoselectivity. It does so by coordinating not only to the carbonyl oxygen but also to adjacent atoms:

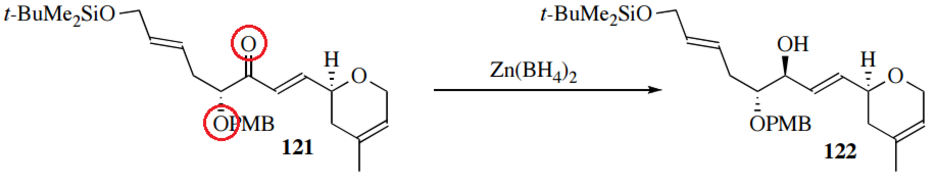

== Hydrogenolysis ==
A special case of carbonyl reduction entails complete deoxygenation, i.e. hydrogenolysis. This result is often undesirable because it involves defunctionalization.

Some reactions for this transformation include the Clemmensen reduction (in strongly acidic conditions) and the Wolff–Kishner reduction (in strongly basic conditions), as well as the various modifications of Wolff-Kishner reaction. The Caglioti modification, for instance, uses tosylhydrazone with a hydride donor in milder conditions with no base; the Myers modification substitutes hydrazine with bis(tert-butyldimethylsilyl)-hydrazine, uses milder conditions at room temperature, and is rapid and efficient.

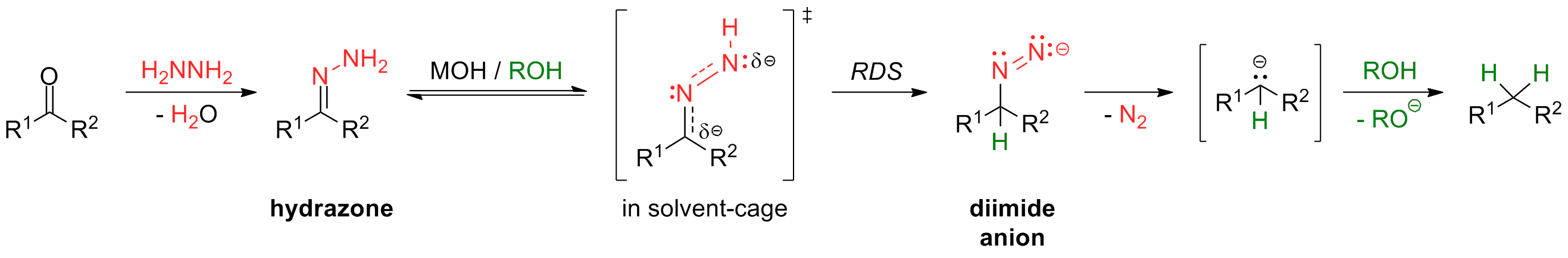
Mechanism of Wolff-Kishner reduction

Aromatic carbonyls are more readily reduced to their respective alkanes than aliphatic compounds. For example, ketones are reduced to their respective alkyl benzenes by catalytic hydrogenation or by Birch reduction under mild conditions.

== Stereoselectivity ==
=== Diastereoselective reduction ===
In the reduction of cyclohexanones, the hydride source can attack axially to produce an equatorial alcohol, or equatorially to produce an axial alcohol. In axial attack (shown in red), the hydride encounters 1,3-diaxial strain. In equatorial attack (shown in blue), the hydride avoids the 1,3-diaxial interaction, but the substrate undergoes unfavorable torsional strain when the newly formed alcohol and added hydrogen atom eclipse each other in the reaction intermediate (as shown in the Newman projection for the axial alcohol).

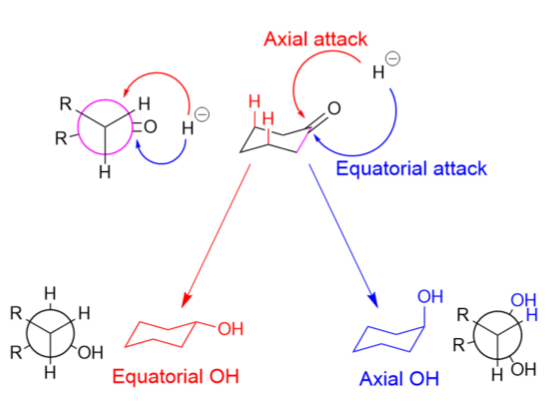

Large reducing agents, such as LiBH(Me_{2}CHCHMe)_{3}, are hindered by the 1,3-axial interactions and therefore attack equatorially. Small reducing agents, such as NaBH_{4}, preferentially attack axially in order to avoid the eclipsing interactions, because the 1,3-diaxial interaction for small molecules is minimal; stereoelectronic reasons have also been cited for small reducing agents' axial preference. Making the substrate bulkier (and increasing 1,3-axial interactions), however, decreases the prevalence of axial attacks, even for small hydride donors.

=== Enantioselective reduction ===
When asymmetrical ketones are reduced, the resulting secondary alcohol has a chiral center whose can be controlled using chiral transition states or catalysts. In the Evans-Saksena reduction, a nearby alcohol directs the reduction.

Well-known carbonyl reductions in asymmetric synthesis are the Noyori asymmetric hydrogenation (beta-ketoester reduction/Ru/BINAP) and the CBS reduction (BH_{3}, proline derived chiral catalyst).

== History and alternative methods ==
The Bouveault–Blanc reduction, employing a mixture of sodium metal in the presence of alcohols, was an early method for reduction of carbonyls. It is now largely obsolete. Subsequent to the discovery of the Bouveault–Blanc reduction, many methods were developed, including the major breakthrough of catalytic hydrogenation where H_{2} serves as the reductant. Salts boron and aluminium hydrides, discovered starting in the 1940s, proved to be highly convenient reagents for carbonyl reduction.

In the Meerwein-Ponndorf-Verley reduction, aluminium isopropoxide functions as the hydride source. The status of this reaction has been summarized thusly "the synthetic organic chemist will rarely attempt to use such a conventional technique as the Meerwein−Ponndorf−Verley (MPV) reaction".

== See also ==
- Baker's yeast, a biotransformation route for carbonyl reductions.
