= Alkalide =

Chemical compound

Ethylamine solution of sodide

An alkalide is a chemical compound in which alkali metal atoms are anions (negative ions) with a charge or oxidation state of −1. Until the first discovery of alkalides in the 1970s, alkali metals were known to appear in salts only as cations (positive ions) with a charge or oxidation state of +1. These types of compounds are of theoretical interest due to their unusual stoichiometry and low ionization potentials. Alkalide compounds are chemically related to the electrides, salts in which trapped electrons are effectively the anions.

== "Normal" alkali metal compounds ==
Alkali metals form many well-known stable salts. Sodium chloride (common table salt), Na^{+}Cl^{−}, illustrates the usual role of an alkali metal such as sodium. In the empirical formula for this ionic compound, the positively charged sodium ion is balanced by a negatively charged chloride ion. The traditional explanation for stable Na^{+} is that the loss of one electron from elemental sodium to produce a cation with charge of +1 produces a stable closed-shell electron configuration.

== Nomenclature and known cases ==
There are known alkalides for some of the alkali metals:

- Sodide or natride, Na^{−}
- Potasside or kalide, K^{−}
- Rubidide, Rb^{−}
- Caeside, Cs^{−}

Alkalides of the other alkali metals have not yet been discovered:

- Lithide, Li^{−}
- Francide, Fr^{−}

== Examples ==
Normally, alkalides are thermally labile due to the high reactivity of the alkalide anion, which is theoretically able to break most covalent bonds including the carbon–oxygen bonds in a typical cryptand. The introduction of a special cryptand ligand containing amines instead of ether linkages has allowed the isolation of kalides and natrides that are stable at room temperature.

Several alkalides have been synthesized:

- A compound in which hydrogen ions are encapsulated by adamanzane, known as hydrogen natride or "inverse sodium hydride" (hydrogen sodide or hydrogen natride H^{+}Na^{−}), has been observed.
- Sodium-crypt natride, [Na(cryptand[2.2.2])]^{+}Na^{−}, has been observed. This salt contains both Na^{+} and Na^{−}. The cryptand isolates and stabilizes the Na^{+}, preventing it from being reduced by the Na^{−}.
- Barium azacryptand-sodide, Ba^{2+}[H_{5}Azacryptand[2.2.2]]^{−}Na^{−}⋅2CH_{3}NH_{2}, has been synthesized.
- Anionic sodium dimers (Na_{2})^{2−} have been observed.
