= K-selectride =

Names
- Other names potassium Tri-sec-butylborohydride

Identifiers
CAS Number	54575-49-4
3D model (JSmol)	Interactive image
ChemSpider	3509885
ECHA InfoCard	100.053.837
EC Number	259-241-7
PubChem CID	23712865
UNII	6HK5NKZ8D3
CompTox Dashboard (EPA)	DTXSID60969821 DTXSID10401741, DTXSID60969821
- InChI: InChI=1S/C12H27B.K/c1-7-10(4)13(11(5)8-2)12(6)9-3;/h10-12H,7-9H2,1-6H3;/q-1;+1 Key: NHYQAKNGPZLNOH-UHFFFAOYSA-N
- SMILES: [B-](C(C)CC)(C(C)CC)C(C)CC.[K+]

Properties
Chemical formula	C_{12}H_{28}BK
Molar mass	222.26 g·mol^{−1}
Appearance	colorless solid (sold as a solution)
- Except where otherwise noted, data are given for materials in their standard state (at 25 °C [77 °F], 100 kPa). Infobox references

K-selectride is the organoboron compound with the formula KBH(C_{4}H_{9})_{3}. It is the potassium salt of tri(sec-butyl)borohydride. The compound is sold as solution in THF. It is a strong reducing agent. Solutions are pyrophoric and highly reactive toward water and protic compounds. It is handled using air-free technique. It is produced by the reaction of tri(sec-butyl)borane with potassium hydride. The reagent is used to reduce ketones to alcohols.

== Related compounds ==
- Lithium trisiamylborohydride
- Lithium triethylborohydride ("Super hydride")
- L-selectride Li[(CH_{3}CH_{2}CH(CH_{3}))_{3}BH]
