= Caesium hydride =

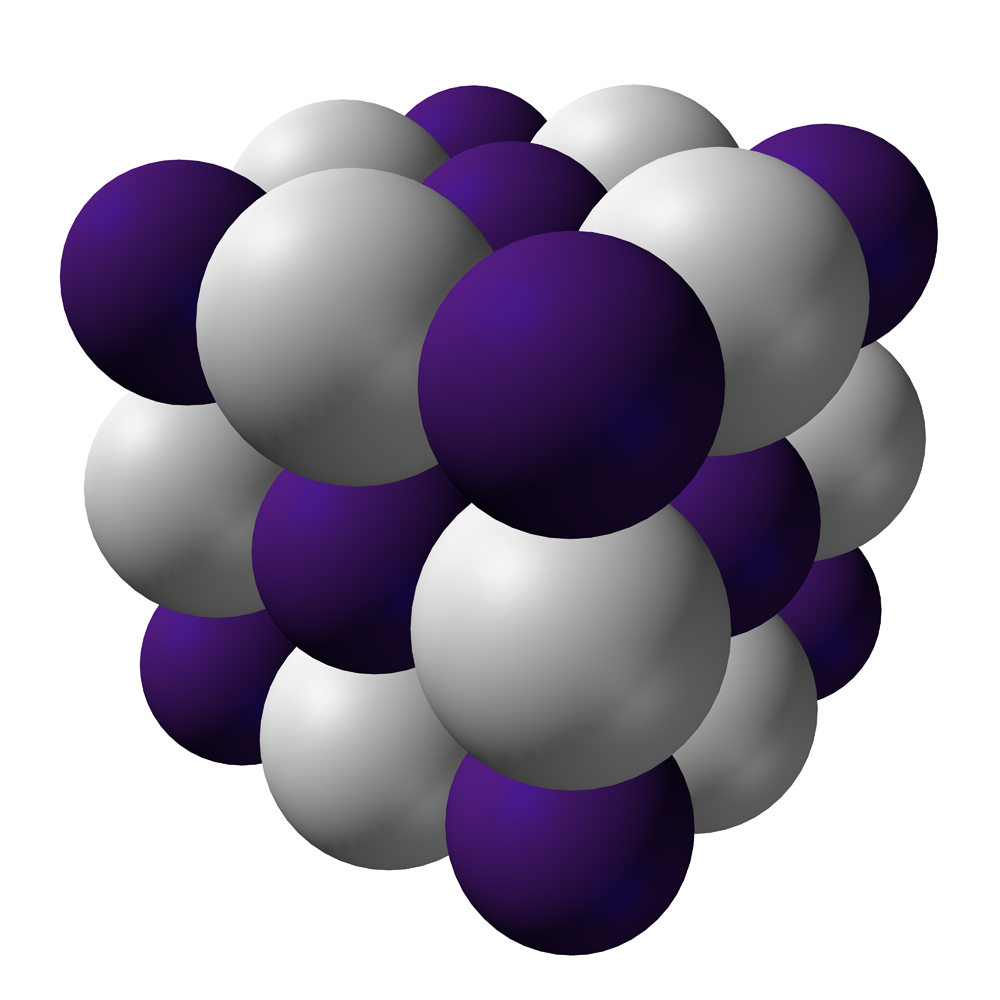
- Caesium cation, Cs^{+} Hydrogen anion, H^{−}

Names
- IUPAC name Caesium hydride
- Other names Cesium hydride

Identifiers
CAS Number	13772-47-9
3D model (JSmol)	Interactive image
ChemSpider	122830
PubChem CID	139281
CompTox Dashboard (EPA)	DTXSID10276375
- InChI: InChI=1S/Cs.H/q+1;-1 Key: HXCOCQWMKNUQSA-UHFFFAOYSA-N; InChI=1S/Cs.H/q+1;-1 Key: HXCOCQWMKNUQSA-UHFFFAOYSA-N
- SMILES: [H-].[Cs+]

Properties
Chemical formula	CsH
Molar mass	133.913 g·mol^{−1}
Appearance	White cubic crystals
Density	3.42 g/cm^{3}
Melting point	528 °C (982 °F; 801 K)
Solubility in water	reacts

Structure
Crystal structure	Face centered cubic
Coordination geometry	Octahedral

Thermochemistry
Std enthalpy of formation (Δ_{f}H^{⦵}_{298})	−54.2 kJ⋅mol^{−1}
Enthalpy of fusion (Δ_{f}H^{⦵}_{fus})	15 kJ⋅mol^{−1}

Related compounds
Other anions	Caesium fluoride; Caesium chloride; Caesium bromide; Caesium iodide
Other cations	Lithium hydride; Sodium hydride; Potassium hydride; Rubidium hydride
- Except where otherwise noted, data are given for materials in their standard state (at 25 °C [77 °F], 100 kPa). verify (what is ?) Infobox references

Caesium hydride or cesium hydride is an inorganic compound of caesium and hydrogen with the chemical formula CsH. It is an alkali metal hydride. It was the first substance to be created by light-induced particle formation in metal vapor, and showed promise in early studies of an ion propulsion system using caesium. It is the most reactive stable alkaline metal hydride. It is a powerful superbase and reacts with water extremely vigorously.

The caesium nucleus in CsH can be hyperpolarized through interactions with an optically pumped caesium vapor in a process known as spin-exchange optical pumping (SEOP). SEOP can increase the nuclear magnetic resonance (NMR) signal of caesium nucleus by an order of magnitude.

It is very difficult to make caesium hydride in a pure form. Caesium hydride can be produced by heating caesium carbonate and metallic magnesium in hydrogen at 580 to 620 °C (1,076 to 1,148 °F).

== Crystal structure ==
At room temperature and atmospheric pressure, CsH has the same structure as NaCl.
