= Rubidium hydride =

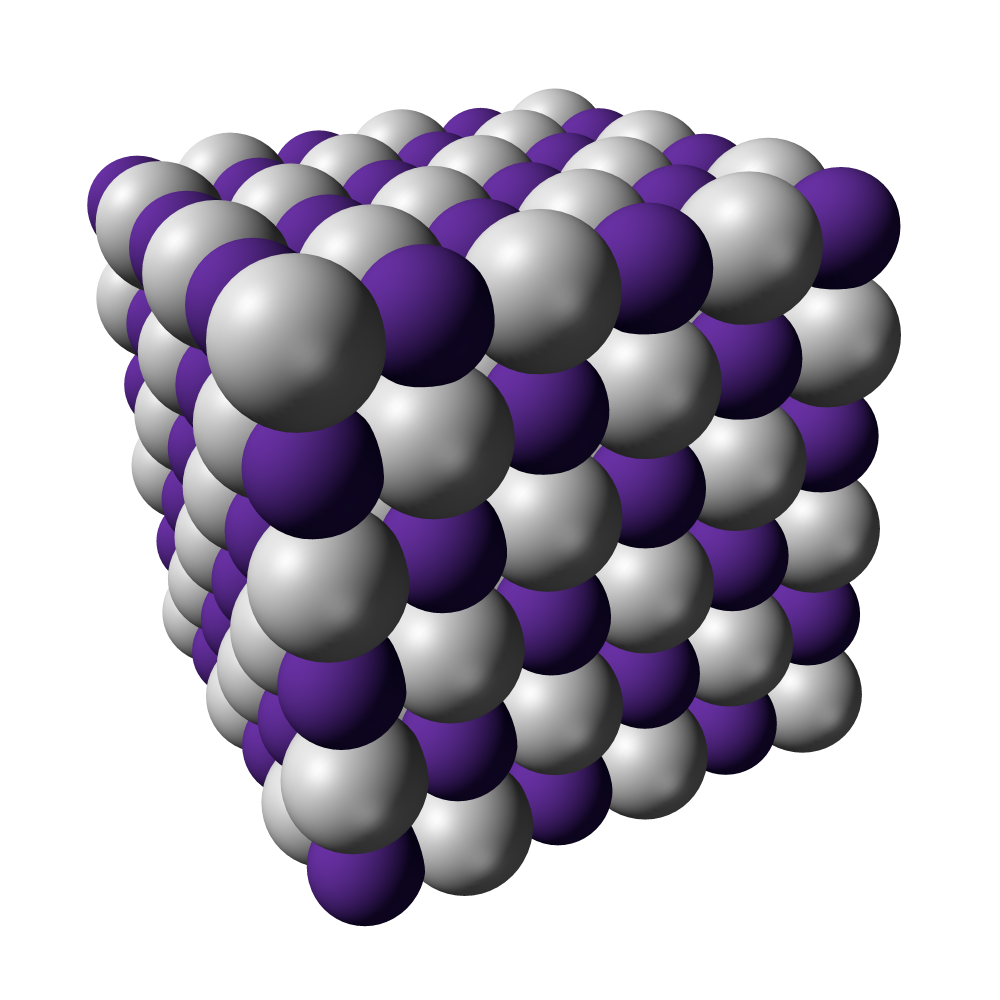
- Rubidium cation, Rb^{+} Hydrogen anion, H^{−}

Names
- IUPAC name Rubidium hydride
- Other names Rubidium(I) hydride

Identifiers
CAS Number	13446-75-8
3D model (JSmol)	Interactive image
PubChem CID	171411
CompTox Dashboard (EPA)	DTXSID10276613
- InChI: InChI=1S/Rb.H/q+1;-1
- SMILES: [H-].[Rb+]

Properties
Chemical formula	RbH
Molar mass	86.476 g/mol
Appearance	white cubic crystals
Density	2.60 g/cm^{3}
Melting point	Decomposes at 170°C
Solubility in water	reacts

Structure
Crystal structure	cubic, cF8
Space group	Fm3̅m, No. 225

Thermochemistry
Std enthalpy of formation (Δ_{f}H^{⦵}_{298})	−52.3 kJ/mol

Related compounds
Other anions	Rubidium oxide Rubidium chloride
Other cations	Lithium hydride Sodium hydride Potassium hydride Caesium hydride
- Except where otherwise noted, data are given for materials in their standard state (at 25 °C [77 °F], 100 kPa). verify (what is ?) Infobox references

Rubidium hydride is the hydride of rubidium. With the formula RbH, it is classified as an alkali metal hydride. It is a white solid and is insoluble in most solvents. It is synthesized by treating rubidium metal with hydrogen. Rubidium hydride is a powerful superbase and reacts violently with water.
