= ADZ =

An adz is a woodworking tool.

Adz or ADZ may also refer to:

- Adamanzane, a nitrogen compound
- Adzera language
- The Age of Adz, an album by Sufjan Stevens
- Allgemeine Deutsche Zeitung für Rumänien, a German-language Romanian newspaper
- Amiga Disk File
- Gustavo Rojas Pinilla International Airport in San Andrés, Department of San Andrés and Providencia, Colombia (IATA airport code ADZ)
