= Cryptand =

Cyclic, multidentate ligands adept at encapsulating cations

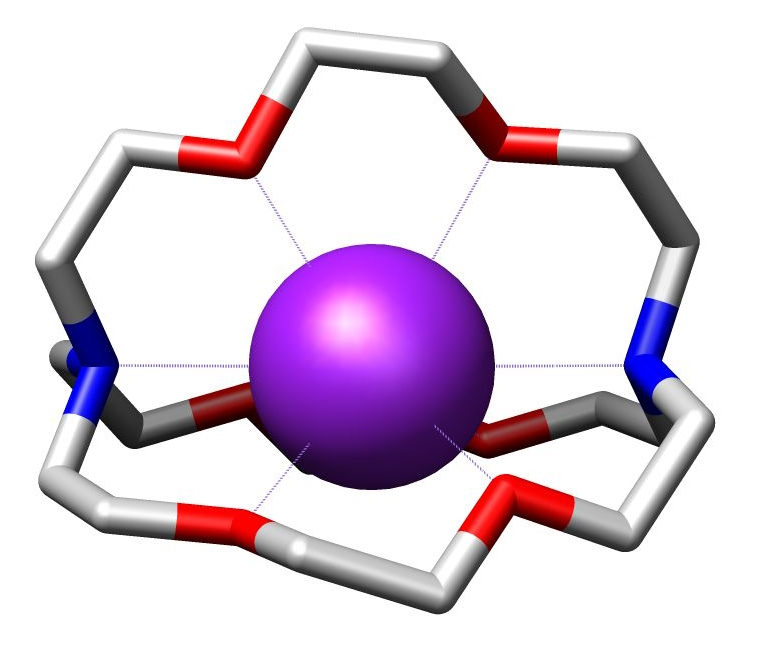
Structure of [2.2.2]cryptand encapsulating a potassium cation (purple). At crystalline state, obtained with an X-ray diffraction.

[2.2.2]Cryptand

In chemistry, cryptands are a family of synthetic, bicyclic and polycyclic, multidentate ligands for a variety of cations. The Nobel Prize for Chemistry in 1987 was given to Donald J. Cram, Jean-Marie Lehn, and Charles J. Pedersen for their efforts in discovering and determining uses of cryptands and crown ethers, thus launching the now flourishing field of supramolecular chemistry. The term cryptand implies that this ligand binds substrates in a crypt, interring the guest as in a burial. These molecules are three-dimensional analogues of crown ethers but are more selective and strong as complexes for the guest ions. The resulting complexes are lipophilic.

== Structure ==
The most common and most important cryptand is [2.2.2]cryptand. The numbers indicate the number of ether oxygen atoms (and hence binding sites) in each of the three bridges between the amine nitrogen caps. Many cryptands are commercially available under the tradename Kryptofix. All-amine cryptands exhibit particularly high affinity for alkali metal cations, which has allowed the isolation of salts of K^{−}.

== Properties ==
=== Cation binding ===
The three-dimensional interior cavity of a cryptand provides a binding site – or host – for "guest" ions. The complex between the cationic guest and the cryptand is called a cryptate. Cryptands form complexes with many "hard cations" including NH^{+}_{4}, lanthanoids, alkali metals, and alkaline earth metals. In contrast to crown ethers, cryptands bind the guest ions using both nitrogen and oxygen donors. This three-dimensional encapsulation mode confers some size-selectivity, enabling discrimination among alkali metal cations (e.g. Na^{+} vs. K^{+}). Some cryptands are luminescent.

=== Anion binding ===
Polyamine-based cryptands can be converted to polyammonium cages, which exhibit high affinities for anions.

== Laboratory uses ==
Cryptands enjoy some commercial applications (e.g. in homogenous-time-resolved-fluorescence, HTRF, technologies using Eu^{3+} as central ion). More importantly, they are reagents for the synthesis of inorganic and organometallic salts. Although more expensive and more difficult to prepare than crown ethers, cryptands bind alkali metals more strongly. They are especially used to isolate salts of highly basic anions. They convert solvated alkali metal cations into lipophilic cations, thereby conferring solubility in organic solvents to the resulting salts.

Referring to achievements that have been recognized in textbooks, cryptands enabled the synthesis of the alkalides and electrides. For example, addition of [2.2.2]cryptand to a solution of sodium in ammonia affords the salt [Na(2,2,2-crypt)]^{+}e^{−}, isolated a blue-black paramagnetic solid. Cryptands have also been used in the crystallization of Zintl ions such as Sn^{4−}_{9}.

Although rarely practical, cryptands can serve as phase transfer catalysts since their cationic complexes are lipophilic.

== See also ==
- Tris(2-(2-methoxyethoxy)ethyl)amine, an acyclic amine-polyether ligand that is less expensive than cryptands
- Clathrate, a compound that encapsulates ions or molecules
- Clathrochelate, a ligand that encapsulated metal ions
- Cryptophane, a family of organic compounds that encapsulates other molecules
- Cyclodextrin, a family of organic compounds consists of ring of glucose subunits, also used for host-guest chemistry

== General reading ==
- IUPAC, Compendium of Chemical Terminology, 5th ed. (the "Gold Book") (2025). Online version: (2006–) "cryptand". doi:10.1351/goldbook.C01426
- Lee, J.D. (1991). Concise Inorganic Chemistry (4th ed.). New York: Chapman & Hall. pp. 306–308 & 353. ISBN 0-412-40290-4.
- Krakowiak, K. E.; Bradshaw, J. S.; An, H.-Y.; Izatt, R. M. (1993). "Simple methods for the preparation of cryptands". Pure Appl. Chem. 65 (3): 511–514. doi:10.1351/pac199365030511.
