= L-selectride =

Names
- IUPAC name lithium tri-sec-butyl(hydrido)borate(1-)

Identifiers
CAS Number	38721-52-7
3D model (JSmol)	Interactive image
ChemSpider	2006164
ECHA InfoCard	100.049.166
EC Number	254-101-1
PubChem CID	2723989
UNII	J471N7T23N
CompTox Dashboard (EPA)	DTXSID70959536
- InChI: InChI=1S/C12H28B.Li/c1-7-10(4)13(11(5)8-2)12(6)9-3;/h10-13H,7-9H2,1-6H3;/q-1;+1 Key: ACJKNTZKEFMEAK-UHFFFAOYSA-N; InChI=1/C12H28B.Li/c1-7-10(4)13(11(5)8-2)12(6)9-3;/h10-13H,7-9H2,1-6H3;/q-1;+1 Key: ACJKNTZKEFMEAK-UHFFFAOYAI
- SMILES: [Li+].CCC(C)[BH-](C(C)CC)C(C)CC

Properties
Chemical formula	C_{12}H_{28}BLi
Molar mass	190.10 g/mol
Appearance	Colorless liquid
Density	0.870 g/ml
Solubility in water	Reacts with water

Hazards
- Occupational safety and health (OHS/OSH)
Main hazards	Water reactive, flammable, burns skin and eyes
Flash point	-17 °F
- Except where otherwise noted, data are given for materials in their standard state (at 25 °C [77 °F], 100 kPa). verify (what is ?) Infobox references

L-selectride is a organoboron compound with the chemical formula Li[(CH_{3}CH_{2}CH(CH_{3}))_{3}BH]. A colorless salt, it is usually dispensed as a solution in THF. As a particularly basic and bulky borohydride, it is used for stereoselective reduction of ketones to alcohols.

== Use in synthesis ==
Like other borohydrides, reductions are effected in two steps: delivery of the hydride equivalent to give the lithium alkoxide followed by hydrolytic workup:

R_{2}CO + Li[(CH_{3}CH_{2}CH(CH_{3}))_{3}BH] → R_{2}CHOLi + (CH_{3}CH_{2}CH(CH_{3}))_{3}B
R_{2}CHOLi + H_{2}O → R_{2}CH_{2}OH + LiOH

The selectivity of this reagent is illustrated by its reduction of all three methylcyclohexanones to the less stable methylcyclohexanols in >98% yield.

Under certain conditions, L-selectride can selectively reduce enones by conjugate addition of hydride, owing to the greater steric hindrance the bulky hydride reagent experiences at the carbonyl carbon relative to the (also-electrophilic) β-position. L-Selectride can also stereoselectively reduce carbonyl groups in a 1,2-fashion, again due to the steric nature of the hydride reagent.

== Related compounds ==
N-selectride and K-selectride are related compounds, but instead of lithium as cation they have sodium and potassium cations respectively. These reagents can sometimes be used as alternatives to, for instance, sodium amalgam reductions in inorganic chemistry.

== Related compounds ==
- Lithium Trisiamylborohydride
- Lithium triethylborohydride ("Super hydride")
