= Sodium triethylborohydride =

Identifiers
CAS Number	17979-81-6
3D model (JSmol)	Interactive image
ChemSpider	2006279
ECHA InfoCard	100.038.079
EC Number	241-903-1
PubChem CID	23667700
- InChI: InChI=1S/C6H15B.Na/c1-4-7(5-2)6-3;/h4-6H2,1-3H3;/q-1;+1 Key: UKYGKELSBAWRAN-UHFFFAOYSA-N
- SMILES: [B-](CC)(CC)CC.[Na+]

Properties
Chemical formula	C_{6}H_{16}BNa
Molar mass	121.99
Appearance	white solid
Melting point	30 °C

Hazards
- Occupational safety and health (OHS/OSH)
Main hazards	pyrophoric
- GHS labelling
Pictograms	(GHS02: Flammable) (GHS05: Corrosive)
Signal word	Danger
Hazard statements	H261, H314
Precautionary statements	P231+P232, P260, P264, P280, P301+P330+P331, P303+P361+P353, P304+P340, P305+P351+P338, P310, P321, P363, P370+P378, P402+P404, P405, P501
- Except where otherwise noted, data are given for materials in their standard state (at 25 °C [77 °F], 100 kPa). Infobox references

Sodium triethylborohydride is an organoboron compound with the formula NaBH(C_{2}H_{5})_{3}. It is a colorless, pyrophoric solid that is commercially available in toluene solution, unlike the related LiBH(C_{2}H_{5})_{3} which is typically sold as a THF solution. It is commonly used for the reductive activation of homogeneous catalysts, converting metal halides to hydrides. Sodium triethylborohydride has been prepared by treating a hot toluene slurry of sodium hydride with triethylborane. The trimethylborohydride analogue, which is assumed to be structurally similar to the triethylborohydride, adopts a tetrameric structure in toluene solution. NaBHEt_{3} forms a dimeric adduct with TMEDA.
