= Clathrochelate =

Ligands which encapsulate a metal ion in a chemical complex

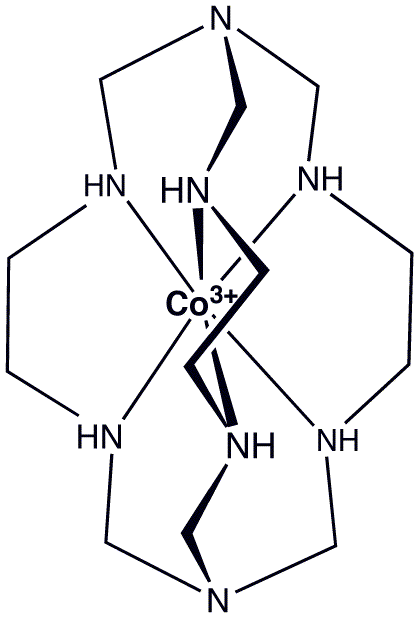
Structure of a clathrochelate complex, [Co(sepulchrate)]^{3+}.

In coordination chemistry, clathrochelates are ligands that encapsulate metal ions. Chelating ligands bind to metals more strongly than related monodentate ligands, and macrocyclic ligands bind more strongly than typical chelating ligands. It follows that bi- or polymacrocyclic ligands would bind to metals particularly strongly. Clathrochelates are usually derived from bimacrocyclic ligands.

The first examples were derived from the tris(dioximate)s of cobalt(III) and iron(II). The synthesis entails replacement of the hydrogen-bonded proton center with BF^{2+} or BOR^{2+} group:

[Fe(HON=CMeCMe=NOH)(ON=CMeCMe=NO)_{2}]^{2−} + 2 BF_{3} → Fe(ON=CMeCMe=NO)_{3}(BF)_{2} + 2 HF^{−}_{2}

Also well known are the clathrochelates called sepulchrates derived from tris(ethylenediamine)cobalt(III):

[Co(H_{2}NCH_{2}CH_{2}NH_{2})_{3}]^{3+} + 6 CH_{2}O + 2 NH_{3} → [Co[N(CH_{2}HNCH_{2}CH_{2}NHCH_{2})_{3}N]^{3+} + 6 H_{2}O

The insertion and removal of metals from the binding pocket of clathrochelates can be very slow. For this reason, many clathrochelates are prepared by the reactions of pre-coordinated ligands. These reactions often do not directly break any metal-ligand bonds, but occur in the second coordination sphere. The slowness of the metal ion exchange enables certain experiments that would otherwise be difficult or impossible. For example, it is possible to optically resolve the equivalent of [Co(H_{2}NCH_{2}CH_{2}NH_{2})_{3}]^{2+}. In the absence of the special geometry imposed by the clathrochelate, the lifetime of Co(II)-amine complexes is typically very short. In this way, this family of complexes enables studies on self-exchange redox reactions between Co(II) and Co(III) partners that would be impossible with simpler ligand systems.

== See also ==
- Cryptand
