= Zip fuel =

Fuels containing boranes for increased energy density

Zip fuel, also known as high energy fuel (HEF), is any member of a family of jet fuels containing additives in the form of hydro-boron compounds, or boranes. Zip fuels offer higher energy density than conventional fuels, helping extend the range of jet aircraft. In the 1950s, when the short range of jet aircraft was a major problem for military planners, zip fuels were a topic of significant study.

A number of aircraft were designed to make use of zip, including the XB-70 Valkyrie, XF-108 Rapier, as well as the BOMARC, and even the nuclear-powered aircraft program. The Navy considered converting all of their jet engines to zip and began studies of converting their aircraft carriers to safely store it.

In testing, the fuels proved to have several serious problems, and the entire effort was eventually cancelled in 1959.

== Description ==
The highest energy density fuel (by weight) in common propellant combinations is hydrogen. However, gaseous hydrogen has very low (volume) density; liquified hydrogen has higher density but is complex and expensive to store. When combined with carbon, hydrogen can be rendered into the easily burnable hydrocarbon fuels. Other elements, like aluminum and beryllium, have even higher energy content than carbon, but do not mix well to form a stable fuel that can be easily burned.

Of all the low-mass elements, boron has the combination of high energy, low weight and wide availability that makes it interesting as a potential fuel. Boranes have a high specific energy, about 70,000 kJ/kg (30,000 BTU/lb). This compares favorably to a typical kerosene-based fuel, such as JP-4 or RP-1, which provides about 42,000 kJ/kg (18,000 BTU/lb). They are not suitable for burning as a fuel on their own, however, because they are often prone to self-ignition in contact with air, making them dangerous to handle.

When mixed with conventional jet fuels, they add to the energy content while becoming somewhat more stable. In general terms, boron-enhanced fuels offer up to 40% higher energy density than plain JP-4 in terms of both weight and volume. In the US a whole family of fuels were investigated, and generally referred to by the names they were assigned during the Air Force's Project HEF: HEF-1 (ethyldiborane), HEF-2 (propylpentaborane), HEF-3 (ethyldecaborane), HEF-4 (methyldecaborane), and HEF-5 (ethylacetylenedecaborane).

Zip fuels have a number of disadvantages. For one, the fuel is toxic, as is its exhaust. This was of little concern in flight, but a major concern for ground crews servicing the aircraft. The fuels burn to create solids that are both sticky and corrosive, while boron carbide solids are abrasive. This caused serious problems for turbine blades in jet engines, where the exhaust built up on the blades and reduced their effectiveness and sometimes caused catastrophic failure of the engine. Finally, the exhaust plume is filled with particulates, as with coal smoke, allowing an aircraft to be spotted visually at long range.

In the end, the problem of burning HEF throughout the entire engine proved impossible to solve. Removing the buildup was difficult, and the wear it caused was something that materials science was unable to address. It was possible to burn it with relative ease in an afterburner, but this would only be effective on aircraft that used an afterburner for extended periods of time. Combined with the high cost of producing the fuel and the toxicity issues, the value of zip fuel was seriously reduced.

After interest in boranes as jet fuel waned, some small-scale research into their use as rocket fuel continued. This too proved to be a dead-end: the solid boron oxides in the combustion products interfered with the expected thermodynamics, and the thrust advantages could not be realized.

== History ==
Several studies were made into boronated fuels over the years, starting with the U.S. Army's rocket-related Project HERMES in the late 1940s, the U.S. Navy Bureau of Aeronautics's Project ZIP in 1952, and the U.S. Air Force's Project HEF (High Energy Fuels) in 1955. For much of the 1950s, zip fuels were considered to be the "next big thing" and considerable funds were expended on these projects in an effort to bring them into service. The Navy's name stuck, and all the boronated fuels became known as "zip fuels", although the Air Force's naming for the fuels themselves became common.

The main thrust of the Air Force's program was based on HEF-3, which seemed to be the most likely candidate for quick introduction. HEF became part of the WS-110 efforts to build a new long-range bomber to replace the B-52 Stratofortress with a design able to dash at speeds up to Mach 2. The initial designs from Boeing and North American Aviation (NAA) both used conventional fuels for takeoff and cruise, switching to HEF during the high-speed dash, burning it only in their afterburner sections. This avoided the main problems with HEF; by burning it only in the afterburners the problem with buildup on the turbine was eliminated, and since the afterburners were only used for takeoff and high-speed flight, the problems with the toxic exhaust were greatly reduced.

When the initial designs proved to be too expensive to justify their relatively small performance improvement, both returned to the drawing board and came up with new designs that flew at supersonic speeds for most of a combat mission. These designs were based around new engines designed for sustained high-speed flight, with the NAA B-70 Valkyrie and General Electric J93 progressing to the prototype stage. In these cases the afterburners were used for a longer period, maximizing the benefits of HEF. There were plans to introduce a later version of the J93 that would burn HEF-4 throughout. Meanwhile, there were also studies on using HEF-3 in the BOMARC ramjets, as well as studies about carrying it on the U.S. Navy's aircraft carrier fleet to power future aircraft, but these programs both died out.

As the problems were proving intractable, the Air Force canceled their program in 1959, and interest in zip essentially disappeared. By this point the only design still considering using HEF was the XB-70 and its J93. NAA and General Electric responded by redesigning the engine to run on a new higher-density form of jet fuel, JP-6, and filling one of the two bomb bays with a new fuel tank. In doing so the range was dramatically reduced from about 7,700 to 5,500 nautical miles (14,300 to 10,200 km). This reduced the selection of targets that could be attacked from the US and required in-flight refueling for every mission profile, one more problem that led to the project's eventual re-direction as a purely experimental aircraft.

It is estimated that the US spent about $1 billion on the program, in 2001 inflation-adjusted dollars. At least five HEF production plants were built in the US, and two workers were killed in an explosion that destroyed one plant in New York. Most of the program was classified Top Secret while being carried out, but nevertheless it was widely covered both in the trade press and civilian newspapers.

Both the US and Soviet Union independently declassified their research in 1964.

Zip fuel research led to the use of triethylborane as an ignition agent for the JP-7 fuel used in the SR-71 Blackbird.

One potentially lasting relic of the HEF program is an abandoned dirt airfield outside Boron, California. Marked on USGS topographical maps as "Air Force Plant #72", nothing but the airstrip and a water tank were ever built on the site. It is speculated that this would have been a factory for HEF fuel, using the large borax deposits nearby (giving the town its name), where it could be easily shipped to Edwards Air Force Base.

== Sources ==
- Clark, John Drury (1972). Ignition! : An Informal History of Liquid Rocket Propellants. Rutgers University Press. ISBN 978-0-8135-9919-9. OCLC 1125188610.
- J. R. Cracknell, "High Energy Fuels", Flight International, 15 March 1956, pg. 332–334
- Dequasie, Andrew (1992-04-01). The green flame: surviving government secrecy.
- M. Frederick Hawthorne, "From Mummies to Rockets and on to Cancer Therapy"
- Griswold, Wesley (October 1957). Super-Potent 'Zip' Fuels Pack More WHOOSH. Bonnier Corporation. pp. 86–89, 250.
- Dave Schubert, "From Missiles to Medicine: The development of boron hydrides", Pioneer, March 2001
- "Boron Air Force Plant #72 Airfield, Boron, CA"
