= Lithium hydride =

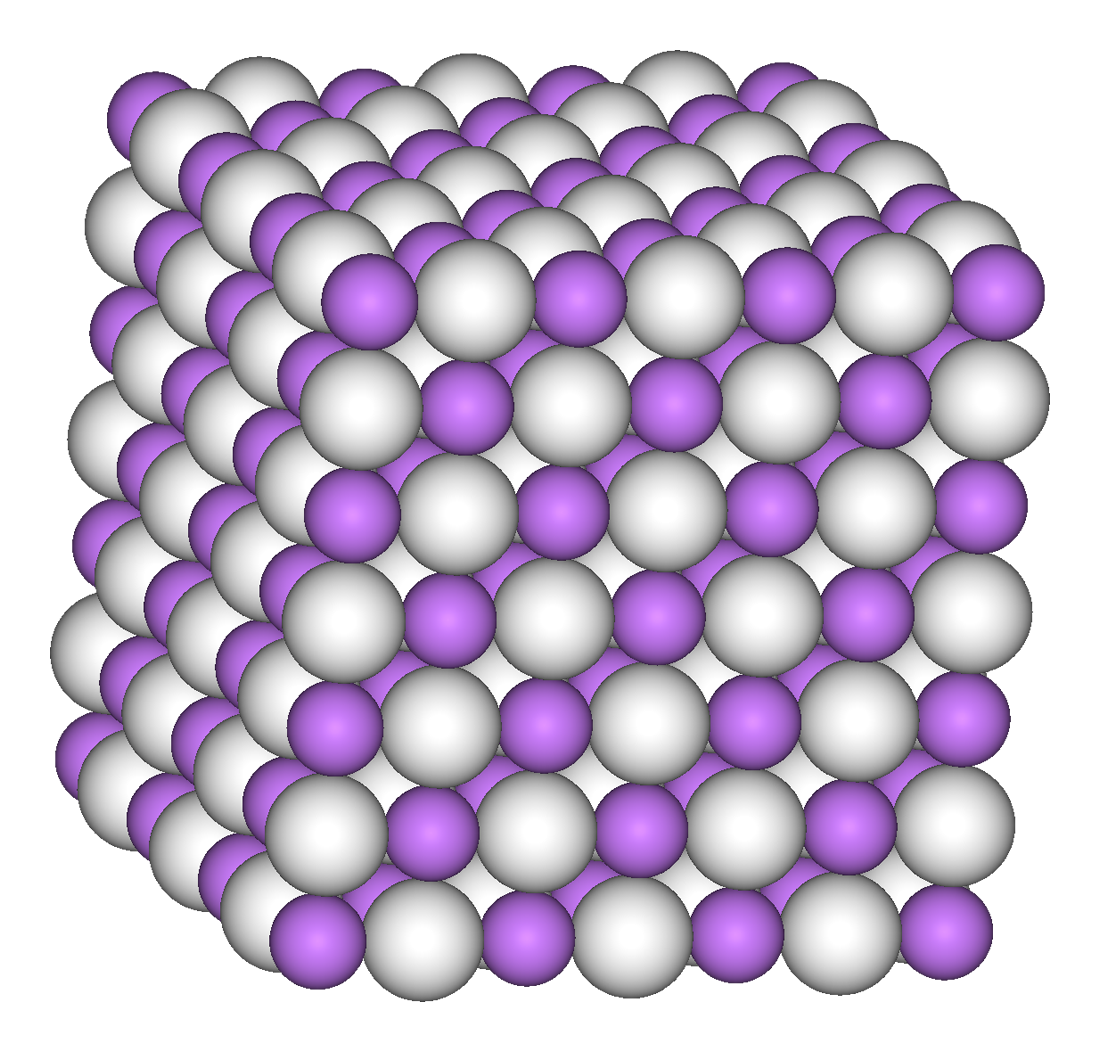
- Space-filling model of part of the crystal structure of lithium hydride Lithium cation, Li^{+} Hydrogen anion, H^{−}

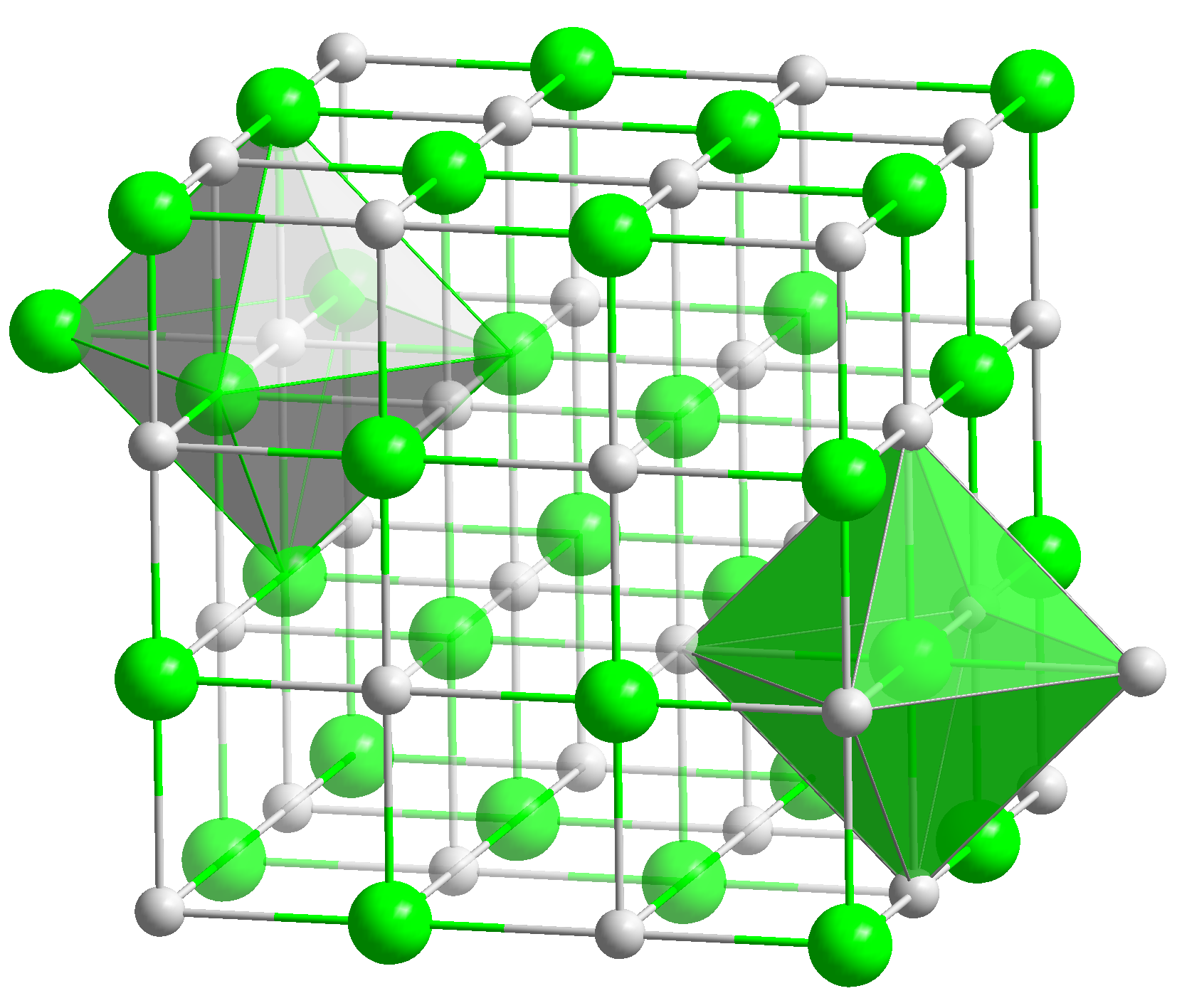
- __H^{−} __Li^{+} Structure of lithium hydride.

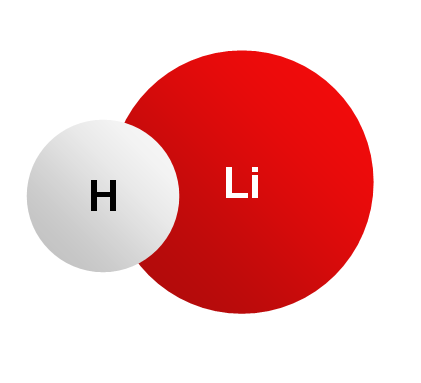
- Space-filling model of the lithium hydride molecule

Identifiers
CAS Number	7580-67-8
3D model (JSmol)	Interactive image
ChemSpider	56460
ECHA InfoCard	100.028.623
PubChem CID	62714
RTECS number	OJ6300000
UNII	68KF447EX3
CompTox Dashboard (EPA)	DTXSID80893078
- InChI: InChI=1S/Li.Hssss Key: SIAPCJWMELPYOE-UHFFFAOYSA-N; InChI=1/Li.H/q+1;-1 Key: SRTHRWZAMDZJOS-UHFFFAOYAZ
- SMILES: [H-].[Li+]

Properties
Chemical formula	LiH
Molar mass	7.95 g·mol^{−1}
Appearance	colorless to gray solid
Density	0.78 g/cm^{3}
Melting point	688.7 °C (1,271.7 °F; 961.9 K)
Boiling point	900–1,000 °C (1,650–1,830 °F; 1,170–1,270 K) (decomposes)
Solubility in water	reacts
Solubility	slightly soluble in dimethylformamide reacts with ammonia, diethyl ether, ethanol
Magnetic susceptibility (χ)	−4.6·10^{−6} cm^{3}/mol
Refractive index (n_{D})	1.9847

Structure
Crystal structure	fcc (NaCl-type)
Lattice constant	a = 0.40834 nm
Dipole moment	6.0 D

Thermochemistry
Heat capacity (C)	3.51 J/(g·K)
Std molar entropy (S^{⦵}_{298})	170.8 J/(mol·K)
Std enthalpy of formation (Δ_{f}H^{⦵}_{298})	−90.65 kJ/mol
Gibbs free energy (Δ_{f}G^{⦵})	−68.48 kJ/mol

Hazards
- Occupational safety and health (OHS/OSH)
Main hazards	extremely strong irritant, highly toxic, highly corrosive
- GHS labelling
Pictograms	(GHS02: Flammable) (GHS05: Corrosive) (GHS06: Toxic)
Signal word	Danger
Hazard statements	H260, H301, H314
Precautionary statements	P223, P231+P232, P260, P264, P270, P280, P301+P316, P301+P330+P331, P302+P335+P334, P302+P361+P354, P304+P340, P305+P354+P338, P316, P321, P330, P363, P370+P378, P402+P404, P405, P501
NFPA 704 (fire diamond)	3 2 2 W
Autoignition temperature	200 °C (392 °F; 473 K)
- Lethal dose or concentration (LD, LC)
LD_{50} (median dose)	77.5 mg/kg (oral, rat)
LC_{50} (median concentration)	22 mg/m^{3} (rat, 4 h)
- NIOSH (US health exposure limits)
PEL (Permissible)	TWA 0.025 mg/m^{3}
REL (Recommended)	TWA 0.025 mg/m^{3}
IDLH (Immediate danger)	0.5 mg/m^{3}
Safety data sheet (SDS)	ICSC 0813

Related compounds
Other cations	Sodium hydride Potassium hydride Rubidium hydride Caesium hydride
Related compounds	Lithium borohydride Lithium aluminium hydride
- Except where otherwise noted, data are given for materials in their standard state (at 25 °C [77 °F], 100 kPa). verify (what is ?) Infobox references

Lithium hydride (LiH) is an inorganic compound composed of lithium and hydrogen. This alkali metal hydride is a colorless solid, although commercial samples are grey. Characteristic of a salt-like (ionic) hydride, it has a high melting point, and it is not soluble but reactive with all protic organic solvents. It is soluble and nonreactive with certain molten salts such as lithium fluoride, lithium borohydride, and sodium hydride. With a molar mass of 7.95 g/mol, it is the lightest ionic compound.

== Physical properties ==
LiH is diamagnetic and an ionic conductor with an electric conductivity gradually increasing from 2×10^{−5} Ω^{−1}cm^{−1} at 443 °C to 0.18 Ω^{−1}cm^{−1} at 754 °C; there is no discontinuity in this increase through the melting point. The dielectric constant of LiH decreases from 13.0 (static, low frequencies) to 3.6 (visible-light frequencies). LiH is a soft material with a Mohs hardness of 3.5. Its compressive creep (per 100 hours) rapidly increases from < 1% at 350 °C to > 100% at 475 °C, meaning that LiH cannot provide mechanical support when heated.

The thermal conductivity of LiH decreases with temperature and depends on morphology: the corresponding values are 0.125 W/(cm·K) for crystals and 0.0695 W/(cm·K) for compacts at 50 °C, and 0.036 W/(cm·K) for crystals and 0.0432 W/(cm·K) for compacts at 500 °C. The linear thermal expansion coefficient is 4.2×10^{−5}/°C at room temperature.

== Synthesis and processing ==
LiH is produced by treating lithium metal with hydrogen gas:

2 Li + H_{2} → 2 LiH

This reaction is especially rapid at temperatures above 600 °C. Addition of 0.001–0.003% carbon, and/or increasing temperature/pressure, increases the yield up to 98% at 2-hour residence time. However, the reaction proceeds at temperatures as low as 29 °C. The yield is 60% at 99 °C and 85% at 125 °C, and the rate depends significantly on the surface condition of LiH.

Less common ways of LiH synthesis include thermal decomposition of lithium aluminium hydride (200 °C), lithium borohydride (300 °C), n-butyllithium (150 °C), or ethyllithium (120 °C), as well as several reactions involving lithium compounds of low stability and available hydrogen content.

Chemical reactions yield LiH in the form of lumped powder, which can be compressed into pellets without a binder. More complex shapes can be produced by casting from the melt. Large single crystals (about 80 mm long and 16 mm in diameter) can be then grown from molten LiH powder in hydrogen atmosphere by the Bridgman–Stockbarger technique. They often have bluish color owing to the presence of colloidal Li. This color can be removed by post-growth annealing at lower temperatures (~550 °C) and lower thermal gradients. Major impurities in these crystals are Na (20–200 ppm), O (10–100 ppm), Mg (0.5–6 ppm), Fe (0.5-2 ppm) and Cu (0.5-2 ppm).

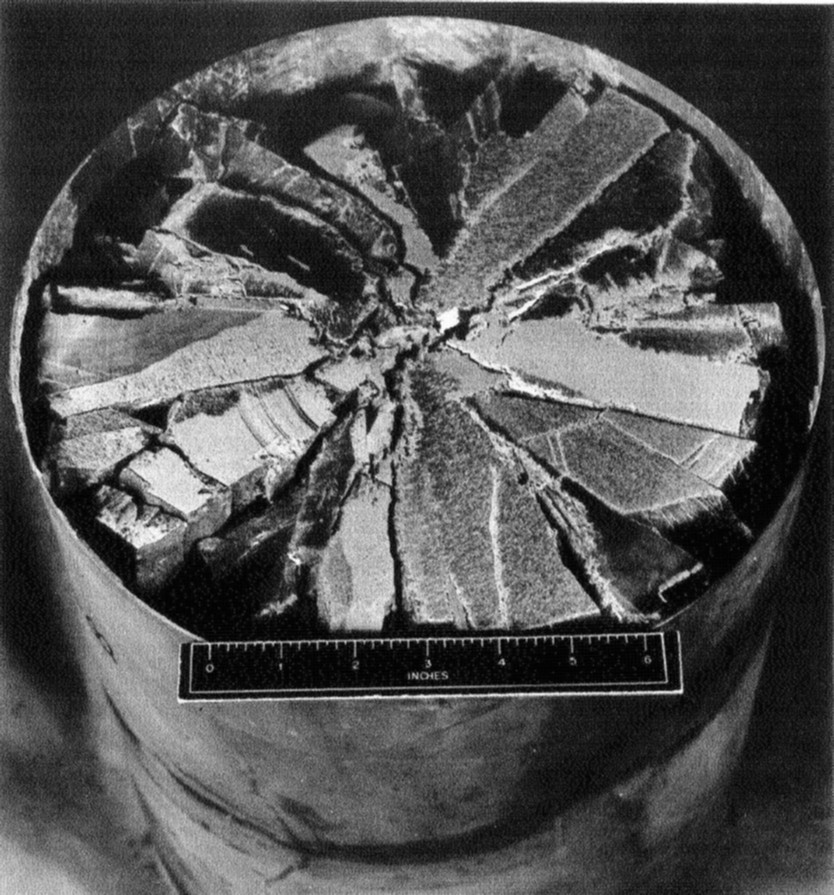
Cracking in cast LiH after machining with a fly cutter. Scale is in inches.

Bulk cold-pressed LiH parts can be easily machined using standard techniques and tools to micrometer precision. However, cast LiH is brittle and easily cracks during processing.

A more energy efficient route to form lithium hydride powder is by ball milling lithium metal under high hydrogen pressure. To prevent cold welding of lithium metal (due to its high ductility), small amounts of lithium hydride powder are added during this process.

== Reactions ==
LiH powder reacts rapidly with air of low humidity, forming LiOH, Li_{2}O and Li_{2}CO_{3}. In moist air the powder ignites spontaneously, forming a mixture of products including some nitrogenous compounds. The lump material reacts with humid air, forming a superficial coating, which is a viscous fluid. This inhibits further reaction, although the appearance of a film of "tarnish" is quite evident. Little or no nitride is formed on exposure to humid air. The lump material, contained in a metal dish, may be heated in air to slightly below 200 °C without igniting, although it ignites readily when touched by an open flame. The surface condition of LiH, presence of oxides on the metal dish, etc., have a considerable effect on the ignition temperature. Dry oxygen does not react with crystalline LiH unless heated strongly, when an almost explosive combustion occurs.

LiH is highly reactive towards water and other protic reagents:

LiH + H_{2}O → Li^{+} + H_{2} + OH^{−}

LiH is less reactive with water than Li and thus is a much less powerful reducing agent for water, alcohols, and other media containing reducible solutes. This is true for all the binary saline hydrides.

LiH pellets slowly expand in moist air, forming LiOH; however, the expansion rate is below 10% within 24 hours in a pressure of 2 Torr of water vapor. If moist air contains carbon dioxide, then the product is lithium carbonate. LiH reacts with ammonia, slowly at room temperature, but the reaction accelerates significantly above 300 °C. LiH reacts slowly with higher alcohols and phenols, but vigorously with lower alcohols.

LiH reacts with sulfur dioxide to give the dithionite:

2 LiH + 2 SO_{2} → Li_{2}S_{2}O_{4} + H_{2}

though above 50 °C the product is lithium sulfide instead.

LiH reacts with acetylene to form lithium carbide and hydrogen. With anhydrous organic acids, phenols and acid anhydrides, LiH reacts slowly, producing hydrogen gas and the lithium salt of the acid. With water-containing acids, LiH reacts faster than with water. Many reactions of LiH with oxygen-containing species yield LiOH, which in turn irreversibly reacts with LiH at temperatures above 300 °C:

LiH + LiOH → Li_{2}O + H_{2}

Lithium hydride is rather unreactive at moderate temperatures with O_{2} or Cl_{2}. It is, therefore, used in the synthesis of other useful hydrides, e.g.,

8 LiH + Al_{2}Cl_{6} → 2 Li[AlH_{4}] + 6 LiCl
2 LiH + B_{2}H_{6} → 2 Li[BH_{4}]

== Applications ==
=== Hydrogen storage and fuel ===
With a hydrogen content in proportion to its mass three times that of NaH, LiH has the highest hydrogen content of any hydride. LiH is periodically of interest for hydrogen storage, but applications have been thwarted by its stability to decomposition. Thus removal of H_{2} requires temperatures above the 700 °C used for its synthesis, such temperatures are expensive to create and maintain. The compound was once tested as a fuel component in a model rocket.

=== Precursor to complex metal hydrides ===
LiH is not usually a hydride-reducing agent, except in the synthesis of hydrides of certain metalloids. For example, silane is produced in the reaction of lithium hydride and silicon tetrachloride by the Sundermeyer process:

4 LiH + SiCl_{4} → 4 LiCl + SiH_{4}

Lithium hydride is used in the production of a variety of reagents for organic synthesis, such as lithium aluminium hydride (Li[AlH_{4}]) and lithium borohydride (Li[BH_{4}]). Triethylborane reacts to give superhydride (Li[BH(CH_{2}CH_{3})_{3}]).

=== In nuclear chemistry and physics ===
Lithium hydride (LiH) is sometimes a desirable material for the shielding of nuclear reactors, with the isotope lithium-6 (Li-6), and it can be fabricated by casting.

==== Moderator ====
Lithium deuteride, in the form of lithium-7 deuteride (^{7}Li^{2}H or ^{7}LiD), is a good moderator for nuclear reactors, because deuterium (^{2}H or D) has a lower neutron absorption cross-section than ordinary hydrogen or protium (^{1}H) does, and the cross-section for ^{7}Li is also low, decreasing the absorption of neutrons in a reactor. ^{7}Li is preferred for a moderator because it has a lower neutron capture cross-section, and it also forms less tritium (^{3}H or T) under bombardment with neutrons.

==== Thermonuclear weapons ====
Lithium deuteride (LiD), specifically with the rare isotope ^{6}_{3}Li, but also with the more common isotope of ^{7}_{3}Li, is the primary nuclear fusion fuel in both thermonuclear weapons and in boosted fission weapons of the "Sloika" type. In both designs, a nuclear fission trigger explodes to heat and compress lithium deuteride, while bombarding it with neutrons to produce tritium in an exothermic reaction:

^{6}_{3}Li + ^{1}_{0}n → ^{4}_{2}He + ^{3}_{1}H

The common ^{7}_{3}Li isotope also can undergo a tritium and neutron-producing reaction under the influence of high energy neutrons:

^{7}_{3}Li + ^{1}_{0}n → ^{4}_{2}He + ^{3}_{1}H + ^{1}_{0}n

Both reactions leave the deuterium (^{2}_{1}H) from the LiD capable of undergoing fusion with the tritium that has just been produced:

^{2}_{1}H + ^{3}_{1}H → ^{4}_{2}He + n (14.1 MeV)

The high-energy neutron produced by the deuterium-tritium reaction can then go on to react with more LiD, or go on to induce nuclear fission in fissionable materials (which can include uranium-238 in this context, because the fusion neutron is of sufficiently high energy), which can produce more neutrons, to continue the process. The maximum explosive yield of lithium deuteride fusion is around 50 kilotons per kilogram of material reacted, making it about 3 times more energy dense than nuclear fission.

Using lithium deuteride as a thermonuclear fuel source simplifies thermonuclear weapons design over attempts to use pure deuterium (which must be kept cryogenically cold to stay in a liquid form, as was done as part of the Ivy Mike experiment in 1952), or to produce large amounts of gaseous tritium, which is prohibitively expensive. Lithium deuteride allows the tritium to be formed in situ as part of the reaction. The ignition and burn rate of LiD is much higher than pure deuterium, and the burn time is shorter than a pure deuterium-tritium reaction, and it requires a strong source of neutrons to sustain the tritium production cycle. It is also necessarily heavier than pure deuterium. But the practical advantages outweigh these deficits.

Before the Castle Bravo nuclear weapons test in 1954, it was thought that only the less common isotope ^{6}_{3}Li would breed tritium when struck with fast neutrons. The Castle Bravo test showed (accidentally) that the more plentiful ^{7}_{3}Li also does so in significant quantities under the extreme conditions of an exploding thermonuclear weapon, and the test yield was 2.5 times larger than predicted as a result of this additional tritium production. Prior to this test, it was thought that when struck by a neutron, ^{7}_{3}Li would decay (via ^{8}_{4}Be) into a pair of alpha particles on a time scale of around a second, much too slow to participate in the detonation.

== Safety ==
LiH reacts violently with water to give hydrogen gas and LiOH, which is caustic. Consequently, LiH dust can explode in humid air, or even in dry air due to static electricity. At concentrations of 5–55 mg/m^{3} in air the dust is extremely irritating to the mucous membranes and skin and may cause an allergic reaction. Because of the irritation, LiH is normally rejected rather than accumulated by the body.

Some lithium salts, which can be produced in LiH reactions, are toxic. LiH fire should not be extinguished using carbon dioxide, carbon tetrachloride, or aqueous fire extinguishers; it should be smothered by covering with a metal object or graphite or dolomite powder. Sand is less suitable, as it can explode when mixed with burning LiH, especially if not dry. LiH is normally transported in oil, using containers made of ceramic, certain plastics or steel, and is handled in an atmosphere of dry argon or helium. Whilst nitrogen can be used, it will react with lithium at elevated temperatures. LiH normally contains some metallic lithium, which corrodes steel or silica containers at elevated temperatures.
