= Carbohydride =

Class of chemical compounds

Carbohydrides (or carbide hydrides) are solid compounds in one phase composed of a metal with carbon and hydrogen in the form of carbide and hydride ions. The term carbohydride can also refer to a hydrocarbon.

== Structure and bonding ==
Many of the transition metal carbohydrides are non-stochiometric, particularly with respect to the hydrogen that can vary in proportion up to a theoretical balanced proportion. The hydrogen and carbon occupy holes in the metal crystalline lattice. The carbon takes up octahedral sites (surrounded by six metal atoms) and the hydrogen takes up tetrahedral sites in the metal lattice. The hydrogen atoms go to sites away from the carbon atoms, and away from each other, at least 2 Å apart, so there are no covalent bonds between the carbon or hydrogen atoms. Overall the lattice retains a high symmetry of the original metal.

== Nomenclature ==
A carbodeuteride (or carbo-deuteride) is a compound where the hydrogen is of the isotope deuterium.

== Properties ==
=== Reactions ===
Metal carbide hydrides give off hydrogen when heated, and are in equilibrium with a partial pressure of hydrogen that depends on the temperature.

When Ca_{2}LiC_{3}H is heated with ammonium chloride, the gas C_{3}H_{4} (methylacetylene-propadiene) is produced.

== Ligand ==
There are also metal cluster molecules and ions that contain both carbon and hydrogen. Methylidyne (or carbyne) complexes contain the CH group with three bonds to a metal e.g. NiCH^{+} or PtCH^{+}. complexes also involve Sc, W, and Os.

== Natural occurrence ==
Iron carbide hydrides do not appear to be stable at the conditions present in the Earth's inner core, even though carbon or hydrogen have been proposed as alloying light elements in the core.

== Applications ==
Carbohydrides are studied for their ability in hydrogen storage. Carbohydrides may be made when carbides are manufactured by milling, using hydrocarbons as a carbon source. Since the carbohydride is not the desired outcome, other material like graphite is added to try to maximise carbide production.

== Preparation ==
Transition metal carbohydrides can be produced by heating a metal carbide in hydrogen, for example at 2000 °C and 3 bars. This reaction is exothermic, and just needs to be ignited at a much lower temperature. The process is called self-propagating high-temperature synthesis or SHS. A hydrocarbide may be formed when the metal is milled in a hydrocarbon, for example in the manufacture of titanium carbide.

Rare earth carbohydrides can be prepared by heating a metal hydride with graphite in a closed metal container, with a hydrogen atmosphere.

== List ==
| Name | formula | form | space group | unit cell | appearance | density | structure | ref |
| Lithium dicalcium tricarbide hydride | Ca_{2}LiC_{3}H | tetragonal | P4/mbm | a=6.8236 c=3.7518 Z=2 | silver | 2.36 | has C_{3}^{4−} | |
| Titanium carbo-deuteride | TiC_{0.48}D_{0.60} | cubic | Fm3m | a=4.30963 | | | | |
| Titanium carbo-deuteride | TiC_{0.48}D_{0.60} | trigonal | Fm3_{1} | a=3.08208 c=5.0405 | | | | |
| Zirconium carbohydride | ZrC_{0.3}H | | | | | | | |
| Hafnium carbohydride | Hf_{2}CH_{2} | | | a=3.427 c=5.476 | | | | |
| thorium carbohydride | ThCH_{2} | is cubic under 380°, and above is hexagonal. | | | | | | |
| | Th_{2}CH_{2} | hexagonal | | a=3.083 c=5.042 | | | | |
| | Th_{3}CH_{4} | monoclinic | | | | | | |
| Niobium carbohydride | NbC_{0.76}H_{0.18} | | | | | | | |
| Barium indium allenylide hydride | Ba_{12}InC_{18}H_{4} | cubic | Im3̅ | a=11.1447 | | | InBa_{12} icosahedrons | |
| | Y_{5}Si_{3}C_{0.5}H_{7.33} | | | | | | | |
| | La_{2}C_{3}H_{1.5} | | | | | | | |
| | La_{2}CH_{4} | | | a=5.642 | | | | |
| | La_{2}CH_{2} | monoclinic | C2/m | a = 7.206, b = 3.932, c = 6.739, β = 94.66 ° | | | | |
| | La_{15}(FeC_{6})_{4}H | hexagonal | P6̅ | a=8.7764 c=10.7355 Z=1 V=720.42 | silver | | | |
| | NdScSiC_{0.5}H_{0.2} | tetragonal | I4/mmm | | | | | |
| Ytterbium carbide hydride | Yb_{2}CH_{2} | hexgonal | | a=3.575 c=5.786 | | | | |
| Ytterbium dicarbide hydride | Yb_{2}C_{2}H | cubic | | a=4.974 | | | fcc | |
| | Pr_{3}Fe_{27.5}Ti_{1.5}C_{x}H | monoclinic | A2/m | | | | | |
| | Dy_{2}Co_{17}C_{0.2}H_{2.8} | | P6_{3}/mmc | a=8.418 c=8.165 V=501.1 | | | | |
| | Dy_{2}Ni_{17}C_{0.4}H_{2.7} | | P6_{3}/mmc | a=8.3789 c=8.054 V=489.7 | | | | |
| | Gd_{2}ICH | | P6_{3}/mmc | a = 3.8128 c = 14.844 | grey | 8.071 | | |
| | Gd_{2}BrCH | | P6_{3}/mmc | | grey | | | |
| | Gd_{2}ClCH | | P6_{3}/mmc | | grey | | | |
| | Tb_{2}ICH | | P6_{3}/mmc | | grey | | | |
| | Tb_{2}BrCH | | P6_{3}/mmc | | grey | | | |
