= Potassium hydride =

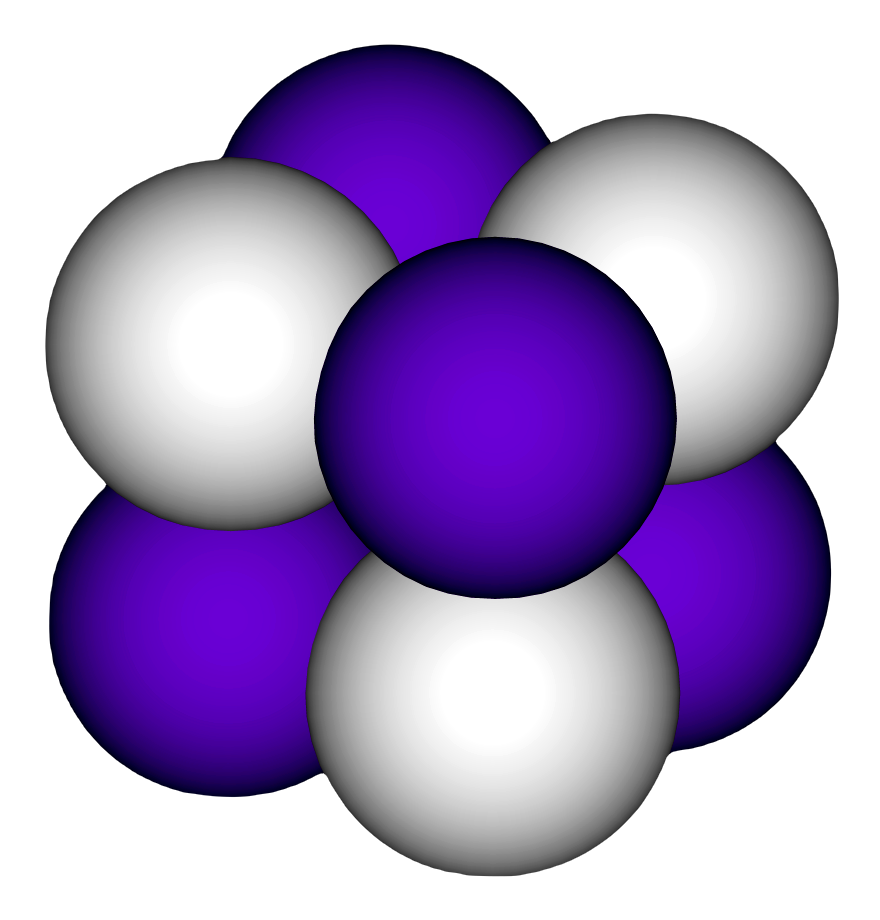
- Potassium cation, K^{+} Hydrogen anion, H^{−}

Names
- IUPAC name Potassium hydride

Identifiers
CAS Number	7693-26-7
3D model (JSmol)	Interactive image
ChemSpider	74121
ECHA InfoCard	100.028.823
EC Number	231-704-8
PubChem CID	82127
CompTox Dashboard (EPA)	DTXSID10894770
- InChI: InChI=1S/K.H/q+1;-1 Key: OCFVSFVLVRNXFJ-UHFFFAOYSA-N; InChI=1S/K.H/q+1;-1 Key: OCFVSFVLVRNXFJ-UHFFFAOYAO; Key: OCFVSFVLVRNXFJ-UHFFFAOYSA-N
- SMILES: [H-].[K+]

Properties
Chemical formula	KH
Molar mass	40.1062 g/mol
Appearance	white to gray crystalline powder
Density	1.43 g/cm^{3}
Melting point	decomposes at ~400 °C
Solubility in water	reacts
Solubility	insoluble in benzene, diethyl ether, carbon disulfide

Structure
Crystal structure	cubic, cF8
Space group	Fm3̅m, No. 225

Thermochemistry
Heat capacity (C)	37.91 J/(mol⋅K)
Std enthalpy of formation (Δ_{f}H^{⦵}_{298})	−57.82 kJ/mol

Hazards
- Occupational safety and health (OHS/OSH)
Main hazards	corrosive, pyrophoric, reacts violently with acids and water
NFPA 704 (fire diamond)	3 3 2 W

Related compounds
Other cations	Lithium hydride Sodium hydride Rubidium hydride Caesium hydride
- Except where otherwise noted, data are given for materials in their standard state (at 25 °C [77 °F], 100 kPa). verify (what is ?) Infobox references

Potassium hydride, KH, is the inorganic compound of potassium and hydrogen. It is an alkali metal hydride. It is a white solid, although commercial samples appear gray. It is a powerful superbase that is useful in organic synthesis. It is sold commercially as a slurry (~35%) in mineral oil or sometimes paraffin wax to facilitate dispensing.

== Preparation ==
Potassium hydride is produced by direct combination of the metal and hydrogen at temperatures between 200 and 350 °C (473 and 623 K):

2 K + H_{2} → 2 KH

This reaction was discovered by Humphry Davy soon after his 1807 discovery of potassium, when he noted that the metal would vaporize in a current of hydrogen when heated just below its boiling point (which is 1,030.793 K (757.643 °C)).

Potassium hydride is soluble in fused hydroxides (such as molten sodium hydroxide) and salt mixtures, but not in organic solvents.

== Reactions ==
KH reacts with water according to the reaction:

KH + H_{2}O → KOH + H_{2}

As a superbase, potassium hydride is more basic than sodium hydride. It is used to deprotonate certain carbonyl compounds to give enolates. It also deprotonates amines to give the corresponding amides of the type KNHR and KNR_{2}.

== Safety ==
KH can be pyrophoric in air, react violently with acids, and can ignite upon contact with oxidants. As a suspension in mineral oil, KH is less dangerous.

== See also ==
- Sodium hydride
