= Sodium hydride =

Chemical compound

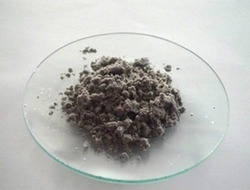
- Sodium hydride

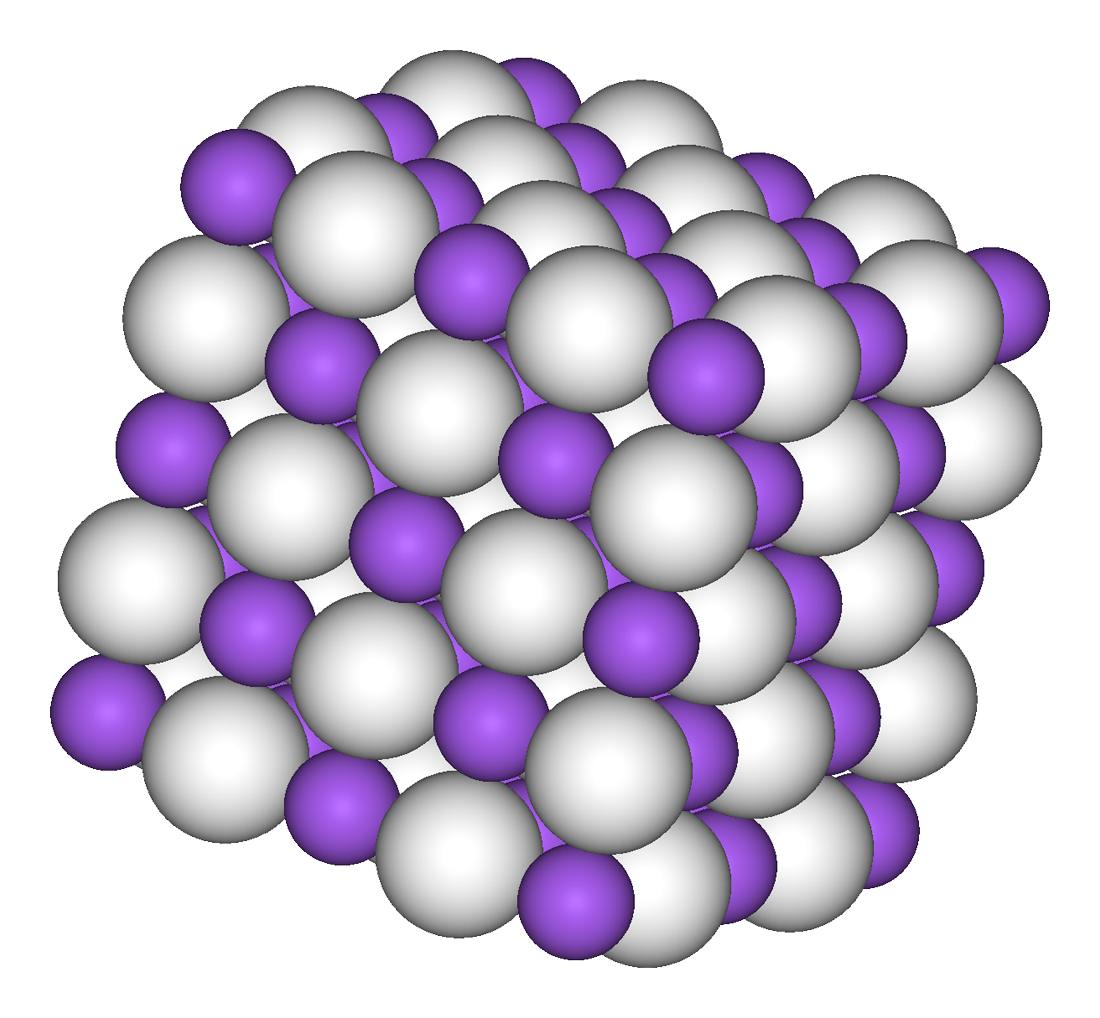
- Space-filling model of part of the crystal structure of sodium hydride Sodium cation, Na^{+} Hydrogen anion, H^{−}

Names
- IUPAC name Sodium hydride

Identifiers
CAS Number	7646-69-7
3D model (JSmol)	Interactive image
ChemSpider	23144
ECHA InfoCard	100.028.716
EC Number	231-587-3
PubChem CID	24758
UNII	23J3BHR95O
UN number	1427
CompTox Dashboard (EPA)	DTXSID90893680
- InChI: InChI=1S/Na.H Key: MPMYQQHEHYDOCL-UHFFFAOYSA-N; InChI=1/Na.H/q+1;-1 Key: BZKBCQXYZZXSCO-UHFFFAOYAY; InChI=1S/Na.H/q+1;-1 Key: BZKBCQXYZZXSCO-UHFFFAOYSA-N
- SMILES: [H-].[Na+]

Properties
Chemical formula	NaH
Molar mass	23.998 g·mol^{−1}
Appearance	white or grey solid
Density	1.39 g/cm^{3}
Melting point	425 °C (797 °F; 698 K) (decomposes)
Solubility in water	Reacts with water
Solubility	insoluble in all solvents
Band gap	3.51 eV (predicted)
Refractive index (n_{D})	1.470

Structure
Crystal structure	fcc (NaCl), cF8
Space group	Fm3̅m, No. 225
Lattice constant	a = 4.98 Å
Formula units (Z)	4
Coordination geometry	Octahedral (Na^{+}); Octahedral (H^{−})

Thermochemistry
Heat capacity (C)	36.4 J·mol^{-1}·K^{-1}
Std molar entropy (S^{⦵}_{298})	40.0 J·mol^{-1}·K^{-1}
Std enthalpy of formation (Δ_{f}H^{⦵}_{298})	−56.3 kJ⋅mol^{−1}
Gibbs free energy (Δ_{f}G^{⦵})	−33.5 kJ⋅mol^{−1}

Hazards
- Occupational safety and health (OHS/OSH)
Main hazards	highly corrosive, reacts violently with water or humid air.
- GHS labelling
Pictograms	(GHS02: Flammable) (GHS05: Corrosive)
Signal word	Danger
Hazard statements	H228, H260, H290, H314
Precautionary statements	P210, P223, P231+P232, P234, P240, P241, P260, P264, P280, P301+P330+P331, P302+P335+P334, P303+P361+P353, P304+P340+P310, P305+P351+P338+P310, P363, P370+P378, P390, P402+P404, P405, P501
NFPA 704 (fire diamond)	3 3 2 W
Flash point	185 °C (365 °F; 458 K) (closed cup)

Related compounds
Other anions	Sodium borohydride; Sodium hydroxide
Other cations	Lithium hydride; Potassium hydride; Rubidium hydride; Caesium hydride
- Except where otherwise noted, data are given for materials in their standard state (at 25 °C [77 °F], 100 kPa). verify (what is ?) Infobox references

Sodium hydride is the chemical compound with the empirical formula NaH. This alkali metal hydride is primarily used as a strong yet combustible base in organic synthesis. NaH is a saline (salt-like) hydride, composed of Na^{+} and H^{−} ions, in contrast to molecular hydrides such as borane, silane, germane, ammonia, and methane. It is an ionic material that is insoluble in all solvents (other than molten sodium metal), consistent with the fact that H^{−} ions do not exist in solution.

== Basic properties and structure ==
NaH is colorless, although samples generally appear grey. NaH is around 40% denser than Na (0.968 g/cm^{3}).

NaH, like LiH, KH, RbH, and CsH, adopts the NaCl crystal structure. In this motif, each Na^{+} ion is surrounded by six H^{−} centers in an octahedral geometry. The ionic radii of H^{−} (146 pm in NaH) and F^{−} (133 pm) are comparable, as judged by the Na−H and Na−F distances.

=== "Inverse sodium hydride" (hydrogen sodide) ===
A very unusual situation occurs in a compound dubbed "inverse sodium hydride", which contains H^{+} and Na^{−} ions. Na^{−} is an alkalide, and this compound differs from ordinary sodium hydride in having a much higher energy content due to the net displacement of two electrons from hydrogen to sodium. A derivative of this "inverse sodium hydride" arises in the presence of the base [3^{6}]adamanzane. This molecule irreversibly encapsulates the H^{+} and shields it from interaction with the alkalide Na^{−}. Theoretical work has suggested that even an unprotected protonated tertiary amine complexed with the sodium alkalide might be metastable under certain solvent conditions, though the barrier to reaction would be small and finding a suitable solvent might be difficult.

== Preparation ==
Industrially, NaH is prepared by introducing molten sodium into mineral oil with hydrogen at atmospheric pressure and mixed vigorously at ~8000 rpm. The reaction is especially rapid at 250–300 °C (482–572 °F).

2 Na + H_{2} → 2 NaH

The resultant suspension of NaH in mineral oil is often directly used, such as in the production of diborane.

== Applications in organic synthesis ==
=== As a strong base ===
NaH is a base of wide scope and utility in organic chemistry. As a superbase, it is capable of deprotonating a range of even weak Brønsted acids to give the corresponding sodium derivatives. Typical "easy" substrates contain O-H, N-H, S-H bonds, including alcohols, phenols, pyrazoles, and thiols.

NaH notably deprotonates carbon acids (i.e., C-H bonds) such as 1,3-dicarbonyls such as malonic esters. The resulting sodium derivatives can be alkylated. NaH is widely used to promote condensation reactions of carbonyl compounds via the Dieckmann condensation, Stobbe condensation, Darzens condensation, and Claisen condensation. Other carbon acids susceptible to deprotonation by NaH include sulfonium salts and DMSO. NaH is used to make sulfur ylides, which in turn are used to convert ketones into epoxides, as in the Johnson–Corey–Chaykovsky reaction.

=== As a reducing agent ===
NaH reduces certain main group compounds, but analogous reactivity is very rare in organic chemistry. Notably boron trifluoride reacts to give diborane and sodium fluoride:

6 NaH + 2 BF_{3} → B_{2}H_{6} + 6 NaF

Si–Si and S–S bonds in disilanes and disulfides are also reduced.

A series of reduction reactions, including the hydrodecyanation of tertiary nitriles, reduction of imines to amines, and amides to aldehydes, can be effected by a composite reagent composed of sodium hydride and an alkali metal iodide (NaH·MI, M = Li, Na).

=== Hydrogen storage ===
Although not commercially significant, sodium hydride has been proposed for hydrogen storage for use in fuel cell vehicles. In one experimental implementation, plastic pellets containing NaH are crushed in the presence of water to release the hydrogen. One challenge with this technology is the regeneration of NaH from the NaOH formed by hydrolysis.

== Practical considerations ==
Sodium hydride is often sold as a mixture of 60% sodium hydride (w/w) in mineral oil. Such a dispersion is safer to handle and weigh than pure NaH. Reactions involving NaH usually require air-free techniques.

== Safety ==
NaH can ignite spontaneously in air. It also reacts vigorously with water or humid air to release hydrogen, which is very flammable, and sodium hydroxide (NaOH), a quite corrosive base. In practice, most sodium hydride is sold as a dispersion in mineral oil, which can be safely handled in air. Although sodium hydride is widely used in DMSO, DMF or DMAc for SN2 type reactions there have been many cases of fires and/or explosions from such mixtures.
