= 2.2.2-Cryptand =

[2.2.2]Cryptand
- Skeletal formula of 2.2.2-cryptand

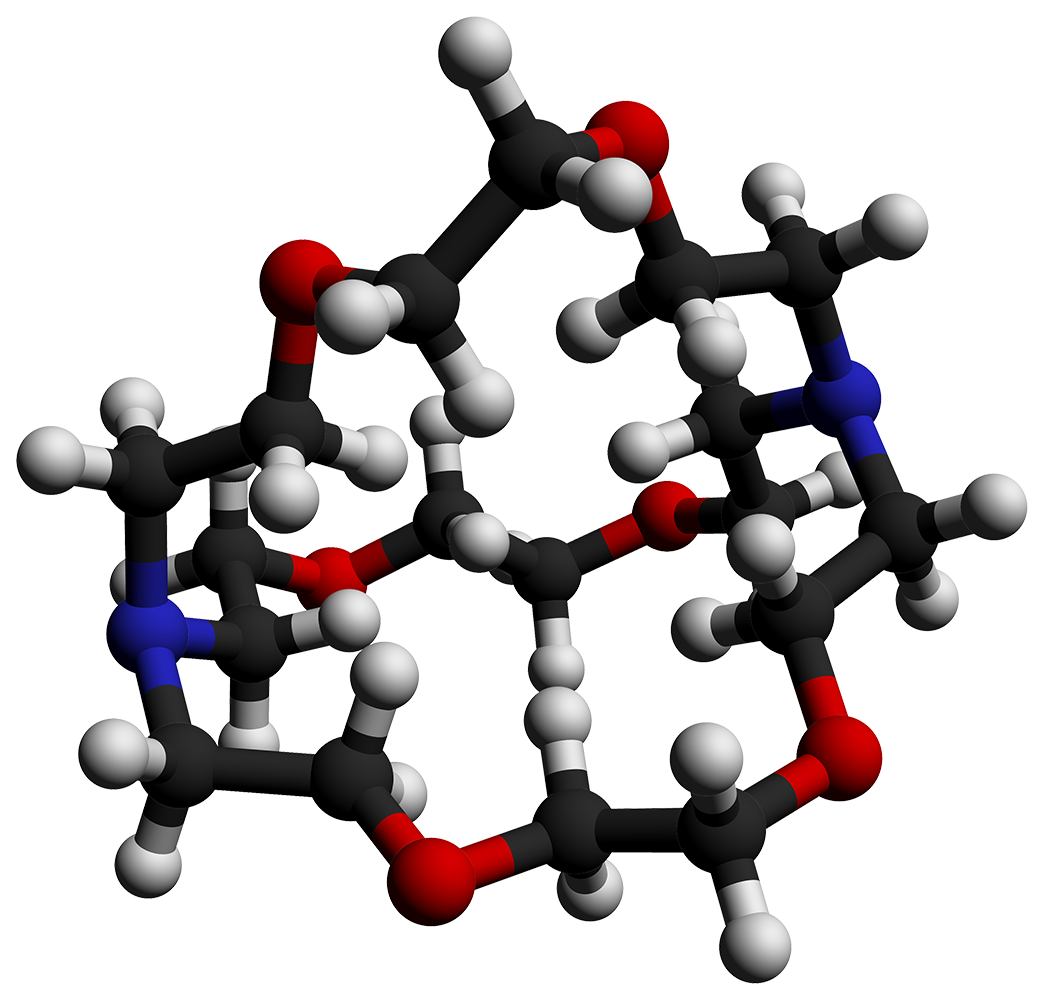

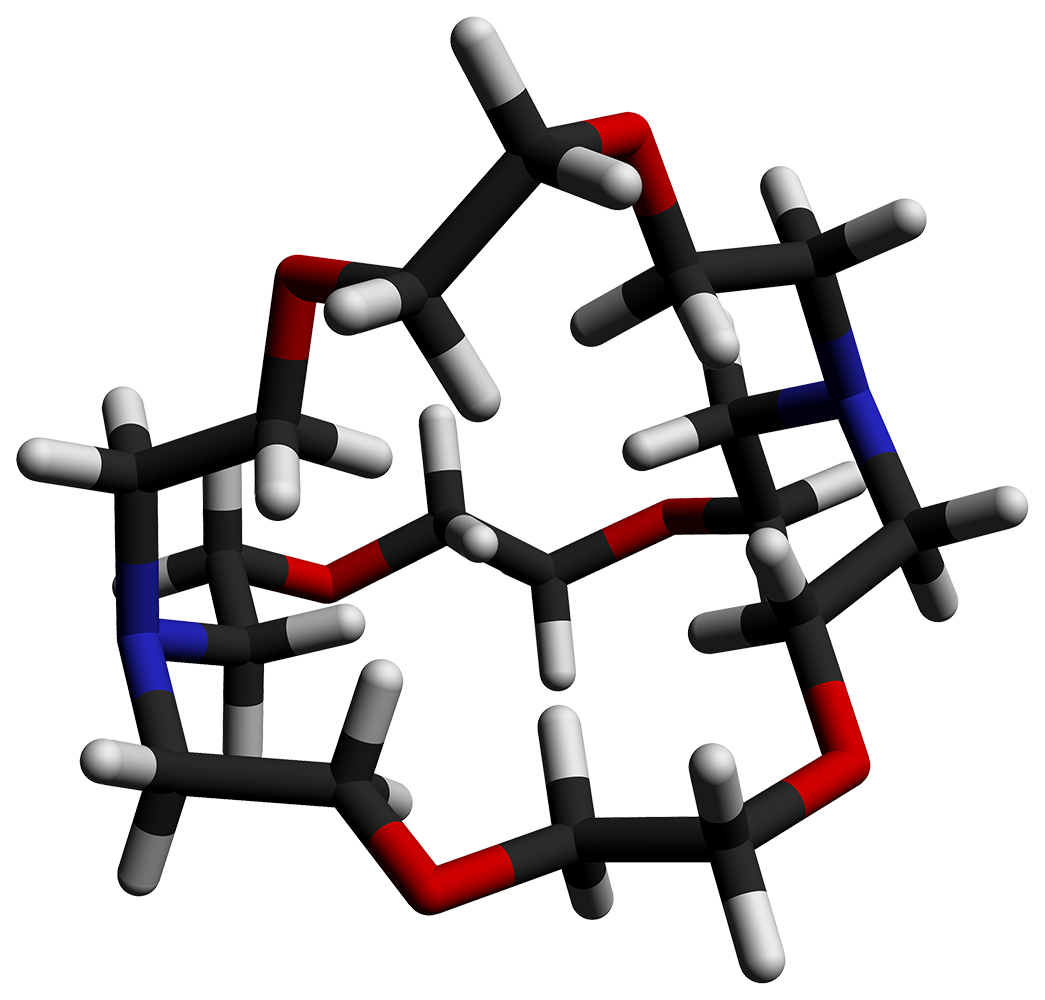

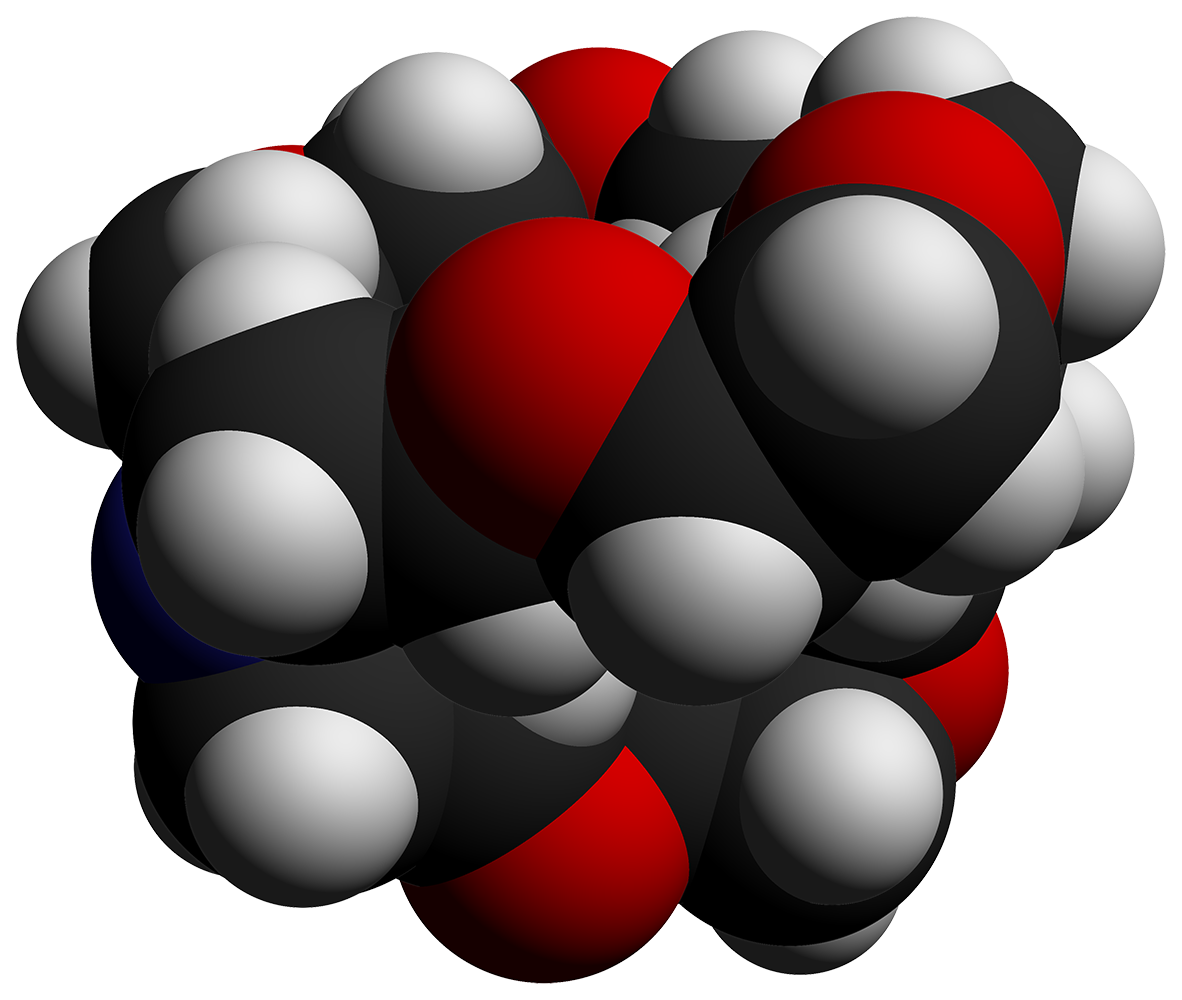

Names
- Preferred IUPAC name 4,7,13,16,21,24-Hexaoxa-1,10-diazabicyclo[8.8.8]hexacosane
- Other names Cryptating agent 222

Identifiers
CAS Number	23978-09-8
3D model (JSmol)	Interactive image
Abbreviations	Crypt-222
Beilstein Reference	620282
ChemSpider	65637
ECHA InfoCard	100.041.770
EC Number	245-962-4
MeSH	Cryptating+agent+222
PubChem CID	72801
RTECS number	MP4750000
UNII	18V22YHN6G
CompTox Dashboard (EPA)	DTXSID00178697
- InChI: InChI=1S/C18H36N2O6/c1-7-21-13-14-24-10-4-20-5-11-25-17-15-22-8-2-19(1)3-9-23-16-18-26-12-6-20/h1-18H2 Key: AUFVJZSDSXXFOI-UHFFFAOYSA-N; InChI=1/C18H36N2O6/c1-7-21-13-14-24-10-4-20-5-11-25-17-15-22-8-2-19(1)3-9-23-16-18-26-12-6-20/h1-18H2 Key: AUFVJZSDSXXFOI-UHFFFAOYAX
- SMILES: C1COCCN2CCOCCOCCN(CCO1)CCOCCOCC2

Properties
Chemical formula	C_{18}N_{2}H_{36}O_{6}
Molar mass	376.4882 g mol^{−1}
Melting point	68 to 71 °C (154 to 160 °F; 341 to 344 K)

Hazards
- GHS labelling
Pictograms	(GHS07: Exclamation mark)
Signal word	Warning
Hazard statements	H315, H319, H335
Precautionary statements	P261, P305+P351+P338
- Except where otherwise noted, data are given for materials in their standard state (at 25 °C [77 °F], 100 kPa). verify (what is ?) Infobox references

[2.2.2]Cryptand is the organic compound with the formula N(CH_{2}CH_{2}OCH_{2}CH_{2}OCH_{2}CH_{2})_{3}N. This bicyclic molecule is the most studied member of the cryptand family of chelating agents. It is a white solid. Many analogous compounds are known. Their high affinity for alkali metal cations illustrates the advantages of "preorganization", a concept within the area of supramolecular chemistry.

For the design and synthesis of [2.2.2]cryptand, Jean-Marie Lehn shared the Nobel Prize in Chemistry. The compound was originally prepared starting with the diacylation of the diamine-diether:

[CH_{2}OCH_{2}CH_{2}NH_{2}]_{2} + [CH_{2}OCH_{2}COCl]_{2} → [CH_{2}OCH_{2}CH_{2}NHC(O)CH_{2}]_{2} + 2 HCl

The resulting macrocyclic diamide is reduced by lithium aluminium hydride. The resulting macrocyclic diamine tetraether reacts with a second equivalent of [CH_{2}OCH_{2}COCl]_{2} to produce the macrobicyclic diamide. This di(tertiary)amide is reduced to the diamine by diborane.

[2.2.2]Cryptand binds K^{+} as an octadentate N_{2}O_{6} ligand. The resulting cation K([2.2.2]cryptand)^{+} is lipophilic.

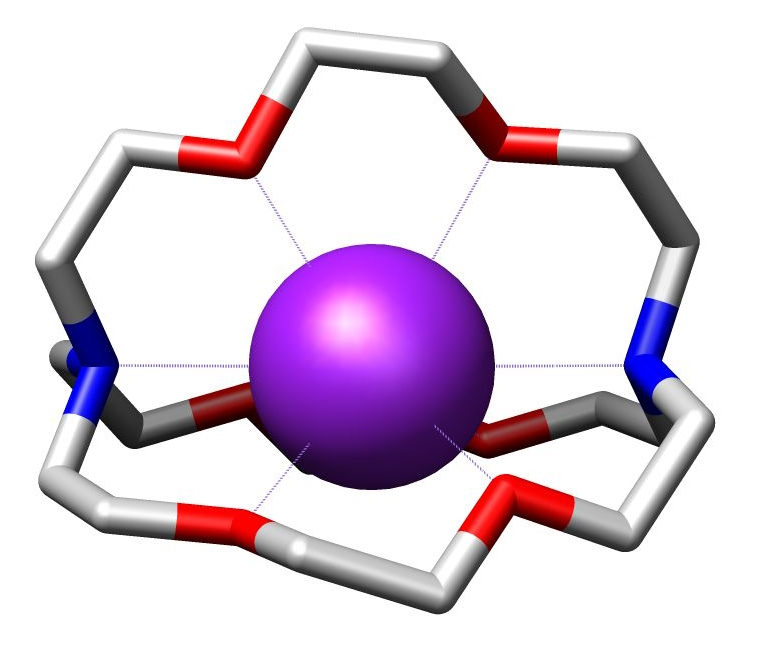
Structure of [2.2.2]cryptand encapsulating a potassium cation (purple) as determined by X-ray crystallography
