= Adamanzane =

Class of chemical compounds

Structure of [1^{4}.2^{2}]adamanzane

Structure of hexamethylenetetramine

Adamanzanes (abbreviated Adz) are compounds containing four nitrogen atoms linked by carbons (analogous to adamantane with nitrogen at the branched position).

Often coordinated to a central ligand, the nitrogens occupy the vertices of a tetrahedron, with potentially four faces and six edges, with the carbon chains running approximately along the edges. They can have a "bowl" or "cage" structure, with varying lengths or omission of the carbon chains. In the nomenclature of Springborg et al. (1996) these can be described according to the number of chains of specified length: thus, for example, [1^{4}.2^{2}]adamanzane is 1,3,6,8-tetraazatricyclo[4.4.1.1^{3,8}]dodecane, a compound which contains four one-carbon chains and two two-carbon chains linking the nitrogen atoms.

[3^{6}]Adamanzane has found a special use in the preparation of "inverse sodium hydride", a compound in which Na^{−} and H^{+} ions coexist, due to the ability of the adamanzane to encapsulate the H^{+} and render it kinetically inert to react with the Na^{−}.
