= Lithium triethylborohydride =

Names
- Preferred IUPAC name Lithium triethylboranuide
- Other names Superhydride; LiTEBH

Identifiers
CAS Number	22560-16-3
3D model (JSmol)	Interactive image
ChemSpider	2006168
ECHA InfoCard	100.040.963
EC Number	245-076-8
PubChem CID	23712863
UNII	Q1ML638JFD
CompTox Dashboard (EPA)	DTXSID10897726
- InChI: InChI=1S/C6H16B.Li/c1-4-7(5-2)6-3;/h7H,4-6H2,1-3H3;/q-1;+1 Key: WCJAYABJWDIZAJ-UHFFFAOYSA-N
- SMILES: [Li+].CC[BH-](CC)CC

Properties
Chemical formula	Li(C_{2}H_{5})_{3}BH
Molar mass	105.95 g/mol
Appearance	Colorless to yellow liquid
Density	0.890 g/cm^{3}, liquid
Boiling point	66 °C (151 °F; 339 K) for THF
Solubility in water	reactive

Hazards
- Occupational safety and health (OHS/OSH)
Main hazards	highly flammable corrosive Causes burns Probable Carcinogen
- GHS labelling
Pictograms	(GHS02: Flammable) (GHS05: Corrosive) (GHS07: Exclamation mark)
Signal word	Danger
Hazard statements	H250, H260, H314, H335
Precautionary statements	P210, P222, P223, P231+P232, P260, P264, P271, P280, P301+P330+P331, P302+P334, P303+P361+P353, P304+P340, P305+P351+P338, P310, P312, P321, P335+P334, P363, P370+P378, P402+P404, P403+P233, P405, P422, P501
NFPA 704 (fire diamond)	3 2 2 W
Safety data sheet (SDS)	External MSDS

Related compounds
Related hydride	Lithium borohydride sodium borohydride sodium hydride lithium aluminium hydride
- Except where otherwise noted, data are given for materials in their standard state (at 25 °C [77 °F], 100 kPa). verify (what is ?) Infobox references

Lithium triethylborohydride is the organoboron compound with the formula LiEt_{3}BH. Commonly referred to as LiTEBH or Superhydride, it is a powerful reducing agent used in organometallic and organic chemistry. It is a colorless or white liquid but is typically marketed and used as a THF solution. The related reducing agent sodium triethylborohydride is commercially available as toluene solutions.

LiBHEt_{3} is a stronger reducing agent than lithium borohydride and lithium aluminium hydride.

== Preparation ==
LiBHEt_{3} is prepared by the reaction of lithium hydride (LiH) and triethylborane (Et_{3}B) in tetrahydrofuran (THF):

LiH + Et_{3}B → LiEt_{3}BH

The resulting THF complex is stable indefinitely in the absence of moisture and air.

== Reactions ==
Alkyl halides are reduced to the alkanes by LiBHEt_{3}.

LiBHEt_{3} reduces a wide range of functional groups, but so do many other hydride reagents. Instead, LiBHEt_{3} is reserved for difficult substrates, such as sterically hindered carbonyls, as illustrated by reduction of 2,2,4,4-tetramethyl-3-pentanone. Otherwise, it reduces acid anhydrides to alcohols and the carboxylic acid, not to the diol. Similarly lactones reduce to diols. α,β-Enones undergo 1,4-addition to give lithium enolates. Disulfides reduce to thiols (via thiolates). LiBHEt_{3} deprotonates carboxylic acids, but does not reduce the resulting lithium carboxylates. For similar reasons, epoxides undergo ring-opening upon treatment with LiBHEt_{3} to give the alcohol. With unsymmetrical epoxides, the reaction can proceed with high regio- and stereo- selectivity, favoring attack at the least hindered position:

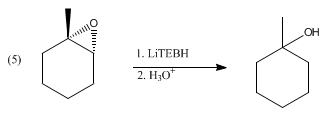

Acetals and ketals are not reduced by LiBHEt_{3}. It can be used in the reductive cleavage of mesylates and tosylates. LiBHEt_{3} can selectively deprotect tertiary N-acyl groups without affecting secondary amide functionality. It has also been shown to reduce aromatic esters to the corresponding alcohols as shown in eq 6 and 7.

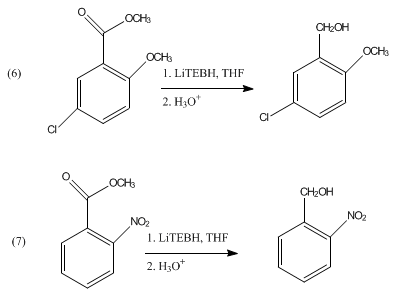

LiBHEt_{3} also reduces pyridine and isoquinolines to piperidines and tetrahydroisoquinolines respectively.
The reduction of β-hydroxysulfinyl imines with catecholborane and LiBHEt_{3} produces anti-1,3-amino alcohols shown in (8).

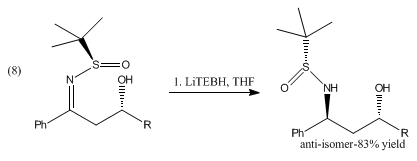

== Precautions ==
LiBHEt_{3} reacts exothermically, potentially violently, with water, alcohols, and acids, releasing hydrogen and the pyrophoric triethylborane.
