= Hydride =

Molecule with a hydrogen bound to a more electropositive element or group

In chemistry, a hydride is formally the anion of hydrogen (H^{−}), a hydrogen ion with two electrons. In modern usage, this is typically only used for ionic bonds, but it is sometimes (and has been more frequently in the past) applied to all compounds containing covalently bound H atoms. In this broad and potentially archaic sense, water (H_{2}O) is a hydride of oxygen, ammonia is a hydride of nitrogen, etc. In covalent compounds, it implies hydrogen is attached to a less electronegative element. In such cases, the H centre has nucleophilic character, which contrasts with the protic character of acids. The hydride anion is very rarely observed.

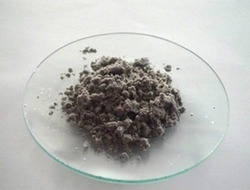
Sodium hydride as an example of hydride salt

Almost all of the elements up to Cf form binary compounds with hydrogen, the exceptions being He, Ne, Ar, Kr, Pm, Rn, Fr, and Ra. Exotic molecules such as positronium hydride have also been made.

== Bonds ==
Bonds between hydrogen and the other elements range from being highly ionic to somewhat covalent. Some hydrides, e.g. boron hydrides, do not conform to classical electron counting rules and the bonding is described in terms of multi-centered bonds, whereas the interstitial hydrides often involve metallic bonding. Hydrides can be discrete molecules, oligomers or polymers, ionic solids, chemisorbed monolayers, bulk metals (interstitial), or other materials. While hydrides traditionally react as Lewis bases or reducing agents, some metal hydrides behave as hydrogen-atom donors and act as acids.

== Applications ==
Tris(trimethylsilyl)silane is an example of a hydride with a weak bond to H. It is used as a source of hydrogen atoms.

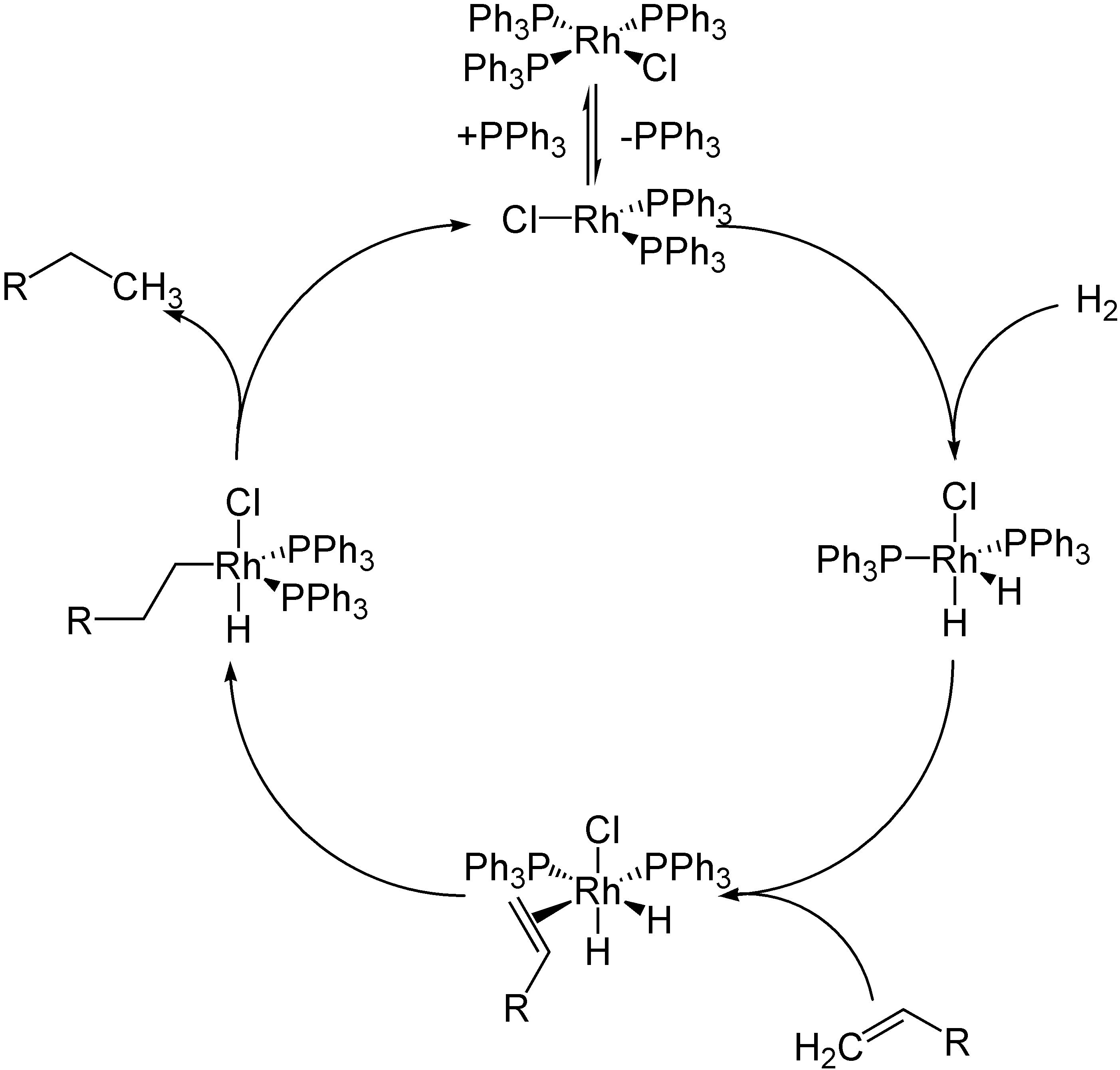
Metal hydrides (e.g. H_{2}RhCl(PPh_{3})_{2} derived from Wilkinson's catalyst) are intermediates in hydrogenation catalysis.

- Hydrides such as sodium borohydride, lithium aluminium hydride, diisobutylaluminium hydride (DIBAL) and super hydride, are commonly used as reducing agents in chemical synthesis. The hydride adds to an electrophilic center, typically unsaturated carbon.
- Hydrides such as sodium hydride and potassium hydride are used as strong bases in organic synthesis. The hydride reacts with the weak Bronsted acid releasing H_{2}.
- Hydrides such as calcium hydride are used as desiccants, i.e. drying agents, to remove trace water from organic solvents. The hydride reacts with water forming hydrogen and hydroxide salt. The dry solvent can then be distilled or vacuum transferred from the "solvent pot".
- Hydrides are important in storage battery technologies such as nickel-metal hydride battery. Various metal hydrides have been examined for use as a means of hydrogen storage for fuel cell-powered electric cars and other proposed aspects of a hydrogen economy.
- Hydride complexes are catalysts and catalytic intermediates in a variety of homogeneous and heterogeneous catalytic cycles. Important examples include hydrogenation, hydroformylation, hydrosilylation, hydrodesulfurization catalysts. Even certain enzymes, the hydrogenase, operate via hydride intermediates. The energy carrier nicotinamide adenine dinucleotide reacts as a hydride donor or hydride equivalent.

== Hydride ion ==
Free hydride anions exist only under extreme conditions and are not invoked for homogeneous solution. Instead, many compounds have hydrogen centres with hydridic character.

Aside from electride, the hydride ion is the simplest possible anion, consisting of two electrons and a proton. Hydrogen has a relatively low electron affinity, 72.77 kJ/mol and reacts exothermically with protons as a powerful Lewis base.

H^{−} + H^{+} → H_{2} ΔH = −1676 kJ/mol

The low electron affinity of hydrogen and the strength of the H–H bond (ΔH_{BE} = 436 kJ/mol) means that the hydride ion would also be a strong reducing agent

H_{2} + 2 e^{−} ⇌ 2 H^{−} E^{⊖} = −2.25 V

== Types of hydrides ==
According to the general definition, every element of the periodic table (except some noble gases) forms one or more hydrides. These substances have been classified into three main types according to the nature of their bonding:

- Ionic hydrides, which have significant ionic bonding character.
- Covalent hydrides, which include the hydrocarbons and many other compounds which covalently bond to hydrogen atoms.
- Interstitial hydrides, which may be described as having metallic bonding.

While these divisions have not been used universally, they are still useful to understand differences in hydrides.

=== Ionic hydrides ===
These are stoichiometric compounds of hydrogen. Ionic or saline hydrides are composed of hydride bound to an electropositive metal, generally an alkali metal or alkaline earth metal. The divalent lanthanides such as europium and ytterbium form compounds similar to those of heavier alkaline earth metals. In these materials the hydride is viewed as a pseudohalide. Saline hydrides are insoluble in conventional solvents, reflecting their non-molecular structures. Ionic hydrides are used as bases and, occasionally, as reducing reagents in organic synthesis.

C_{6}H_{5}C(O)CH_{3} + KH → C_{6}H_{5}C(O)CH_{2}K + H_{2}

Typical solvents for such reactions are ethers. Water and other protic solvents cannot serve as a medium for ionic hydrides because the hydride ion is a stronger base than hydroxide and most hydroxyl anions. Hydrogen gas is liberated in a typical acid-base reaction.

NaH + H_{2}O → H_{2}(g) + NaOH
ΔH = −83.6 kJ/mol, ΔG = −109.0 kJ/mol

Often alkali metal hydrides react with metal halides. Lithium aluminium hydride (often abbreviated as LAH) arises from reactions of lithium hydride with aluminium chloride.

4 LiH + AlCl_{3} → LiAlH_{4} + 3 LiCl

=== Covalent hydrides ===
According to some definitions, covalent hydrides cover all other compounds containing hydrogen. Some definitions limit hydrides to hydrogen centres that formally react as hydrides, i.e. are nucleophilic, and hydrogen atoms bound to metal centers. These hydrides are formed by all the true non-metals (except zero group elements) and the elements Be, Zn, Cd, Hg, Al, Ga, In, Tl, Sn, Pb, Bi, and Po, which are normally metallic in nature, i.e., this class includes the hydrides of p-block elements. In these substances, the hydride bond is formally a covalent bond much like the bond made by a proton in a weak acid. This category includes hydrides that exist as discrete molecules, polymers or oligomers, and hydrogen that has been chem-adsorbed to a surface. A particularly important segment of covalent hydrides are complex metal hydrides, powerful soluble hydrides commonly used in synthetic procedures.

Molecular hydrides often involve additional ligands; for example, diisobutylaluminium hydride (DIBAL) consists of two aluminum centers bridged by hydride ligands. Hydrides that are soluble in common solvents are widely used in organic synthesis. Particularly common are sodium borohydride (NaBH_{4}) and lithium aluminium hydride and hindered reagents such as DIBAL.

=== Interstitial hydrides or metallic hydrides ===
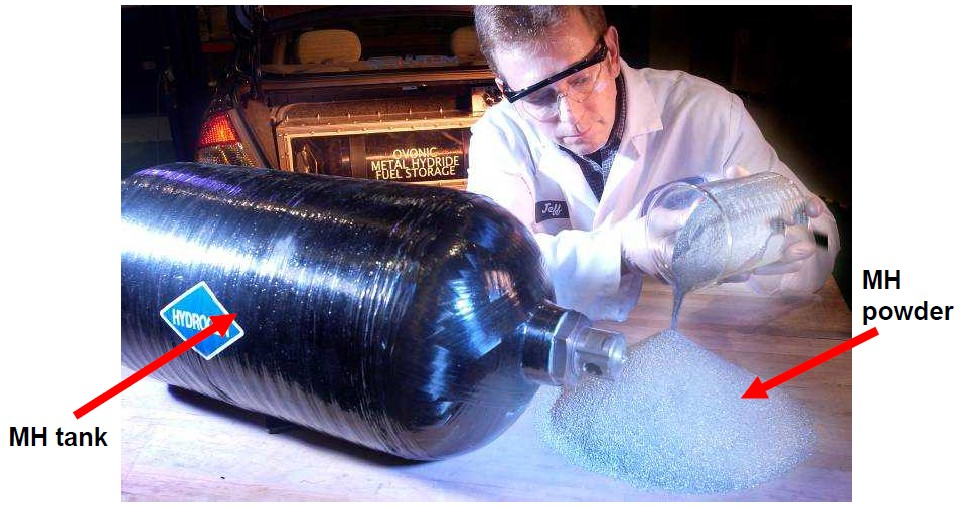
Metal hydride for hydrogen storage applications

Interstitial hydrides most commonly exist within metals or alloys. They are traditionally termed "compounds" even though they do not strictly conform to the definition of a compound, more closely resembling common alloys such as steel. In such hydrides, hydrogen can exist as either atomic or diatomic entities. Mechanical or thermal processing, such as bending, striking, or annealing, may cause the hydrogen to precipitate out of solution by degassing. Their bonding is generally considered metallic. Such bulk transition metals and lanthanides, form interstitial binary hydrides when exposed to hydrogen. These systems are usually non-stoichiometric, with variable amounts of hydrogen atoms in the lattice. In materials engineering, the phenomenon of hydrogen embrittlement results from the formation of interstitial hydrides. Hydrides of this type form according to either one of two main mechanisms. The first mechanism involves the adsorption of dihydrogen, succeeded by the cleaving of the H-H bond, the delocalisation of the hydrogen's electrons, and finally the diffusion of the protons into the metal lattice. The other main mechanism involves the electrolytic reduction of ionised hydrogen on the surface of the metal lattice, also followed by the diffusion of the protons into the lattice. The second mechanism is responsible for the observed temporary volume expansion of certain electrodes used in electrolytic experiments.

Palladium absorbs up to 900 times its own volume of hydrogen at room temperatures, forming palladium hydride. This material has been discussed as a means to carry hydrogen for vehicular fuel cells. Interstitial hydrides show certain promise as a way for safe hydrogen storage. Neutron diffraction studies have shown that hydrogen atoms randomly occupy the octahedral interstices in the metal lattice (in an fcc lattice there is one octahedral hole per metal atom). The limit of absorption at normal pressures is PdH0.7, indicating that approximately 70% of the octahedral holes are occupied.

Many interstitial hydrides have been developed that readily absorb and discharge hydrogen at room temperature and atmospheric pressure. They are usually based on intermetallic compounds and solid-solution alloys. However, their application is still limited, as they are capable of storing only about 2 weight percent of hydrogen, insufficient for automotive applications.

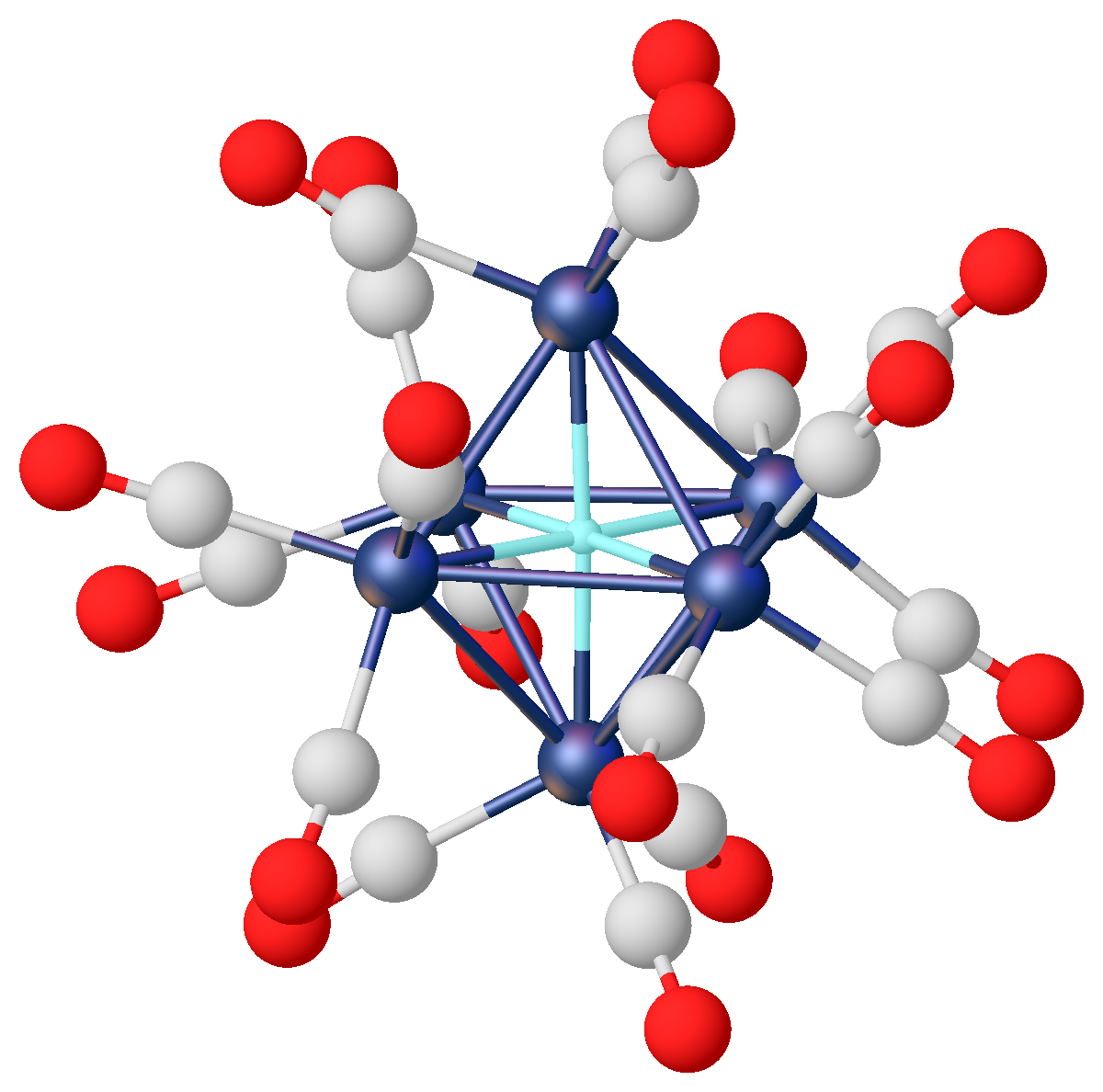
Structure of [HRu_{6}(CO)_{18}]^{−}, a metal cluster with an interstitial hydride ligand (small turquoise sphere at center).

=== Transition metal hydride complexes ===
Transition metal hydrides include compounds that can be classified as covalent hydrides. Some are even classified as interstitial hydrides and other bridging hydrides. Classical transition metal hydride feature a single bond between the hydrogen centre and the transition metal. Some transition metal hydrides are acidic, e.g., HCo(CO)_{4} and H_{2}Fe(CO)_{4}. The anions potassium nonahydridorhenate [ReH_{9}]^{2−} and [FeH_{6}]^{4−} are examples from the growing collection of known molecular homoleptic metal hydrides. As pseudohalides, hydride ligands are capable of bonding with positively polarized hydrogen centres. This interaction, called dihydrogen bonding, is similar to hydrogen bonding, which exists between positively polarized protons and electronegative atoms with open lone pairs.

=== Isotopes ===
Hydrides containing protium are known as protides, hydrides containing deuterium are known as deuterides, and hydrides containing tritium are known as tritides. Some deuterides, such as LiD, are important fusion fuels in thermonuclear weapons and useful moderators in nuclear reactors.

=== Mixed anion compounds ===
Mixed anion compounds exist that contain hydride with other anions. These include boride hydrides, carbohydrides, hydridonitrides, oxyhydrides and others.

== Appendix on nomenclature ==
Protide, deuteride and tritide are used to describe ions or compounds that contain enriched hydrogen-1, deuterium or tritium, respectively.

In the classic meaning, hydride refers to any compound hydrogen forms with other elements, ranging over groups 1–16 (the binary compounds of hydrogen). The following is a list of the nomenclature for the hydride derivatives of main group compounds according to this definition:

- alkali and alkaline earth metals: metal hydride
- boron: borane, BH_{3}
- aluminium: alumane, AlH_{3}
- gallium: gallane, GaH_{3}
- indium: indigane, InH_{3}
- thallium: thallane, TlH_{3}
- carbon: alkanes, alkenes, alkynes, and all hydrocarbons
- silicon: silane
- germanium: germane
- tin: stannane
- lead: plumbane
- nitrogen: ammonia ("azane" when substituted), hydrazine
- phosphorus: phosphine (note "phosphane" is the IUPAC recommended name)
- arsenic: arsine (note "arsane" is the IUPAC recommended name)
- antimony: stibine (note "stibane" is the IUPAC recommended name)
- bismuth: bismuthine (note "bismuthane" is the IUPAC recommended name)
- helium: helium hydride (only exists as an ion)

According to the convention above, the following are "hydrogen compounds" and not "hydrides":

- oxygen: water ("oxidane" when substituted; synonym: hydrogen oxide), hydrogen peroxide
- sulfur: hydrogen sulfide ("sulfane" when substituted)
- selenium: hydrogen selenide ("selane" when substituted)
- tellurium: hydrogen telluride ("tellane" when substituted)
- polonium: hydrogen polonide ("polane" when substituted)
- halogens: hydrogen halides

Examples:

- nickel hydride: used in NiMH batteries
- palladium hydride: electrodes in cold fusion experiments
- lithium aluminium hydride: a powerful reducing agent used in organic chemistry
- sodium borohydride: selective specialty reducing agent, hydrogen storage in fuel cells
- sodium hydride: a powerful base used in organic chemistry
- diborane: reducing agent, rocket fuel, semiconductor dopant, catalyst, used in organic synthesis; also borane, pentaborane and decaborane
- arsine: used for doping semiconductors
- stibine: used in semiconductor industry
- phosphine: used for fumigation
- silane: many industrial uses, e.g. manufacture of composite materials and water repellents
- ammonia: coolant, fuel, fertilizer, many other industrial uses
- hydrogen sulfide: component of natural gas, important source of sulfur
- Chemically, even water and hydrocarbons could be considered hydrides.

All metalloid hydrides are highly flammable. All solid non-metallic hydrides except ice are highly flammable. But when hydrogen combines with halogens it produces acids rather than hydrides, and they are not flammable.

=== Precedence convention ===
According to IUPAC convention, by precedence (stylized electronegativity), hydrogen falls between group 15 and group 16 elements. Therefore, we have NH_{3}, "nitrogen hydride" (ammonia), versus H_{2}O, "hydrogen oxide" (water). This convention is sometimes broken for polonium, which on the grounds of polonium's metallicity is often referred to as "polonium hydride" instead of the expected "hydrogen polonide".

== See also ==
- Parent hydride
- Hydron (hydrogen cation)
- Hydronium
- Proton
- Hydrogen ion
- Hydride compressor
- Superhydrides

== Bibliography ==
- W. M. Mueller, J. P. Blackledge, G. G. Libowitz, Metal Hydrides, Academic Press, N.Y. and London, (1968)
