= MTH =

MTH may refer to:

- Florida Keys Marathon Airport, US, IATA airport code
- MTH Electric Trains, toy train manufacturer
- MTH Racing engines, Austrian manufacturer
- Methylcyclohexane-Toluen-Hydrogen system, a liquid organic hydrogen carrier
- Maximum The Hormone, a Japanese Hardcore/Metal band.
- Motherwell railway station, North Lanarkshire, Scotland, National Rail station code

== See also ==
- M.Th., Master of Theology
- Mathematics
