= Complex metal hydride =

Complex metal hydrides are salts wherein the anions contain hydrides. In older chemical literature and even in contemporary materials science textbooks, a "metal hydride" is assumed to be nonmolecular, i.e. three-dimensional lattices of atomic ions. In such systems, hydrides are often interstitial and nonstoichiometric, and the bonding between the metal and hydrogen atoms is significantly ionic. In contrast, complex metal hydrides typically contain more than one type of metal or metalloid and may be soluble but invariably react with water. They exhibit ionic bonding between a positive metal ion with molecular anions containing the hydride. In such materials the hydrogen is bonded with significant covalent character to the second metal or metalloid atoms.

== Examples ==
In general, complex metal hydrides have the formula M_{x}M'_{y}H_{n}, where M is an alkali metal cation or cation complex and M' is a metal or metalloid. Well known examples feature group 13 elements, especially boron and aluminium including sodium aluminium hydride, NaAlH_{4} ), lithium aluminium hydride, LiAlH_{4}, and lithium borohydride, (LiBH_{4}). Complex metal hydrides are often soluble in etherial solvents. Other complex metal hydrides are numerous. Illustrative examples include the salts [MgBr(THF)_{2}]_{4}FeH_{6} and K_{2}ReH_{9}.

== See also ==
- Ionic hydrides
- Hydrogen storage
