= Wolfgang Arlt =

German engineer

Wolfgang Arlt is a German thermodynamicist. Until his retirement in 2018, he was professor at the TU Berlin and since 2004 at the Friedrich-Alexander-Universität Erlangen-Nürnberg.

== Life ==
After studying chemistry with a focus on physical chemistry at the University of Dortmund, he became a research assistant for Ulfert Onken at the same university in 1976 in the field of chemical engineering. During his doctorate, he helped set up the Dortmund Data Bank. After completing his doctorate as Dr.-Ing. in 1981 he moved to the company Bayer, where he worked on thermal separation processes. In 1987 he switched to plastics research in-house and worked in a leading position in setting up a production facility for a thermoplastic in Antwerp . After completing this work, he returned to the process engineering department in Leverkusen.

In 1992 he accepted a position as professor for thermodynamics and thermal process engineering at Technische Universität Berlin. During this time he developed, among other things, a recycling process for mixed thermoplastics (e.g. packaging material). He donated part of the proceeds of the corresponding patent in favor of the Philotherm Prize founded by Prof. Knapp, which honors students for special achievements in the subject of thermodynamics. In 2004 he moved to the Friedrich-Alexander-Universität Erlangen-Nürnberg, where he has held the chair for thermal process engineering ever since. In 2009 he founded the Siegfried Peter Prize for high pressure technology, which is usually awarded every two years for outstanding research in the field of high pressure process engineering. He stayed as a professor in Erlangen until his retirement in 2018.

From 2011 to the beginning of 2017 he was the spokesman for the scientific management of the Energie Campus Nürnberg, which he initiated. In 2018 he received the Emil Kirschbaum Medal for his groundbreaking developments in fluid process engineering. Together with Peter Wasserscheid and Daniel Teichmann, he was nominated for the German Future Prize 2018 for his work on the development of liquid organic hydrogen carriers (LOHC). In 2023 he received the Order of Merit of the Federal Republic of Germany.
