= Lithium aluminium hydride =

Wireframe model of lithium aluminium hydride
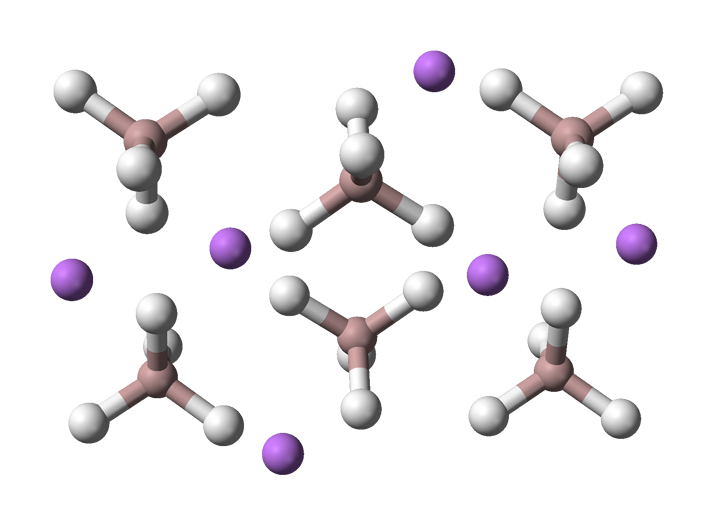
Unit cell ball and stick model of lithium aluminium hydride
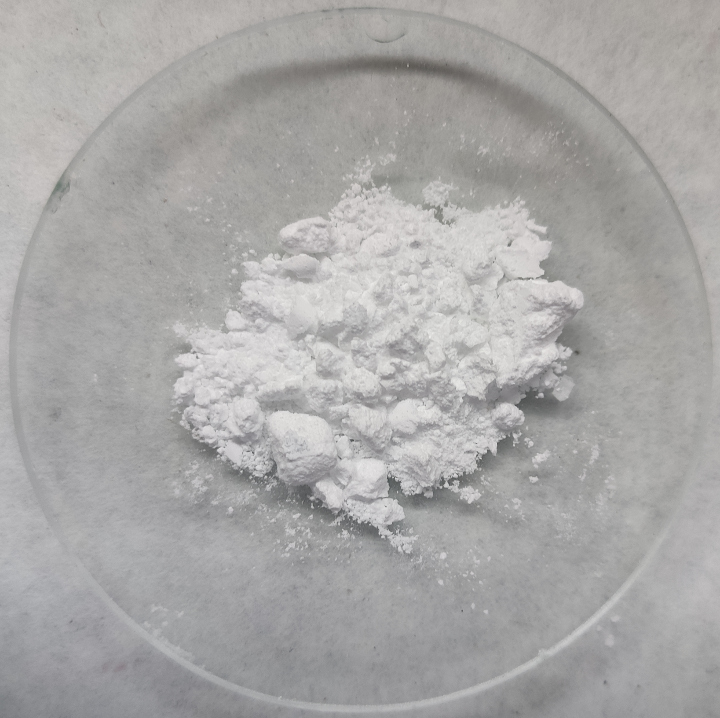
- Lithium aluminium hydride

Names
- Preferred IUPAC name Lithium tetrahydridoaluminate(III)
- Systematic IUPAC name Lithium alumanuide
- Other names: Lithium aluminium hydride; Lithal; Lithium alanate; Lithium aluminohydride; Lithium tetrahydridoaluminate

Identifiers
CAS Number	16853-85-3; 14128-54-2 (^{2}H_{4})
3D model (JSmol)	Interactive image; (^{2}H_{4}): Interactive image; (^{3}H_{4}): Interactive image
Abbreviations	LAH
ChEBI	CHEBI:30142
ChemSpider	26150
ECHA InfoCard	100.037.146
EC Number	240-877-9
Gmelin Reference	13167
PubChem CID	28112; 11062293 (^{2}H_{4}); 11094533 (^{3}H_{4})
RTECS number	BD0100000
UNII	77UJC875H4
UN number	1410
CompTox Dashboard (EPA)	DTXSID70893441
- InChI: InChI=1S/Al.Li.4H/q-1;+1;;;; Key: OCZDCIYGECBNKL-UHFFFAOYSA-N; InChI=1S/Al.Li.4H/q-1;+1;;;; Key: OCZDCIYGECBNKL-UHFFFAOYSA-N
- SMILES: [Li+].[AlH4-]; (^{2}H_{4}): [2H][Al-]([2H])([2H])[2H].[Li+]; (^{3}H_{4}): [3H][Al-]([3H])([3H])[3H].[Li+]

Properties
Chemical formula	Li[AlH_{4}]
Molar mass	37.95 g·mol^{−1}
Appearance	white crystals (pure samples) grey powder (commercial material)
Odor	odorless
Density	0.917 g/cm^{3}, solid
Melting point	150 °C (302 °F; 423 K) (decomposes)
Solubility in water	Reacts
Solubility in tetrahydrofuran	112.332 g/L
Solubility in diethyl ether	39.5 g/100 ml

Structure
Crystal structure	monoclinic
Space group	P2_{1}/c

Thermochemistry
Heat capacity (C)	86.4 J/(mol·K)
Std molar entropy (S^{⦵}_{298})	87.9 J/(mol·K)
Std enthalpy of formation (Δ_{f}H^{⦵}_{298})	−117 kJ/mol
Gibbs free energy (Δ_{f}G^{⦵})	−48.4 kJ/mol

Hazards
- GHS labelling
Pictograms	(GHS02: Flammable) (GHS05: Corrosive)
Signal word	Danger
Hazard statements	H260, H314
Precautionary statements	P223, P231+P232, P280, P305+P351+P338, P370+P378, P422
NFPA 704 (fire diamond)	3 2 2 W
Flash point	125 °C (257 °F; 398 K)
Safety data sheet (SDS)	Lithium aluminium hydride

Related compounds
Related hydride	aluminium hydride sodium borohydride sodium hydride Sodium aluminium hydride
- Except where otherwise noted, data are given for materials in their standard state (at 25 °C [77 °F], 100 kPa). verify (what is ?) Infobox references

Lithium aluminium hydride, commonly abbreviated to LAH, is an inorganic compound with the chemical formula Li[AlH_{4}] or LiAlH_{4}. It is a white solid, discovered by Finholt, Bond and Schlesinger in 1947. This compound is used as a reducing agent in organic synthesis, especially for the reduction of esters, carboxylic acids, and amides. The solid is dangerously reactive toward water, releasing gaseous hydrogen (H_{2}). Some related derivatives were once discussed for hydrogen storage.

== Properties, structure, preparation ==
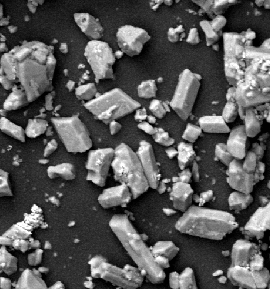
Scanning Electron Microscope image of LAH powder

LAH is a colourless solid, but commercial samples are usually gray due to contamination. This material can be purified by recrystallization from diethyl ether. Large-scale purifications employ a Soxhlet extractor. Commonly, the impure gray material is used in synthesis, since the impurities are innocuous and can be easily separated from the organic products. The pure powdered material is pyrophoric but not its large crystals. Some commercial materials contain mineral oil to inhibit reactions with atmospheric moisture, but more commonly it is packed in moisture-proof plastic sacks.

LAH violently reacts with water to liberate hydrogen gas. The reaction proceeds according to the following idealized equation:

Li[AlH_{4}] + 4 H_{2}O → LiOH + Al(OH)_{3} + 4 H_{2}

This reaction could be used to generate hydrogen in the laboratory. Aged, air-exposed samples often appear white because they have absorbed sufficient moisture to generate a mixture of the white compounds lithium hydroxide and aluminium hydroxide.

=== Structure ===
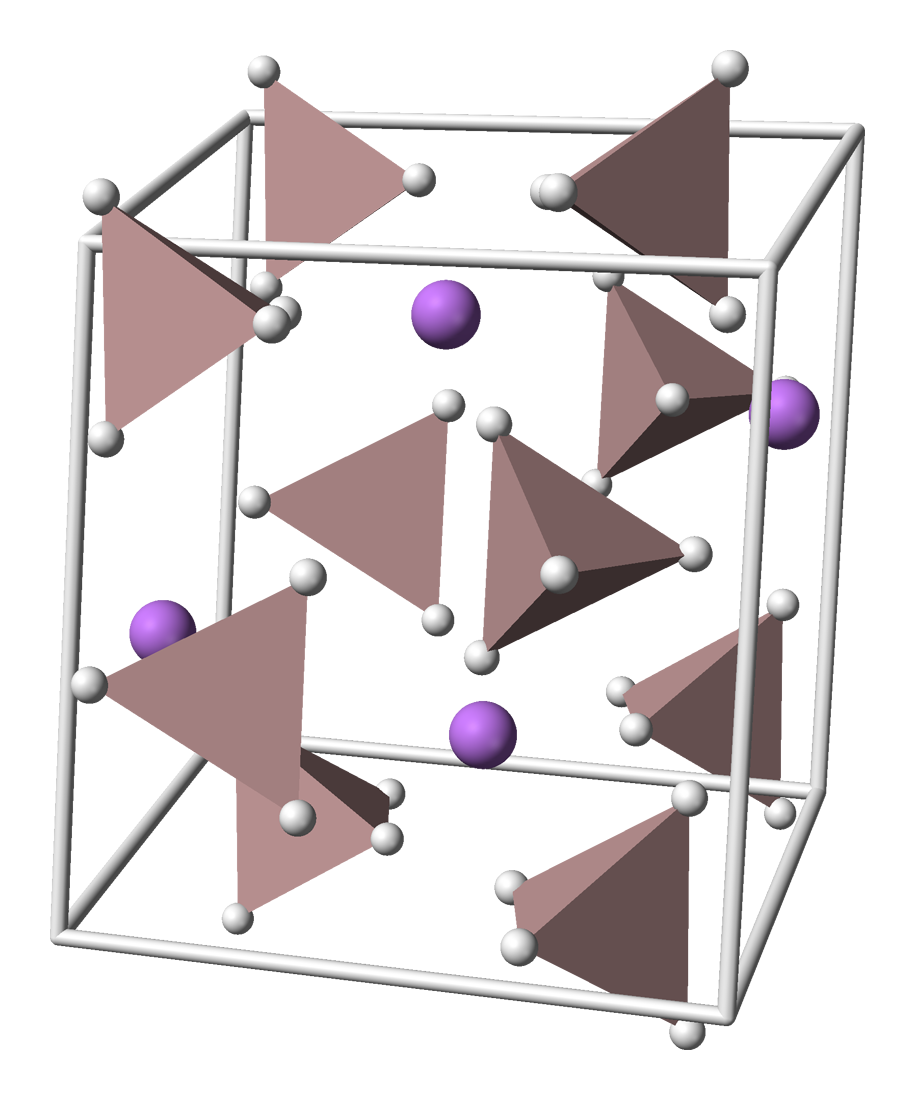
The crystal structure of LAH; Li atoms are purple and AlH_{4} tetrahedra are tan.

LAH crystallizes in the monoclinic space group P2_{1}/c. The unit cell has the dimensions: a = 4.82, b = 7.81, and c = 7.92 Å, α = γ = 90° and β = 112°. In the structure, Li^{+} cations are surrounded by five [AlH_{4}]^{−} anions, which have tetrahedral molecular geometry. The Li^{+} cations are bonded to one hydrogen atom from each of the surrounding tetrahedral [AlH_{4}]^{−} anion creating a bipyramid arrangement. At high pressures (>2.2 GPa) a phase transition may occur to give β-LAH.

X-ray powder diffraction pattern of as-received Li[AlH_{4}]. The asterisk designates an impurity, possibly LiCl.

=== Preparation ===
Li[AlH_{4}] was first prepared from the reaction between lithium hydride (LiH) and aluminium chloride:

4 LiH + AlCl_{3} → Li[AlH_{4}] + 3 LiCl

In addition to this method, the industrial synthesis entails the initial preparation of sodium aluminium hydride from the elements under high pressure and temperature:

Na + Al + 2 H_{2} → Na[AlH_{4}]

Li[AlH_{4}] is then prepared by a salt metathesis reaction according to:

Na[AlH_{4}] + LiCl → Li[AlH_{4}] + NaCl

LiCl is removed by filtration from an ethereal solution of LAH, with subsequent precipitation of LAH to yield a product containing around 1 wt% LiCl.

An alternative preparation starts from LiH, and metallic Al instead of AlCl_{3}. Catalyzed by a small quantity of TiCl_{3} (0.2%), the reaction proceeds well using dimethylether as solvent. This method avoids the cogeneration of salt.

=== Solubility data ===
Solubility of Li[AlH_{4}] (mol/L)
Solvent	Temperature (°C)				
Solvent	0	25	50	75	100
Diethyl ether	–	5.92	–	–	–
THF	–	2.96	–	–	–
Monoglyme	1.29	1.80	2.57	3.09	3.34
Diglyme	0.26	1.29	1.54	2.06	2.06
Triglyme	0.56	0.77	1.29	1.80	2.06
Tetraglyme	0.77	1.54	2.06	2.06	1.54
Dioxane	–	0.03	–	–	–
Dibutyl ether	–	0.56	–	–	–

LAH is soluble in many ethereal solutions. However, it may spontaneously decompose due to the presence of catalytic impurities, though, it appears to be more stable in tetrahydrofuran (THF). Thus, THF is preferred over, e.g., diethyl ether, despite the lower solubility.

=== Thermal decomposition ===
LAH is metastable at room temperature. During prolonged storage it slowly decomposes to Li_{3}[AlH_{6}] (lithium hexahydridoaluminate) and LiH. This process can be accelerated by the presence of catalytic elements, such as titanium, iron or vanadium.

Differential scanning calorimetry of as-received Li[AlH_{4}].

When heated LAH decomposes in a three-step reaction mechanism:

3 Li[AlH_{4}] → Li_{3}[AlH_{6}] + 2 Al + 3 H_{2}	R1

2 Li_{3}[AlH_{6}] → 6 LiH + 2 Al + 3 H_{2}	R2

2 LiH + 2 Al → 2 LiAl + H_{2}	R3

R1 is usually initiated by the melting of LAH in the temperature range 150–170 °C, immediately followed by decomposition into solid Li_{3}[AlH_{6}], although R1 is known to proceed below the melting point of Li[AlH_{4}] as well. At about 200 °C, Li_{3}[AlH_{6}] decomposes into LiH (R2) and Al which subsequently convert into LiAl above 400 °C (R3). Reaction R1 is effectively irreversible. R3 is reversible with an equilibrium pressure of about 0.25 bar at 500 °C. R1 and R2 can occur at room temperature with suitable catalysts.

=== Thermodynamic data ===
The table summarizes thermodynamic data for LAH and reactions involving LAH, in the form of standard enthalpy, entropy, and Gibbs free energy change, respectively.

Thermodynamic data for reactions involving Li[AlH_{4}]
Reaction	ΔH^{⦵} (kJ/mol)	ΔS^{⦵} (J/(mol·K))	ΔG^{⦵} (kJ/mol)	Comment
Li(s) + Al(s) + 2 H_{2}(g) → Li[AlH_{4}](s)	−116.3	−240.1	−44.7	Standard formation from the elements.
LiH (s) + Al(s) + 3/2 H_{2}(g) → LiAlH_{4}(s)	−95.6	−180.2	237.6	Using Δ_{f}H^{⦵}(LiH) = −90.579865, Δ_{f}S^{⦵}(LiH) = −679.9, and Δ_{f}G^{⦵}(LiH) = −67.31235744.
Li[AlH_{4}](s) → Li[AlH_{4}](l)	22	–	–	Heat of fusion. Value might be unreliable.
LiAlH_{4}(l) → 1/3 Li_{3}AlH_{6}(s) + 2/3 Al(s) + H_{2}(g)	3.46	104.5	−27.68	ΔS^{⦵} calculated from reported values of ΔH^{⦵} and ΔG^{⦵}.

== Applications ==
=== Use in organic chemistry ===
Lithium aluminium hydride (LAH) is widely used in organic chemistry as a reducing agent. It is more powerful than the related reagent sodium borohydride owing to the weaker Al-H bond compared to the B-H bond. Often as a solution in diethyl ether and followed by an acid workup, it will convert esters, carboxylic acids, acyl chlorides, aldehydes, and ketones into the corresponding alcohols (see: carbonyl reduction). Similarly, it converts amide, nitro, nitrile, imine, oxime, and organic azides into the amines (see: amide reduction). It reduces quaternary ammonium cations into the corresponding tertiary amines. Reactivity can be tuned by replacing hydride groups by alkoxy groups. Due to its pyrophoric nature, instability, toxicity, low shelf life and handling problems associated with its reactivity, it has been replaced in the last decade, both at the small-industrial scale and for large-scale reductions by the more convenient related reagent sodium bis (2-methoxyethoxy)aluminium hydride, which exhibits similar reactivity but with higher safety, easier handling and better economics.

LAH is most commonly used for the reduction of esters and carboxylic acids to primary alcohols; prior to the advent of LAH this was a difficult conversion involving sodium metal in boiling ethanol (the Bouveault-Blanc reduction). Aldehydes and ketones can also be reduced to alcohols by LAH, but this is usually done using milder reagents such as Na[BH_{4}]; α, β-unsaturated ketones are reduced to allylic alcohols. When epoxides are reduced using LAH, the reagent attacks the less hindered end of the epoxide, usually producing a secondary or tertiary alcohol. Epoxycyclohexanes are reduced to give axial alcohols preferentially.

Partial reduction of acid chlorides to give the corresponding aldehyde product cannot proceed via LAH, since the latter reduces all the way to the primary alcohol. Instead, the milder lithium tri-tert-butoxyaluminum hydride, which reacts significantly faster with the acid chloride than with the aldehyde, must be used. For example, when isovaleric acid is treated with thionyl chloride to give isovaleroyl chloride, it can then be reduced via lithium tri-tert-butoxyaluminum hydride to give isovaleraldehyde in 65% yield.

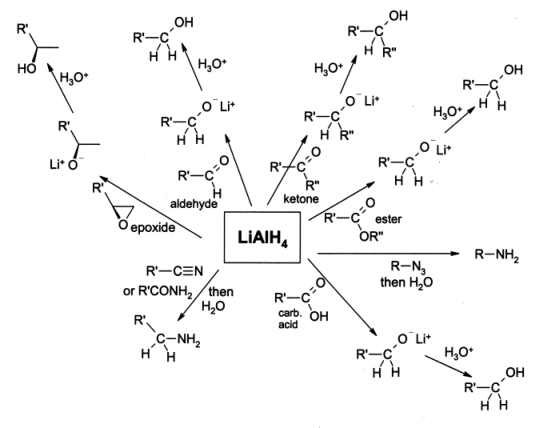

Lithium aluminium hydride also reduces alkyl halides to alkanes. Alkyl iodides react the fastest, followed by alkyl bromides and then alkyl chlorides. Primary halides are the most reactive followed by secondary halides. Tertiary halides react only in certain cases.

Lithium aluminium hydride does not reduce simple alkenes or arenes. Alkynes are reduced only if an alcohol group is nearby, and alkenes are reduced in the presence of catalytic TiCl_{4}. It was observed that the LiAlH_{4} reduces the double bond in the N-allylamides.

=== Inorganic chemistry ===
LAH is used to prepare main group and transition metal hydrides from the corresponding metal halides. It also reacts with a variety weakly protic reagents, evolving hydrogen:

LiAlH_{4} + 4 NH_{3} → Li[Al(NH_{2})_{4}] + 4 H_{2}

=== Hydrogen storage ===
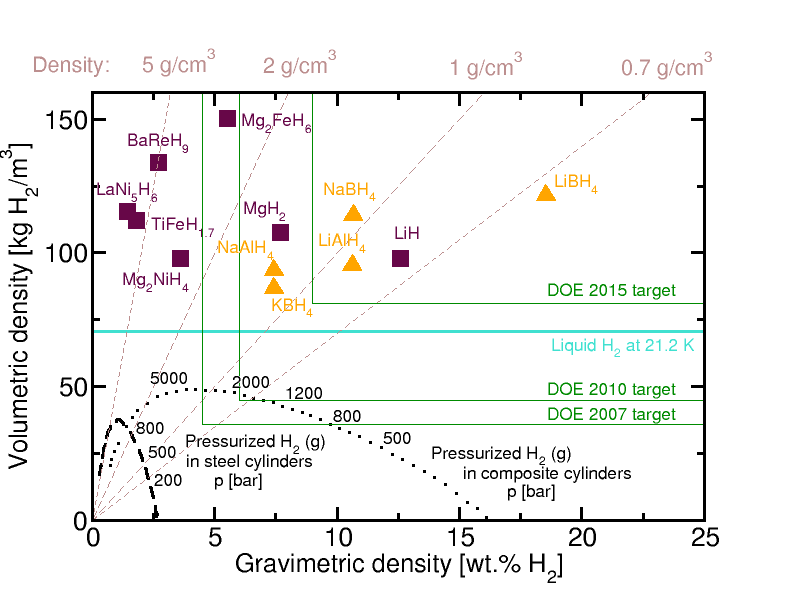
Volumetric and gravimetric hydrogen storage densities of different hydrogen storage methods. Metal hydrides are represented with squares and complex hydrides with triangles (including LiAlH_{4}). Reported values for hydrides are excluding tank weight. DOE FreedomCAR targets are including tank weight.

LiAlH_{4} contains 10.6 wt% hydrogen, thereby making LAH a potential hydrogen storage medium for future fuel cell-powered vehicles. The high hydrogen content, as well as the discovery of reversible hydrogen storage in Ti-doped NaAlH_{4}, sparked research. A substantial research effort has been devoted to accelerating the decomposition kinetics by catalytic doping and by ball milling. Due to its high stability of LiH, the hydrogen storage capacity is lowered to 7.96 wt%. Recycling these products back to LiAlH_{4} requires an extremely high hydrogen pressure in excess of 10000 bar. Cycling only Li_{3}AlH_{6} translates to 5.6 wt% hydrogen in a single step (vs. two steps for NaAlH_{4} which stores about the same amount of hydrogen).

=== Other tetrahydridoaluminiumates ===
A variety of salts analogous to LAH are known. NaH can be used to efficiently produce sodium aluminium hydride (NaAlH_{4}) by metathesis in THF:

LiAlH_{4} + NaH → NaAlH_{4} + LiH

Potassium aluminium hydride (KAlH_{4}) can be produced similarly in diglyme as a solvent:

LiAlH_{4} + KH → KAlH_{4} + LiH

The reverse, i.e., production of LAH from either sodium aluminium hydride or potassium aluminium hydride can be achieved by reaction with LiCl or lithium hydride in diethyl ether or THF:

NaAlH_{4} + LiCl → LiAlH_{4} + NaCl
KAlH_{4} + LiCl → LiAlH_{4} + KCl

"Magnesium alanate" (Mg(AlH_{4})_{2}) arises similarly using MgBr_{2}:

2 LiAlH_{4} + MgBr_{2} → Mg(AlH_{4})_{2} + 2 LiBr

Red-Al (or SMEAH, NaAlH_{2}(OC_{2}H_{4}OCH_{3})_{2}) is synthesized by reacting sodium aluminum tetrahydride (NaAlH_{4}) and 2-methoxyethanol:

== Safety ==
=== Handling ===
The highly reducing and pyrophoric nature of LAH requires special handling techniques to avoid its exposure to sources of ignition, moisture, and ambient oxygen. The use of a fume hood or dry box under an inert atmosphere is recommended for any work with large amounts of LAH. It is recommended that a class D fire extinguisher or dry sand is on standby in case of a fire, as other classes of extinguisher may intensify the fire if used.

=== Lab accidents ===
Due to the widespread use and hazardous character of LAH, it has been the cause of many lab accidents. Lab fires related to this compound have been the result of grinding, runaway reactions, improper storage, and spontaneous ignition. Often, these fires are made worse by the erroneous use of CO2 fire extinguishers, which can fuel LAH fires.
The use of LAH to reduce fluorinated compounds has also caused multiple lab explosions. These explosions result from LAH creating a complex with the fluorinated compound, these complexes have been found to be heat and shock sensitive explosives.

== See also ==
- Hydride
- Sodium borohydride
- Sodium hydride
