= Sodium aluminium hydride =

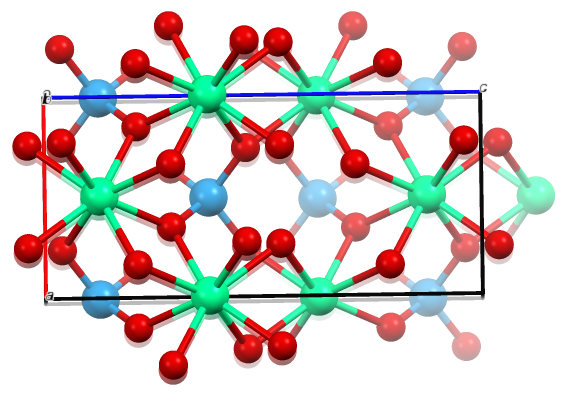

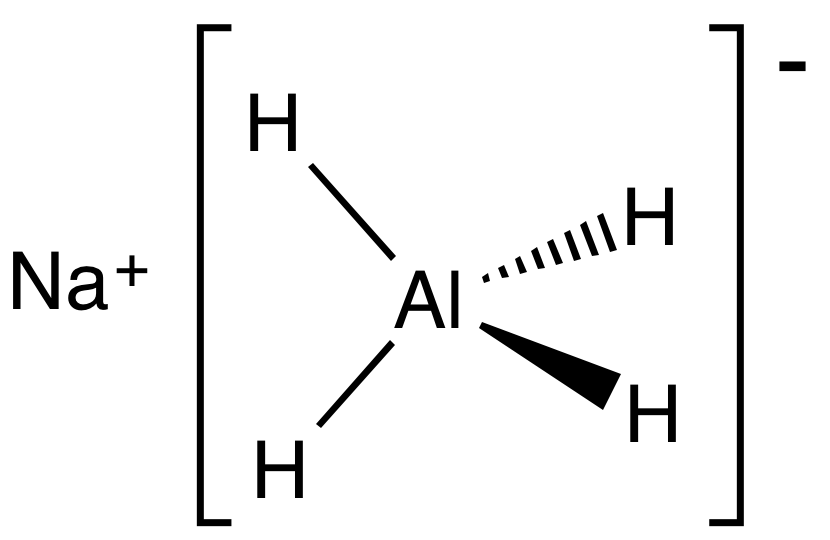

Names
- IUPAC name Sodium aluminium hydride
- Other names Sodium tetrahydroaluminate

Identifiers
CAS Number	13770-96-2
3D model (JSmol)	Interactive image
ChEBI	CHEBI:30141
ChemSpider	24473
ECHA InfoCard	100.033.986
EC Number	237-400-1
Gmelin Reference	91541
PubChem CID	26266
UN number	2835
CompTox Dashboard (EPA)	DTXSID1051696
- InChI: InChI=1S/Al.Na.4H/q-1;+1;;;;
- SMILES: [Na+].[AlH4-]

Properties
Chemical formula	AlH_{4}Na
Molar mass	54.003 g·mol^{−1}
Appearance	White or gray crystalline solid
Density	1.24 g/cm^{3}
Melting point	178 °C (352 °F; 451 K)
Solubility	soluble in THF (16 g/100 mL at room temperature)

Hazards
- GHS labelling
Pictograms	(GHS02: Flammable) (GHS05: Corrosive) (GHS07: Exclamation mark)
NFPA 704 (fire diamond)	3 2 2 W
Flash point	−22 °C; −7 °F; 251 K
Autoignition temperature	185 °C (365 °F; 458 K)
- Lethal dose or concentration (LD, LC)
LD_{50} (median dose)	740 mg/kg (oral, mouse)
Safety data sheet (SDS)	Fisher Scientific
- Except where otherwise noted, data are given for materials in their standard state (at 25 °C [77 °F], 100 kPa). verify (what is ?) Infobox references

Sodium aluminium hydride or sodium alanate is an inorganic compound with the chemical formula NaAlH_{4}. It is a white solid that dissolves in tetrahydrofuran (THF), but not in diethyl ether or hydrocarbons. It has been evaluated as an agent for the reversible storage of hydrogen and it is used as a reagent for the chemical synthesis of organic compounds. Similar to lithium aluminium hydride, it is a salt consisting of separated sodium cations and tetrahedral AlH^{−}_{4} anions.

== Structure, preparation, and reactions ==
Sodium tetrahydroaluminate adopts the structure of (is isostructural with) calcium tungstate. As such, the tetrahedral AlH^{−}_{4} centers are linked with eight-coordinate Na+ cations. The compound is prepared from the elements under high pressures of H_{2} at 200 °C using triethylaluminium catalyst:

Na + Al + 2 H_{2} → NaAlH_{4}

As a suspension in diethyl ether, it reacts with lithium chloride to give the popular reagent lithium aluminium hydride:

LiCl + NaAlH_{4} → LiAlH_{4} + NaCl

The compound reacts rapidly, even violently, with protic reagents, such as water, as described in this idealized equation:

4 H_{2}O + NaAlH_{4} → "NaAl(OH)_{4}" + 4 H_{2}

== Applications ==
=== Hydrogen storage ===
Sodium alanate has been explored for hydrogen storage in hydrogen tanks. The relevant reactions are:

3 NaAlH_{4} → Na_{3}AlH_{6}+ 2 Al + 3 H_{2}
Na_{3}AlH_{6} → 3 NaH + Al + 3/2 H_{2}

Sodium tetrahydroaluminate can release up to 7.4 wt % of hydrogen when heated at 200 °C (392 °F). Absorption can be slow, with several minutes being required to fill a tank. Both release and uptake are catalysed by titanium.

=== Reagent in organic chemistry ===
Sodium aluminium hydride is a strong reducing agent, very similar in reactivity to lithium aluminium hydride (LAH) and, to some extent, diisobutylaluminium hydride (DIBAL) in organic reactions. It is much more powerful reducing agent than sodium borohydride due to the weaker and more polar Al-H bond compared to the B-H bond. Like LAH, it reduces esters to alcohols.

== Safety ==
Sodium aluminium hydride is highly flammable. It does not react in dry air at room temperature but is very sensitive to moisture. It ignites or explodes on contact with water.

== See also ==
- Complex metal hydride
