= Hydrogenography =

Hydrogenography is a combinatorial method based on the observation of optical changes on the metal surface by hydrogen absorption. The method allows the examination of thousands of combinations of alloy samples in a single batch.

== History ==
In the 1996 report of the method, thin films were coated with yttrium and lanthanum topped with a layer of palladium for the diffusion of hydrogen. The rate of absorption of hydrogen resulted in typical optical properties. In the 2008 report magnesium, titanium and nickel are eroded and sputtering deposited in different ratios onto a transparent film in a thin layer of 100 nanometres following exposure to hydrogen in different amounts resulting in optical differences.

== See also ==
- Hydrogen embrittlement
- Hydrogen storage
