= Dimethoxyethane =

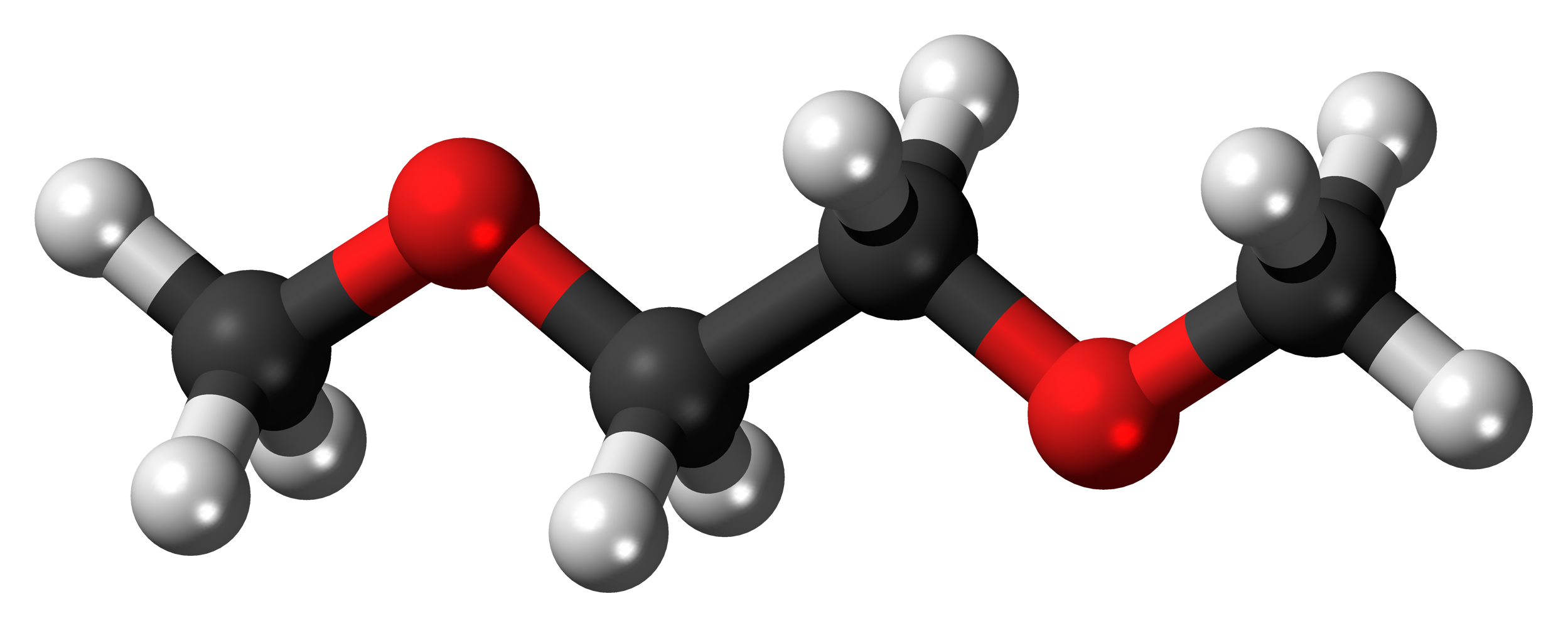

Names
- Preferred IUPAC name 1,2-Dimethoxyethane
- Other names Ethane-1,2-diyl dimethyl ether DME; Glyme; Ethylene glycol dimethyl ether Monoglyme; Dimethyl glycol Dimethyl cellosolve

Identifiers
CAS Number	110-71-4
3D model (JSmol)	Interactive image
Abbreviations	DME
Beilstein Reference	1209237
ChEBI	CHEBI:42263
ChemSpider	13836589
ECHA InfoCard	100.003.451
EC Number	203-794-9
Gmelin Reference	1801
PubChem CID	8071
RTECS number	KI1451000
UNII	GXS24JF5IW
CompTox Dashboard (EPA)	DTXSID2027838 DTXSID0025286, DTXSID2027838
- InChI: InChI=1S/C4H10O2/c1-5-3-4-6-2/h3-4H2,1-2H3 Key: XTHFKEDIFFGKHM-UHFFFAOYSA-N; InChI=1S/C4H10O2/c1-5-3-4-6-2/h3-4H2,1-2H3 Key: XTHFKEDIFFGKHM-UHFFFAOYSA-N
- SMILES: COCCOC

Properties
Chemical formula	C_{4}H_{10}O_{2}
Molar mass	90.122 g·mol^{−1}
Appearance	Colorless liquid
Density	0.8683 g/cm^{3}
Melting point	−69 °C (−92 °F; 204 K)
Boiling point	85 °C (185 °F; 358 K)
Solubility in water	miscible

Hazards
- GHS labelling
Pictograms	(GHS02: Flammable) (GHS07: Exclamation mark) (GHS08: Health hazard)
Signal word	Danger
Hazard statements	H225, H332, H360FD
Precautionary statements	P201, P202, P210, P233, P240, P241, P242, P243, P261, P271, P280, P281, P303+P361+P353, P304+P312, P304+P340, P308+P313, P312, P370+P378, P403+P235, P405, P501
NFPA 704 (fire diamond)	2 2 0
Flash point	−2 °C (28 °F; 271 K)

Related compounds
Related Ethers	Dimethoxymethane
Related compounds	Ethylene glycol 1,4-Dioxane; Diethylene glycol dimethyl ether
- Except where otherwise noted, data are given for materials in their standard state (at 25 °C [77 °F], 100 kPa). verify (what is ?) Infobox references

Dimethoxyethane, also known as glyme, monoglyme, dimethyl glycol, ethylene glycol dimethyl ether, dimethyl cellosolve, and DME, is a colorless, aprotic, and liquid ether that is used as a solvent, especially in batteries. Dimethoxyethane is miscible with water.

== Production ==
Monoglyme is produced industrially by the reaction of dimethylether with ethylene oxide:

CH_{3}OCH_{3} + CH_{2}CH_{2}O → CH_{3}OCH_{2}CH_{2}OCH_{3}

== Applications as solvent and ligand ==
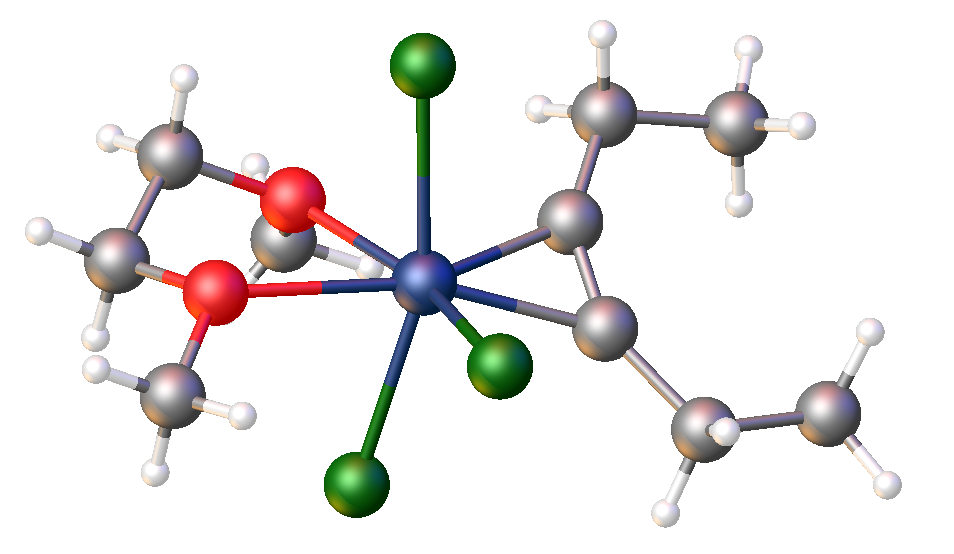
Structure of the coordination complex NbCl_{3}(dimethoxyethane)(3-hexyne).

Together with a high-permittivity solvent (e.g. propylene carbonate), dimethoxyethane is used as the low-viscosity component of the solvent for electrolytes of lithium batteries. In the laboratory, DME is used as a coordinating solvent.

Dimethoxyethane is often used as a higher-boiling-point alternative to diethyl ether and tetrahydrofuran. Dimethoxyethane acts as a bidentate ligand for some metal cations. It is therefore often used in organometallic chemistry. Grignard reactions and hydride reductions are typical application. It is also suitable for palladium-catalyzed reactions including Suzuki reactions and Stille couplings. Dimethoxyethane is also a good solvent for oligo- and polysaccharides.

Sodium naphthalide dissolved in dimethoxyethane is used as a PTFE etching solution that removes fluorine atoms from the surface, which get replaced by oxygen, hydrogen, and water. This physically etches the surface as well to prepare the surface for better adhesion.
