= Hydrogen storage =

Methods of storing hydrogen for later use

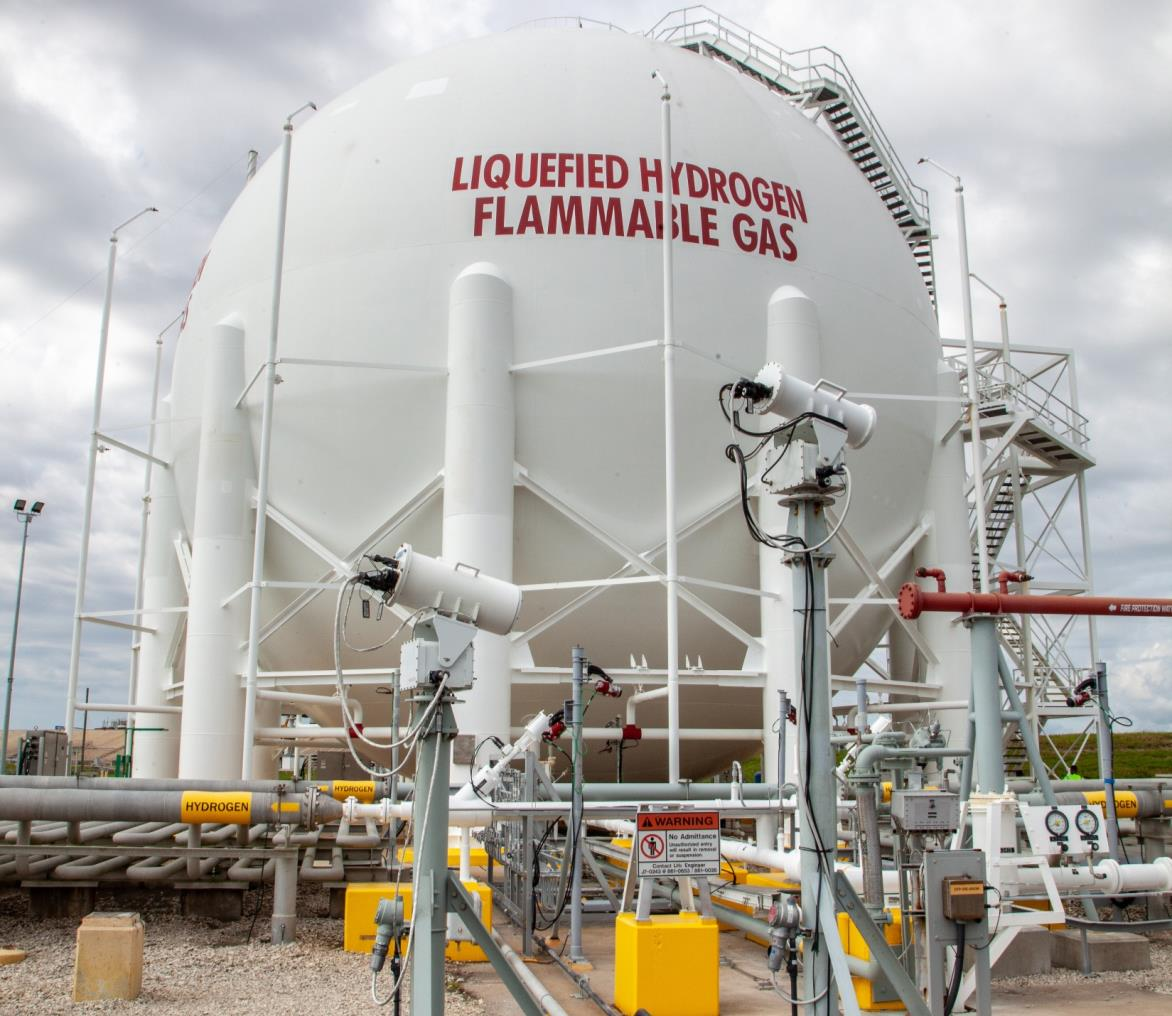
Liquid hydrogen Tank at NASA Kennedy Space Center

Several methods exist for storing hydrogen. These include mechanical approaches such as using high pressures and low temperatures, or employing chemical compounds that release H_{2} upon demand. While large amounts of hydrogen are produced by various industries, it is mostly consumed at the site of production, notably for the synthesis of ammonia. For many years hydrogen has been stored as compressed gas or cryogenic liquid, and transported as such in cylinders, tubes, and cryogenic tanks for use in industry or as propellant in space programs. The overarching challenge is the very low boiling point of H_{2}: it boils around 20.268 K (−252.882 °C or −423.188 °F). Achieving such low temperatures requires expending significant energy.

Although molecular hydrogen has very high energy density on a mass basis, partly because of its low molecular weight, as a gas at ambient conditions it has very low energy density by volume. If it is to be used as fuel stored on board a vehicle, pure hydrogen gas must be stored in an energy-dense form to provide sufficient driving range. Because hydrogen is the smallest molecule, it easily escapes from containers. Its effective 100-year global warming potential (GWP100) is estimated to be 11.6 ± 2.8.

== Established technologies ==
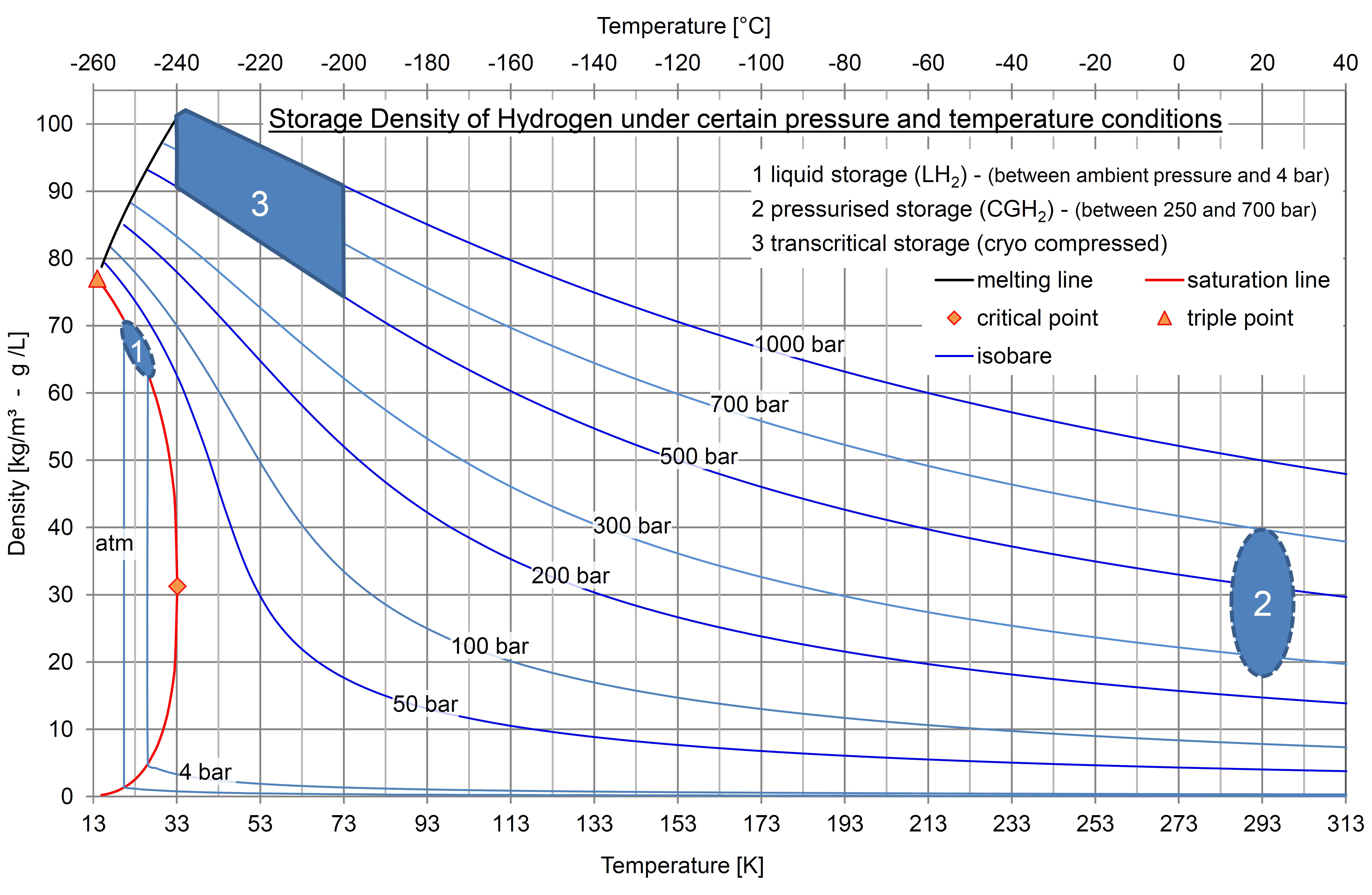
Net storage density of hydrogen

=== Compressed hydrogen ===
Compressed hydrogen is a storage form whereby hydrogen gas is kept under pressures to increase the storage density. Compressed hydrogen in hydrogen tanks at 350 bar (5,000 psi) and 700 bar (10,000 psi) are used for hydrogen tank systems in vehicles, based on type IV carbon-composite technology. Car manufacturers including Honda and Nissan have been developing this solution.

=== Liquefied hydrogen ===
Liquid hydrogen tanks for cars, producing for example the BMW Hydrogen 7. Japan has a liquid hydrogen (LH2) storage site in Kobe port. Hydrogen is liquefied by reducing its temperature to −253 °C, similar to liquefied natural gas (LNG) which is stored at −162 °C. A potential efficiency loss of only 12.79% can be achieved, or 4.26 kW⋅h/kg out of 33.3 kW⋅h/kg.

== Chemical storage ==
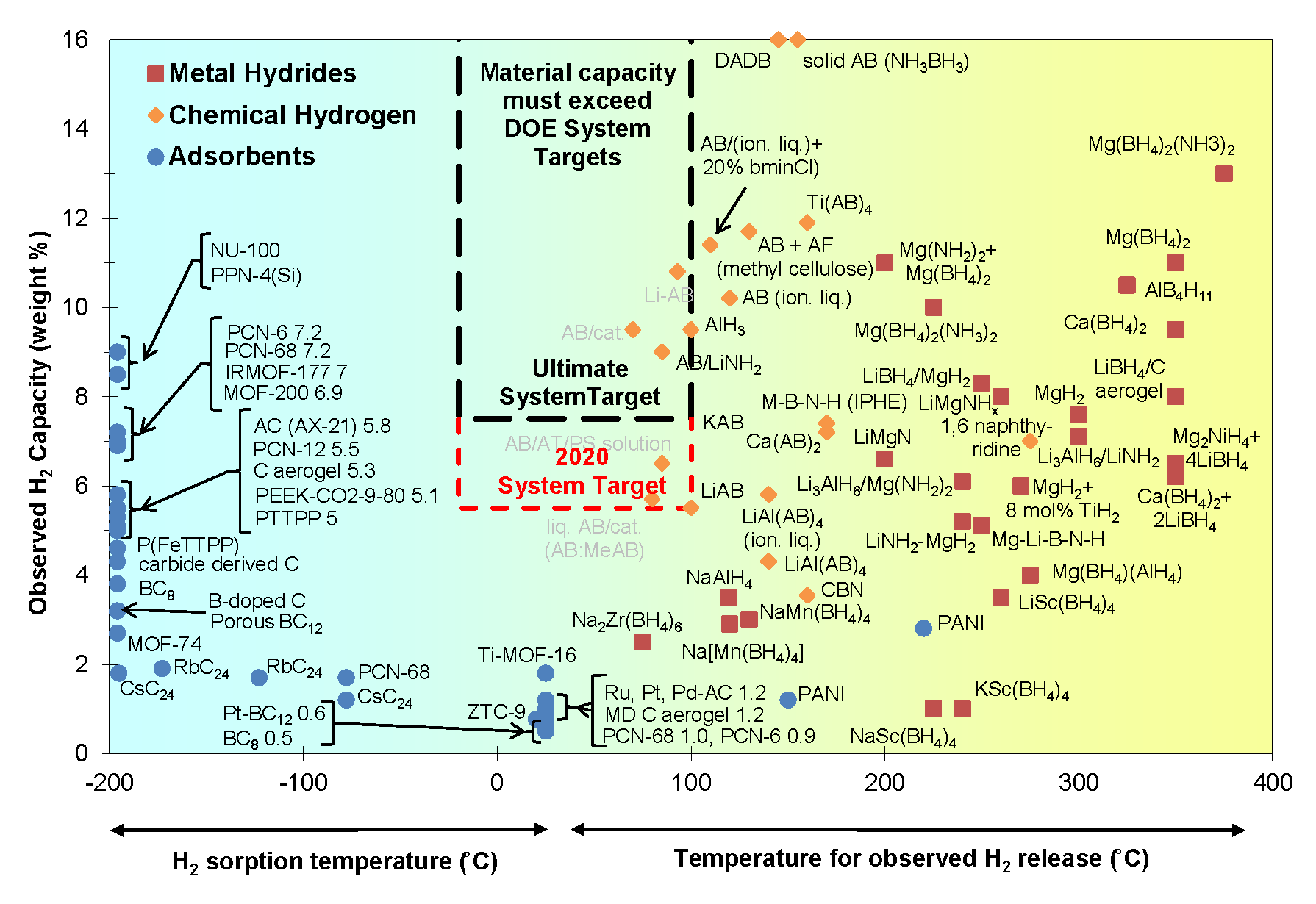
Hydrogen gravimetric capacity of proposed storage materials for hydrogen fuel as a function of hydrogen release temperature. The targets have since been lowered.

Chemical storage could offer high storage performance due to the high storage densities. For example, supercritical hydrogen at 30 °C and 500 bar only has a density of 15.0 mol/L while methanol has a hydrogen density of 49.5 mol H_{2}/L methanol and saturated dimethyl ether at 30 °C and 7 bar has a density of 42.1 mol H_{2}/L dimethyl ether.

Regeneration of storage material is problematic. A large number of chemical storage systems have been investigated. H_{2} release can be induced by hydrolysis reactions or catalyzed dehydrogenation reactions. Illustrative storage compounds are hydrocarbons, boron hydrides, ammonia, and alane etc. A most promising chemical approach is electrochemical hydrogen storage, as the release of hydrogen can be controlled by the applied electricity. Most of the materials listed below can be directly used for electrochemical hydrogen storage.

Nanomaterials, particularly those produced by ball mill and severe plastic deformation, offer an alternative that overcomes the two major barriers of bulk materials, rate of sorption and activation. High-entropy alloy materials such as TiZrCrMnFeNi also show advantages of fast and reversible hydrogen storage at room temperature with good storage capacity for stationary applications.

Enhancement of sorption kinetics and storage capacity can be improved through nanomaterial-based catalyst doping, as shown in the work of the Clean Energy Research Center in the University of South Florida. This research group studied LiBH_{4} doped with nickel nanoparticles and analyzed the weight loss and release temperature of the different species. They observed that an increasing amount of nanocatalyst lowers the release temperature by approximately 20 °C and increases the weight loss of the material by 2-3%. The optimum amount of Ni particles was found to be 3 mol%, for which the temperature was within the limits established (around 100 °C) and the weight loss was notably greater than the undoped species.

The rate of hydrogen sorption improves at the nanoscale due to the short diffusion distance in comparison to bulk materials. They also have favorable surface-area-to-volume ratio.

The release temperature of a material is defined as the temperature at which the desorption process begins. The energy or temperature to induce release affects the cost of any chemical storage strategy. If the hydrogen is bound too weakly, the pressure needed for regeneration is high, thereby cancelling any energy savings. The target for onboard hydrogen fuel systems is roughly <100 °C for release and <700 bar for recharge (20–60 kJ/mol H_{2}). A modified van 't Hoff equation, relates temperature and partial pressure of hydrogen during the desorption process. The modifications to the standard equation are related to size effects at the nanoscale.

$\ln(p_\mathrm{H_\mathrm{2}}) = \frac{\Delta H(r)}{RT}+\frac{3 V_\mathrm{m} \gamma}{rRT}+\frac{\Delta S(r)}{R}$

Where p_{H_{2}} is the partial pressure of hydrogen, ΔH is the enthalpy of the sorption process (exothermic), ΔS is the change in entropy, R is the ideal gas constant, T is the temperature in Kelvin, V_{m} is the molar volume of the metal, r is the radius of the nanoparticle and γ is the surface free energy of the particle.

From the above relation we see that the enthalpy and entropy change of desorption processes depend on the radius of the nanoparticle. Moreover, a new term is included that takes into account the specific surface area of the particle and it can be mathematically proven that a decrease in particle radius leads to a decrease in the release temperature for a given partial pressure.

=== Hydrogenation of CO_{2} ===
Hydrogenation of CO_{2} to methanol has been evaluated for hydrogen storage. Barriers of CO_{2} hydrogenation includes purification of captured CO_{2}, H_{2} source from splitting water and energy inputs for hydrogenation. For industrial applications, CO_{2} is often converted to methanol. Until now, much progress has been made for CO_{2} to C1 molecules. However, CO_{2} to high value molecules still face many roadblocks and the future of CO_{2} hydrogenation depends on the advancement of catalytic technologies.

=== Metal hydrides ===
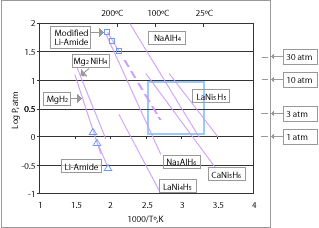
Metal hydride hydrogen storage

Metal hydrides, such as MgH_{2}, NaAlH_{4}, LiAlH_{4}, LiH, LaNi_{5}H_{6}, TiFeH_{2}, ammonia borane, and palladium hydride represent sources of stored hydrogen. There are three main classes of metal hydrides:

- Inter-metallic Hydrides: exhibit fast kinetics and moderate hydrogen capacities. Such as LaNi_{5}H_{6}, TiFeH_{2}.
- Complex Hydrides: capable of higher hydrogen storage capacities but require catalysts. Such as NaAlH_{4}, LiBH_{4}.
- Lightweight Hydrides: offer high gravimetric hydrogen storage but require high temperatures for desorption. Such as MgH_{2}, CaH_{2}.

Here are the properties of some metal hydrides:

Metal Hydride	H₂ Capacity (wt%)	Absorption Temp (°C)	Desorption Temp (°C)	Applications
LaNi_{5}H_{6}	1.5-2.0	30-60	50-100	Stationary Storage, Fuel Cells
NaAlH_{4}	5.6	100-150	200-250	Solid-State Hydrogen Batteries
MgH_{2}	7.6	300-400	>300	High-Density Hydrogen Storage

Again the persistent problems are the % weight of H_{2} that they carry and the reversibility of the storage process. Some are easy-to-fuel liquids at ambient temperature and pressure, whereas others are solids which could be turned into pellets. These materials have good energy density, although their specific energy is often worse than the leading hydrocarbon fuels.

An alternative method for lowering dissociation temperatures is doping with activators. This strategy has been used for aluminium hydride, but the complex synthesis makes the approach unattractive.

Proposed hydrides for use in a hydrogen economy include simple hydrides of magnesium or transition metals and complex metal hydrides, typically containing sodium, lithium, or calcium and aluminium or boron. Hydrides chosen for storage applications provide low reactivity (high safety) and high hydrogen storage densities. Leading candidates are lithium hydride, sodium borohydride, lithium aluminium hydride and ammonia borane. A French company McPhy Energy is developing the first industrial product, based on magnesium hydride, already sold to some major clients such as Iwatani and ENEL.

Reversible hydrogen storage is exhibited by frustrated Lewis pairs.

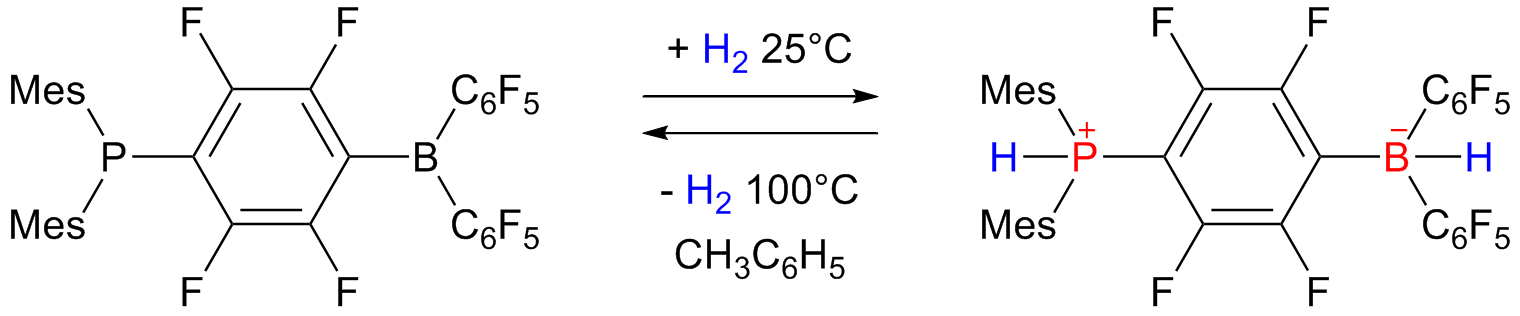
Phosphino borane hydrogenstorage

The phosphino-borane on the left accepts one equivalent of hydrogen at one atmosphere and 25 °C and expels it again by heating to 100 °C. The storage capacity is 0.25 wt%.

=== Aluminium ===
Hydrogen is produced by hydrolysis of aluminium. It was previously believed that, to react with water, aluminium must be stripped of its natural oxide passivation layer, or mixing with gallium (which produces aluminium nanoparticles that allow 90% of the aluminium to react). It has since been demonstrated that efficient reaction is possible by increasing the temperature and pressure of the reaction. The byproduct of the reaction to create hydrogen is aluminium oxide, which can be recycled back into aluminium with the Hall–Héroult process, making the reaction theoretically renewable. Although this requires electrolysis, which consumes a large amount of energy, the energy is then stored in the aluminium (and released when the aluminium is reacted with water).

=== Magnesium ===
Traditional MgH_{2} stores 7.6 wt% hydrogen, but its high desorption temperature (>300 °C) limits applications. Mg-Ti-V nanocomposites can lower the desorption temperature to below 200 °C. Carbon-coordinated MgH_{2} exhibits 80% of improvement on cycling stability over 1000 cycles.

LiBH_{4} + MgH_{2} composites stored about 11 wt% of hydrogen, one of the highest capacities reported. And ammonia borane (H₃NBH₃) releases 12 wt% hydrogen at moderate temperatures (~100–150 °C).

Mg-based hydrogen storage materials include pure Mg, Mg-based alloys, and Mg-based composites. Nonetheless, the inferior hydrogen absorption/desorption kinetics rooting in the overly undue thermodynamic stability of metal hydride make the Mg-based hydrogen storage alloys currently not appropriate for the real applications, and therefore, massive attempts have been dedicated to overcoming these shortages. Some sample preparation methods, such as smelting, powder sintering, diffusion, mechanical alloying, the hydriding combustion synthesis method, surface treatment, and heat treatment, etc., have been broadly employed for altering the dynamic performance and cycle life of Mg-based hydrogen storage alloys. Besides, some intrinsic modification strategies, including alloying, nanostructuring, doping by catalytic additives, and acquiring nanocomposites with other hydrides, etc., have been mainly explored for intrinsically boosting the performance of Mg-based hydrogen storage alloys. Like aluminium, magnesium also reacts with water to produce hydrogen.

Of the primary hydrogen storage alloys progressed formerly, Mg and Mg-based hydrogen storage materials are believed to provide the remarkable possibility of the practical application, on account of the advantages as following: 1) the resource of Mg is plentiful and economical. Mg element exists abundantly and accounts for ≈2.35% of the earth's crust with the rank of the eighth; 2) low density of merely 1.74 g cm-3; 3) superior hydrogen storage capacity. The theoretical hydrogen storage amounts of the pure Mg is 7.6 wt % (weight percent), and the Mg2Ni is 3.6 wt%, respectively.

=== Alanates-based systems ===
Lithium alanate (LiAlH_{4}) was synthesized for the first time in 1947 by dissolution of lithium hydride in an ether solution of aluminium chloride. LiAlH_{4} has a theoretical gravimetric capacity of 10.5 wt %H_{2} and dehydrogenates in the following three steps: 3LiAlH_{4} ↔ Li_{3}AlH_{6} + 3H_{2} + 2Al (423–448 K; 5.3 wt %H_{2}; ∆H = −10 kJ·mol−1 H_{2}); Li_{3}AlH_{6} ↔ 3LiH + Al + 1.5H_{2} (453–493 K; 2.6 wt %H_{2}; ∆H = 25 kJ·mol−1 H_{2}); 3LiH + 3Al ↔ 3LiAl + 3/2H_{2} (>673 K; 2.6 wt %H_{2}; ∆H = 140 kJ·mol−1 H_{2}). The first two steps lead to a total amount of hydrogen released equal to 7.9 wt %, which could be attractive for practical applications, but the working temperatures and the desorption kinetics are still far from the practical targets. Several strategies have been applied in the last few years to overcome these limits, such as ball-milling and catalysts additions.

Potassium Alanate (KAlH_{4}) was first prepared by Ashby et al. by one-step synthesis in toluene, tetrahydrofuran, and diglyme. Concerning the hydrogen absorption and desorption properties, this alanate was only scarcely studied. Morioka et al., by temperature programmed desorption (TPD) analyses, proposed the following dehydrogenation mechanism: 3KAlH_{4} →K_{3}AlH_{6} + 2Al + 3H_{2} (573 K, ∆H = 55 kJ·mol−1 H_{2}; 2.9 wt %H_{2}), K_{3}AlH_{6} → 3KH + Al + 3/2H_{2} (613 K, ∆H = 70 kJ·mol−1 H_{2}; 1.4 wt %H_{2}), 3KH → 3K + 3/2H_{2} (703 K, 1.4 wt %H_{2}). These reactions were demonstrated reversible without catalysts addition at relatively low hydrogen pressure and temperatures. The addition of TiCl_{3} was found to decrease the working temperature of the first dehydrogenation step of 50 K, but no variations were recorded for the last two reaction steps.

=== Organic hydrogen carriers ===
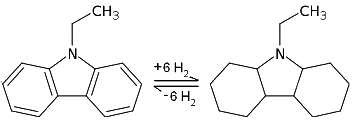
Reversible hydrogenation of N-ethylcarbazole.

Unsaturated organic compounds can store huge amounts of hydrogen. These Liquid Organic Hydrogen Carriers (LOHC) are hydrogenated for storage and dehydrogenated again when the energy/hydrogen is needed. Using LOHCs, relatively high gravimetric storage densities can be reached (about 6 wt-%) and the overall energy efficiency is higher than for other chemical storage options such as producing methane from the hydrogen. Both hydrogenation and dehydrogenation of LOHCs requires catalysts. It was demonstrated that replacing hydrocarbons by hetero-atoms, like N, O etc. improves reversible de/hydrogenation properties.

==== Cycloalkanes ====
Cycloalkanes have relatively high hydrogen capacity (6-8 wt %). Heterocyclic aromatic compounds (or N-Heterocycles) are also appropriate for this task. but many others do exist. Dibenzyltoluene, which is already used as a heat transfer fluid in industry, was identified as potential LOHC. With a wide liquid range between -39 °C (melting point) and 390 °C (boiling point) and a hydrogen storage density of 6.2 wt% dibenzyltoluene is ideally suited as LOHC material. Formic acid has been suggested as a promising hydrogen storage material with a 4.4wt% hydrogen capacity.

Cycloalkanes reported as LOHC include cyclohexane, methyl-cyclohexane and decalin. The dehydrogenation of cycloalkanes is highly endothermic (63-69 kJ/mol H_{2}), which means this process requires high temperature. Dehydrogenation of decalin is the most thermodynamically favored among the three cycloalkanes, and methyl-cyclohexane is second because of the presence of the methyl group. The dehydrogenation of cycloalkanes is a mature area. Nickel-, molybdenum-, andcat platinum-based catalysts are established. Coking remains a challenge.

==== N-Heterocycles ====
The temperature required for hydrogenation and dehydrogenation drops significantly for heterocycles vs simple carbocycles. Among all the N-heterocycles, the saturated-unsaturated pair of dodecahydro-N-ethylcarbazole (12H-NEC) and NEC has been considered as a promising candidate for hydrogen storage with a fairly large hydrogen content (5.8wt%). The figure on the top right shows dehydrogenation and hydrogenation of the 12H-NEC and NEC pair. The standard catalyst for NEC to 12H-NEC is Ru and Rh based. The selectivity of hydrogenation can reach 97% at 7 MPa and 130 °C-150 °C. Although N-Heterocyles can optimize the unfavorable thermodynamic properties of cycloalkanes, a lot of issues remain unsolved, such as high cost, high toxicity and kinetic barriers etc.

The imidazolium ionic liquids such alkyl(aryl)-3-methylimidazolium N-bis(trifluoromethanesulfonyl)imidate salts can reversibly add 6–12 hydrogen atoms in the presence of classical Pd/C or Ir0 nanoparticle catalysts and can be used as alternative materials for on-board hydrogen-storage devices. These salts can hold up to 30 g L^{−1} of hydrogen at atmospheric pressure.

==== Formic acid ====
Formic acid is a highly effective hydrogen storage material, although its H_{2} density is low. Carbon monoxide free hydrogen has been generated in a very wide pressure range (1–600 bar). A homogeneous catalytic system based on water-soluble ruthenium catalysts selectively decompose HCOOH into H_{2} and CO_{2} in aqueous solution. This catalytic system overcomes the limitations of other catalysts (e.g. poor stability, limited catalytic lifetimes, formation of CO) for the decomposition of formic acid making it a viable hydrogen storage material. And the co-product of this decomposition, carbon dioxide, can be used as hydrogen vector by hydrogenating it back to formic acid in a second step. The catalytic hydrogenation of CO_{2} has long been studied and efficient procedures have been developed. Formic acid contains 53 g L^{−1} hydrogen at room temperature and atmospheric pressure. By weight, pure formic acid stores 4.3 wt% hydrogen. Pure formic acid is a liquid with a flash point 69 °C (cf. gasoline −40 °C, ethanol 13 °C). 85% formic acid is not flammable.

=== Ammonia and related compounds ===
==== Ammonia ====
Ammonia (NH_{3}) releases H_{2} in an appropriate catalytic reformer. Ammonia provides high hydrogen storage densities as a liquid with mild pressurization and cryogenic constraints: It can also be stored as a liquid at room temperature and pressure when mixed with water. Ammonia is the second most commonly produced chemical in the world and a large infrastructure for making, transporting, and distributing ammonia exists. Ammonia can be reformed to produce hydrogen with no harmful waste, or can mix with existing fuels and under the right conditions burn efficiently. Since there is no carbon in ammonia, no carbon by-products are produced; thereby making this possibility a "carbon neutral" option for the future. Pure ammonia burns poorly at the atmospheric pressures found in natural gas fired water heaters and stoves. Under compression in an automobile engine it is a suitable fuel for slightly modified gasoline engines. Ammonia is a suitable alternative fuel because it has 18.6 MJ/kg energy density at NTP and carbon-free combustion byproducts.

Ammonia has several challenges to widespread adaption as a hydrogen storage material. Ammonia is a toxic gas with a potent odor at standard temperature and pressure. Additionally, advances in the efficiency and scalability of ammonia decomposition are needed for commercial viability, as fuel cell membranes are highly sensitive to residual ammonia and current decomposition techniques have low yield rates. A variety of transition metals can be used to catalyze the ammonia decomposition reaction, the most effective being ruthenium. This catalysis works through chemisorption, where the adsorption energy of N_{2} is less than the reaction energy of dissociation. Hydrogen purification can be achieved in several ways. Hydrogen can be separated from unreacted ammonia using a permeable, hydrogen-selective membrane. It can also be purified through the adsorption of ammonia, which can be selectively trapped due to its polarity.

In September 2005 chemists from the Technical University of Denmark announced a method of storing hydrogen in the form of ammonia saturated into a salt tablet. They claim it will be an inexpensive and safe storage method.

===== Positive attributes of Ammonia =====
- High theoretical energy density
- Wide spread availability
- Large scale commercial production
- Benign decomposition pathway to H_{2} and N_{2}

===== Negative attributes of Ammonia =====
- Toxicity
- Corrosive
- High decomposition temperature leading to efficiency loss

==== Hydrazine ====
Hydrazine breaks down in the cell to form nitrogen and hydrogen. Silicon hydrides and germanium hydrides are also candidates of hydrogen storage materials, as they can subject to energetically favored reaction to form covalently bonded dimers with loss of a hydrogen molecule.

==== Amine boranes ====
Prior to 1980, several compounds were investigated for hydrogen storage including complex borohydrides, or aluminohydrides, and ammonium salts. These hydrides have an upper theoretical hydrogen yield limited to about 8.5% by weight. Amongst the compounds that contain only B, N, and H (both positive and negative ions), representative examples include: amine boranes, boron hydride ammoniates, hydrazine-borane complexes, and ammonium octahydrotriborates or tetrahydroborates. Of these, amine boranes (and especially ammonia borane) have been extensively investigated as hydrogen carriers. During the 1970s and 1980s, the U.S. Army and Navy funded efforts aimed at developing hydrogen/deuterium gas-generating compounds for use in the HF/DF and HCl chemical lasers, and gas dynamic lasers. Earlier hydrogen gas-generating formulations used amine boranes and their derivatives. Ignition of the amine borane(s) forms boron nitride (BN) and hydrogen gas. In addition to ammonia borane (H_{3}BNH_{3}), other gas-generators include diborane diammoniate, H_{2}B(NH_{3})_{2}BH_{4}.

== Physical storage ==
In this case hydrogen remains in physical forms, i.e., as gas, supercritical fluid, adsorbate, or molecular inclusions. Theoretical limitations and experimental results are considered concerning the volumetric and gravimetric capacity of glass microvessels, microporous, and nanoporous media, as well as safety and refilling-time demands. Because hydrogen is the smallest molecule, there are concerns that it may leak easily from containers and during transfer from container to container; however some studies have found hydrogen to have similar leakage rates to natural gas. While it does not directly contribute to radiative forcing, hydrogen is estimated to have an effective 100-year global warming potential of 11.6 ± 2.8 due to its impact on processes such as atmospheric methane oxidation and tropospheric ozone production.

=== Zeolites ===
Zeolites are microporous and highly crystalline aluminosilicate materials. As they exhibit cage and tunnel structures, they offer the potential for the encapsulation of non-polar gases such as H_{2}. In this system, hydrogen is physisorbed on the surface of the zeolite pores through a mechanism of adsorption that involves hydrogen being forced into the pores under pressure and low temperature. Therefore, similar to other porous materials, its hydrogen storage capacity depends on the BET surface area, pore volume, the interaction of molecular hydrogen with the internal surfaces of the micropores, and working conditions such as pressure and temperature.

Channel diameter is also one of the parameters determining this capacity, especially at high pressure. In this case, an effective material should exhibit a large pore volume and a channel diameter close to the kinetic diameter of the hydrogen molecule (d_{H}=2.89 Å).

Table below shows the hydrogen uptake of several zeolites at liquid nitrogen temperature (77K):

H_{2} uptake of several high surface area zeolites
Zeolite	Framework Type (IZA Code)	Pressure (bar)	H_{2} Uptake (wt%)	BET Surface Area (m2/g)
NaY (Si/Al = 2.4)	FAU	0.57	0.37	
HY (Si/Al = 2.7)	FAU	0.95	0.56	
MCM-41		1	0.58	1017
H-ZSM-5 (Si/Al = 40)	MFI	0.92	0.71	418
H-SAPO-34	CHA	0.92	1.09	547
H-CHA (Si/Al = 2.1)	CHA	0.92	1.10	490
H-SSZ-13 (Si/Al = 11.6)	CHA	0.92	1.28	638
NaA	LTA	0.93	1.21	
LiX (Si/Al = 1.4)	FAU	0.60	0.88	
NaX (Si/Al = 1.05)	FAU	0.61	1.22	
CaX (Si/Al = 1.4)	FAU	1.01	1.25	669
Li-LSX (Si/Al = 1.0)	FAU	1.01	1.50	717
Na-LSX (Si/Al = 1.0)	FAU	1.01	1.46	642
K-LSX (Si/Al = 1.0)	FAU	1.01	1.33	570

=== Porous or layered carbon ===
Activated carbons are highly porous amorphous carbon materials with high apparent surface area. Hydrogen physisorption can be increased in these materials by increasing the apparent surface area and optimizing pore diameter to around 7 Å. These materials are of particular interest due to the fact that they can be made from waste materials, such as cigarette butts which have shown great potential as precursor materials for high-capacity hydrogen storage materials.

Graphene can store hydrogen efficiently. The H_{2} adds to the double bonds giving graphane. The hydrogen is released upon heating to 450 °C.

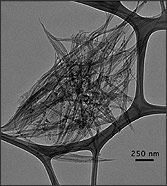
Carbon nanotubes

Hydrogen carriers based on nanostructured carbon (such as carbon buckyballs and nanotubes) have been proposed. However, hydrogen content amounts up to ≈3.0-7.0 wt% at 77K which is far from the value set by US Department of Energy (6 wt% at nearly ambient conditions).

To realize carbon materials as effective hydrogen storage technologies, carbon nanotubes (CNTs) have been doped with MgH_{2}. The metal hydride has proven to have a theoretical storage capacity (7.6 wt%) that fulfills the United States Department of Energy requirement of 6 wt%, but has limited practical applications due to its high release temperature. The proposed mechanism involves the creation of fast diffusion channels by CNTs within the MgH_{2} lattice. Fullerene substances are other carbonaceous nanomaterials that have been tested for hydrogen storage in this center. Fullerene molecules are composed of a C_{60} close-caged structure, that allows for hydrogenation of the double bonded carbons leading to a theoretical C_{60}H_{60} isomer with a hydrogen content of 7.7 wt%. However, the release temperature in these systems is high (600 °C).

=== Metal–organic frameworks ===
Metal–organic frameworks represent another class of synthetic porous materials that store hydrogen and energy at the molecular level. MOFs are highly crystalline inorganic-organic hybrid structures that contain metal clusters or ions (secondary building units) as nodes and organic ligands as linkers. When guest molecules (solvent) occupying the pores are removed during solvent exchange and heating under vacuum, porous structure of MOFs can be achieved without destabilizing the frame and hydrogen molecules will be adsorbed onto the surface of the pores by physisorption. Compared to traditional zeolites and porous carbon materials, MOFs have very high number of pores and surface area which allow higher hydrogen uptake in a given volume.

==== Factors influencing hydrogen storage ability ====
Temperature, pressure and composition of MOFs can influence their hydrogen storage ability. The adsorption capacity of MOFs is lower at higher temperature and higher at lower temperatures. With the rising of temperature, physisorption decreases and chemisorption increases. For MOF-519 and MOF-520, the isosteric heat of adsorption decreased with pressure increase. For MOF-5, both gravimetric and volumetric hydrogen uptake increased with increase in pressure. The total capacity may not be consistent with the usable capacity under pressure swing conditions. For instance, MOF-5 and IRMOF-20, which have the highest total volumetric capacity, show the least usable volumetric capacity. Absorption capacity can be increased by modification of structure. For example, the hydrogen uptake of PCN-68 is higher than PCN-61. Porous aromatic frameworks (PAF-1), which is known as a high surface area material, can achieve a higher surface area by doping.

==== Modification of MOFs ====
There are many different ways to modify MOFs, such as MOF catalysts, MOF hybrids, MOF with metal centers and doping. MOF catalysts have high surface area, porosity and hydrogen storage capacity. However, the active metal centers are low. MOF hybrids have enhanced surface area, porosity, loading capacity and hydrogen storage capacity. Nevertheless, they are not stable and lack active centers. Doping in MOFs can increase hydrogen storage capacity, but there might be steric effect and inert metals have inadequate stability. There might be formation of interconnected pores and low corrosion resistance in MOFs with metal centers, while they might have good binding energy and enhanced stability. These advantages and disadvantages for different kinds of modified MOFs show that MOF hybrids are more promising because of the good controllability in selection of materials for high surface area, porosity and stability.

In 2006, chemists achieved hydrogen storage concentrations of up to 7.5 wt% in MOF-74 at a low temperature of 77 K. MOF NOTT-112 exhibit 10 wt% at 77 bar (1,117 psi) and 77 K with . Most articles about hydrogen storage in MOFs report hydrogen subitptake capacity at a temperature of 77K and a pressure of 1 bar because these conditions are commonly available and the binding energy between hydrogen and the MOF at this temperature is large compared to the thermal vibration energy. Varying several factors such as surface area, pore size, catenation, ligand structure, and sample purity can result in different amounts of hydrogen uptake in MOFs.

NU-1501-Al, an ultraporous metal–organic framework (MOF) has a hydrogen delivery capacity of 14.0% w/w, 46.2 g/litre.

=== Cryo-compressed ===
Cryo-compressed storage of hydrogen is the only technology that meets 2015 DOE targets for volumetric and gravimetric efficiency (see "CcH2" on slide 6 in).

Furthermore, another study has shown that cryo-compression exhibits interesting cost advantages: ownership cost (price per mile) and storage system cost (price per vehicle) are actually the lowest when compared to any other technology (see third row in slide 13 of).

Like liquid storage, cryo-compressed uses cold hydrogen (20.3 K and slightly above) in order to reach a high energy density. However, the main difference is that, when the hydrogen would warm-up due to heat transfer with the environment ("boil off"), the tank is allowed to go to pressures much higher (up to 350 bars versus a couple of bars for liquid storage). As a consequence, it takes more time before the hydrogen has to vent, and in most driving situations, enough hydrogen is used by the car to keep the pressure well below the limit that would require venting.

Consequently, it has been demonstrated that a high driving range could be achieved with a cryo-compressed tank : more than 650 miles (1,050 km) were driven with a full tank mounted on a hydrogen-fueled engine of Toyota Prius.

As of 2010, the BMW Group has started a thorough component and system level validation of cryo-compressed vehicle storage on its way to a commercial product.

=== Clathrate hydrates ===
Hydrogen caged in a clathrate hydrate is stable at very high pressures: pure hydrogen hydrate crystallizes in the cubic structure II at pressures around 200 MPa at 280 K, with a hydrogen storage capacity of about 3.8–5 wt%, depending on cage occupancy. Adding tetrahydrofuran (THF) as a co-guest reduces the required formation pressure by nearly two orders of magnitude, to about 7 MPa at 280 K, because THF preferentially and strongly stabilizes the large cage of the structure. However, because THF occupies the large cage almost exclusively, this comes at a large cost to storage capacity: each small cage can hold at most one hydrogen molecule, limiting the stoichiometric binary hydrate to a theoretical maximum of 1.05 wt% H_{2}, with gas-release measurements showing storage approaching about 1.0 wt% asymptotically as pressure is increased to around 60 MPa. Reducing the THF concentration below stoichiometric was found not to increase storage capacity, contrary to some earlier reports, since THF remains the favored guest for the large cage across the tested range of conditions.

At much higher pressures, hydrogen hydrate transforms from the cage-based clathrate structure into denser filled ice phases. A filled-ice phase with a hydrogen-to-water molar ratio of 2:1, observed experimentally above 40 GPa, has a hydrogen content of 18.3 wt%, exceeding the capacity of both the pure and THF-promoted low-pressure clathrates and comparable to some of the leading complex metal hydrides described above; however, the multi-gigapascal pressures required for its formation make it impractical for conventional onboard storage applications.

=== Van der Waals hydrogen-rich compounds ===
Under high pressure, hydrogen also forms dense, stoichiometric van der Waals compounds with other small molecules. Methane–hydrogen mixtures compressed above about 5 GPa form a series of such compounds, including CH_{4}(H_{2})_{2}, (CH_{4})_{2}H_{2}, and, in hydrogen-rich mixtures, (CH_{4})_{3}(H_{2})_{25}, which contains 51.1 wt% molecular hydrogen (63.4 wt% including the hydrogen bound within the methane molecules) — the highest hydrogen content reported for any known stoichiometric compound.

=== Glass capillary arrays ===
Glass capillary arrays show potential for the safe infusion, storage and controlled release of hydrogen in mobile applications. The C.En technology has achieved the United States Department of Energy (DOE) 2010 targets for on-board hydrogen storage systems. DOE 2015 targets can be achieved using flexible glass capillaries and cryo-compressed method of hydrogen storage.

=== Glass microspheres ===
Hollow glass microspheres (HGM) can be utilized for controlled storage and release of hydrogen. HGMs with a diameter of 1 to 100 μm, a density of 1.0 to 2.0 gm/cc and a porous wall with openings of 10 to 1000 angstroms are considered for hydrogen storage. The advantages of HGMs for hydrogen storage are that they are nontoxic, light, cheap, recyclable, reversible, easily handled at atmospheric conditions, capable of being stored in a tank, and the hydrogen within is non-explosive. Each of these HGMs is capable of containing hydrogen up to 150 MPa without the heaviness and bulk of a large pressurized tank. All of these qualities are favorable in vehicular applications. Beyond these advantages, HGMs are seen as a possible hydrogen solution due to hydrogen diffusivity having a large temperature dependence. At room temperature, the diffusivity is very low, and the hydrogen is trapped in the HGM. The disadvantage of HGMs is that to fill and outgas hydrogen effectively the temperature must be at least 300 °C which significantly increases the operational cost of HGM in hydrogen storage. The high temperature can be partly attributed to glass being an insulator and having a low thermal conductivity; this hinders hydrogen diffusivity, and subsequently a higher temperature is required to achieve the desired storage capacity.

To make this technology more economically viable for commercial use, research is being done to increase the efficiency of hydrogen diffusion through the HGMs. One study done by Dalai et al. sought to increase the thermal conductivity of the HGM through doping the glass with cobalt. In doing so they increased the thermal conductivity from 0.0072 to 0.198 W/m-K at 10 wt% Co. Increases in hydrogen adsorption though were only seen up to 2 wt% Co (0.103 W/m-K) as the metal oxide began to cover pores in the glass shell. This study concluded with a hydrogen storage capacity of 3.31 wt% with 2 wt% Co at 200 °C and 10 bar.

A study done by Rapp and Shelby sought to increase the hydrogen release rate through photo-induced outgassing in doped HGMs in comparison to conventional heating methods. The glass was doped with optically active metals to interact with the high-intensity infrared light. The study found that 0.5 wt% Fe_{3}O_{4} doped 7070 borosilicate glass had hydrogen release increase proportionally to the infrared lamp intensity. In addition to the improvements to diffusivity by infrared alone, reactions between the hydrogen and iron-doped glass increased the Fe^{2+}/Fe^{3+} ratio which increased infrared absorption therefore further increasing the hydrogen yield.

As of 2020, the progress made in studying HGMs has increased its efficiency but it still falls short of Department of Energy targets for this technology. The operation temperatures for both hydrogen adsorption and release are the largest barrier to commercialization.

== Stationary hydrogen storage ==
Unlike mobile applications, hydrogen density is not a huge problem for stationary applications. As for mobile applications, stationary applications can use established technology:

- Compressed hydrogen (CGH_{2}) in a hydrogen tank
- Liquid hydrogen in a (LH_{2}) cryogenic hydrogen tank
- Slush hydrogen in a cryogenic hydrogen tank

=== Underground hydrogen storage ===
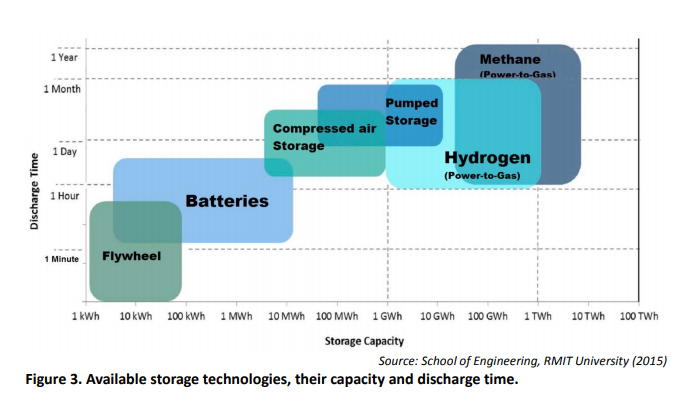
'Available storage technologies, their capacity and discharge time.'

Underground hydrogen storage is the practice of hydrogen storage in caverns, salt domes and depleted oil and gas fields. Large quantities of gaseous hydrogen have been stored in caverns by ICI for many years without any difficulties. The storage of large quantities of liquid hydrogen underground can function as grid energy storage. The round-trip efficiency is approximately 40% (vs. 75–80% for pumped-hydro (PHES)), and the cost is slightly higher than pumped hydro, if only a limited number of hours of storage is required. Another study referenced by a European staff working paper found that for large scale storage, the cheapest option is hydrogen at €140/MWh for 2,000 hours of storage using an electrolyser, salt cavern storage and combined-cycle power plant. The European project Hyunder indicated in 2013 that for the storage of wind and solar energy an additional 85 caverns are required as it cannot be covered by PHES and CAES systems. A German case study on storage of hydrogen in salt caverns found that if the German power surplus (7% of total variable renewable generation by 2025 and 20% by 2050) would be converted to hydrogen and stored underground, these quantities would require some 15 caverns of 500,000 cubic metres each by 2025 and some 60 caverns by 2050 – corresponding to approximately one third of the number of gas caverns currently operated in Germany. In the US, Sandia Labs are conducting research into the storage of hydrogen in depleted oil and gas fields, which could easily absorb large amounts of renewably produced hydrogen as there are some 2.7 million depleted wells in existence.

Underground hydrogen storage is the practice of hydrogen storage in caverns, salt domes and depleted oil/gas fields. Large quantities of gaseous hydrogen have been stored in caverns for many years. The storage of large quantities of hydrogen underground in solution-mined salt domes, aquifers, excavated rock caverns, or mines can function as grid energy storage, essential for the hydrogen economy. By using a turboexpander the electricity needs for compressed storage on 200 bar amounts to 2.1% of the energy content.

==== Salt caverns ====
The Chevron Phillips Clemens Terminal in Texas has stored hydrogen since the 1980s in a solution-mined salt cavern. The cavern roof is about 2,800 feet (850 m) underground. The cavern is a cylinder with a diameter of 160 feet (49 m), a height of 1,000 feet (300 m), and a usable hydrogen capacity of 1,066 million cubic feet (30.2×10^{6} m^{3}), or 2,520 metric tons (2,480 long tons; 2,780 short tons).

Salt caverns are artificially created by injecting water from the surface into a well in the rock salt, where rock salt is a polycrystalline material made of NaCl, halite. Locations such as salt domes or bedded salt are usually picked for salt caverns' creation. Salt caverns can reach a maximum depth of 2000 m and a maximum volume capacity of 1,000,000 m3. The frequency of injection and withdrawal cycles ranges between 10 and 12 cycles per year. The leak rate is around 1%.

Due to the physiochemical properties of the rock salt, salt caverns exhibit multiple advantages. Key characteristics are low water content, low porosity and permeability, and its chemical inertia towards hydrogen. Permeability is a key parameter in underground hydrogen storage, which affects its ability to seal. Though studies have found dilatancy and extensional fracture can cause significant permeability increase, rock salt crystal's recrystallization, which is a grain boundaries healing process, may contribute to its mechanical stiffness and permeability recovery. Its plastic properties prevent the formation and spread of fractures and protect it from losing its tightness, which is particularly important for hydrogen storage. Some of the disadvantages of salt caverns include lower storage capacity, large amount of water needed, and the effect of corrosion. Cushion gas is needed to avoid creep due to pressure drop when withdrawing gas from the reservoir. Though the need for cushion gas is relatively small, around 20%, the operational cost can still add up when working with a larger storage capacity. Cost is another big concern, where the cost of construction and operation are still high.

Though people have experience with storing natural gas, storing hydrogen is a lot more complex. Factors such as hydrogen diffusivity in solids cause restrictions in salt cavern storage. Microbial activity is under extensive research worldwide because of its impact on hydrogen loss. As a result of methanogenic bacteria's bacterial metabolism, carbon dioxide and hydrogen are consumed and methane is produced, which leads to the loss of hydrogen stored in the salt caverns.

==== Development ====
- Sandia National Laboratories released in 2011 a life-cycle cost analysis framework for geologic storage of hydrogen.
- The European project Hyunder indicated in 2013 that for the storage of wind and solar energy an additional 85 caverns are required as it cannot be covered by pumped-storage hydroelectricity and compressed air energy storage systems.
- ETI released in 2015 a report The role of hydrogen storage in a clean responsive power system noting that the UK has sufficient salt bed resources to provide tens of GWe.
- RAG Austria AG finished a hydrogen storage project in a depleted oil and gas field in Austria in 2017, and is conducting its second project "Underground Sun Conversion".

A cavern sized 800 m tall and 50 m diameter can hold hydrogen equivalent to 150 GWh.

=== Power to gas ===
Power to gas is a technology which converts electrical power to a gas fuel. There are two methods: the first is to use the electricity for water splitting and inject the resulting hydrogen into the natural gas grid; the second, less efficient method is used to convert carbon dioxide and hydrogen to methane, (see natural gas) using electrolysis and the Sabatier reaction. A third option is to combine the hydrogen via electrolysis with a source of carbon (either carbon dioxide or carbon monoxide from biogas, from industrial processes or via direct air-captured carbon dioxide) via biomethanation, where biomethanogens (archaea) consume carbon dioxide and hydrogen and produce methane within an anaerobic environment. This process is highly efficient, as the archaea are self-replicating and only require low-grade (60 °C) heat to perform the reaction.

Another process has also been achieved by SoCalGas to convert the carbon dioxide in raw biogas to methane in a single electrochemical step, representing a simpler method of converting excess renewable electricity into storable natural gas.

The UK has completed surveys and is preparing to start injecting hydrogen into the gas grid as the grid previously carried 'town gas' which is a 50% hydrogen-methane gas formed from coal. Auditors KPMG found that converting the UK to hydrogen gas could be £150bn to £200bn cheaper than rewiring British homes to use electric heating powered by lower-carbon sources.

Excess power or off peak power generated by wind generators or solar arrays can then be used for load balancing in the energy grid. Using the existing natural gas system for hydrogen, Fuel cell maker Hydrogenics and natural gas distributor Enbridge have teamed up to develop such a power to gas system in Canada.

Pipeline storage of hydrogen where a natural gas network is used for the storage of hydrogen. Before switching to natural gas, the German gas networks were operated using towngas, which for the most part (60-65%) consisted of hydrogen. The storage capacity of the German natural gas network is more than 200,000 GW·h which is enough for several months of energy requirement. By comparison, the capacity of all German pumped storage power plants amounts to only about 40 GW·h. The transport of energy through a gas network is done with much less loss (<0.1%) than in a power network (8%). The use of the existing natural gas pipelines for hydrogen was studied by NaturalHy.

== Automotive onboard hydrogen storage ==
Portability is one of the biggest challenges in the automotive industry, where high density storage systems are problematic due to safety concerns. High-pressure tanks weigh much more than the hydrogen they can hold. For example, in the 2014 Toyota Mirai, a full tank contains only 5.7% hydrogen, the rest of the weight being the tank.

System densities are often around half those of the working material, thus while a material may store 6 wt% H_{2}, a working system using that material may only achieve 3 wt% when the weight of tanks, temperature and pressure control equipment, etc., is considered.

=== Fuel cells and storage ===
Due to its clean-burning characteristics, hydrogen is a clean fuel alternative for the automotive industry. Hydrogen-based fuel could significantly reduce the emissions of greenhouse gases such as CO_{2}, SO_{2} and NO_{x}. Three problems for the use of hydrogen fuel cells (HFC) are efficiency, size, and safe onboard storage of the gas. Other major disadvantages of this emerging technology involve cost, operability and durability issues, which still need to be improved from the existing systems. To address these challenges, the use of nanomaterials has been proposed as an alternative option to the traditional hydrogen storage systems. The use of nanomaterials could provide a higher density system and increase the driving range towards the target set by the DOE at 300 miles. Carbonaceous materials such as carbon nanotube and metal hydrides are the main focus of research. They are currently being considered for onboard storage systems due to their versatility, multi-functionality, mechanical properties and low cost with respect to other alternatives.

=== Other advantages of nanomaterials in fuel cells ===
The introduction of nanomaterials in onboard hydrogen storage systems may be a major turning point in the automotive industry. However, storage is not the only aspect of the fuel cell to which nanomaterials may contribute. Different studies have shown that the transport and catalytic properties of Nafion membranes used in HFCs can be enhanced with TiO_{2}/SnO_{2} nanoparticles. The increased performance is caused by an improvement in hydrogen splitting kinetics due to catalytic activity of the nanoparticles. Furthermore, this system exhibits faster transport of protons across the cell which makes HFCs with nanoparticle composite membranes a promising alternative.

Another application of nanomaterials in water splitting has been introduced by a research group at Manchester Metropolitan University in the UK using screen-printed electrodes consisting of a graphene-like material. Similar systems have been developed using photoelectrochemical techniques.

=== Pressurized hydrogen gas ===
Increasing gas pressure improves the energy density by volume making for smaller container tanks. The standard material for holding pressurised hydrogen in tube trailers is steel (there is no hydrogen embrittlement problem with hydrogen gas). Tanks made of carbon and glass fibres reinforcing plastic as fitted in Toyota Mirai and Kenworth trucks are required to meet safety standards. Few materials are suitable for tanks as hydrogen being a small molecule tends to diffuse through many polymeric materials. The most common on board hydrogen storage in 2020 vehicles was hydrogen at pressure 700bar = 70MPa. The energy cost of compressing hydrogen to this pressure is significant.

Pressurized gas pipelines are always made of steel and operate at much lower pressures than tube trailers.

=== Liquid hydrogen ===
Alternatively, higher volumetric energy density liquid hydrogen or slush hydrogen may be used. However, liquid hydrogen is cryogenic and boils at 20.268 K (−252.882 °C or −423.188 °F). Cryogenic storage cuts weight but requires large liquification energies. The liquefaction process, involving pressurizing and cooling steps, is energy intensive. The liquefied hydrogen has lower energy density by volume than gasoline by approximately a factor of four, because of the low density of liquid hydrogen – there are actually more oxidizable hydrogen atoms in a litre of gasoline (116 grams) than there are in a litre of pure liquid hydrogen (71 grams). Like any other liquid at cryogenic temperatures, the liquid hydrogen storage tanks must also be well insulated to minimize boil off.

Japan has a liquid hydrogen (LH2) storage facility at a terminal in Kobe, and was expected to receive the first shipment of liquid hydrogen via LH2 carrier in 2020. Hydrogen is liquified by reducing its temperature to −253 °C, similar to liquified natural gas (LNG) which is stored at −162 °C. A potential efficiency loss of 12.79% can be achieved, or 4.26 kWh/kg out of 33.3 kWh/kg.

== Research ==
The Hydrogen Storage Materials research field is vast, having tens of thousands of published papers. According to Papers in the 2000 to 2015 period collected from Web of Science and processed in VantagePoint bibliometric software, a scientometric review of research in hydrogen storage materials was constituted. According to the literature, hydrogen energy went through a hype-cycle type of development in the 2000s. Research in Hydrogen Storage Materials grew at increasing rates from 2000 to 2010. Afterwards, growth continued but at decreasing rates, and a plateau was reached in 2015. Looking at individual country output, there is a division between countries that after 2010 inflected to a constant or slightly declining production, such as the European Union countries, the US and Japan, and those whose production continued growing until 2015, such as China and South Korea. The countries with most publications were China, the EU and the United States, followed by Japan. China kept the leading position throughout the entire period, and had a higher share of hydrogen storage materials publications in its total research output.

Among materials classes, Metal-Organic Frameworks were the most researched materials, followed by Simple Hydrides. Three typical behaviors were identified:

1. New materials, researched mainly after 2004, such as MOFs and Borohydrides;
2. Classic materials, present through the entire period with growing number of papers, such as Simple Hydrides, and
3. Materials with stagnant or declining research through the end of the period, such as AB5 alloys and Carbon Nanotubes.

However, current physisorption technologies are still far from being commercialized. The experimental studies are executed for small samples less than 100 g. The described technologies require high pressure and/or low temperatures as a rule. Therefore, at their current state of the art these techniques are not considered as a separate novel technology but as a type of valuable add-on to current compression and liquefaction methods.

Physisorption processes are reversible since no activation energy is involved and the interaction energy is very low. In materials such as metal–organic frameworks, porous carbons, zeolites, clathrates, and organic polymers, hydrogen is physisorbed on the surface of the pores. In these classes of materials, the hydrogen storage capacity mainly depends on the surface area and pore volume. The main limitation of use of these sorbents as H_{2}storage materials is weak van der Waals interaction energy between hydrogen and the surface of the sorbents. Therefore, many of the physisorption based materials have high storage capacities at liquid nitrogen temperature and high pressures, but their capacities become very low at ambient temperature and pressure.

LOHC, liquid organic hydrogen storage systems is a promising technique for future hydrogen storage. LOHC are organic compounds that can absorb and release hydrogen through chemical reactions. These compounds are characterized by the fact that they can be loaded and un-loaded with considerable amounts of hydrogen in a cyclic process. In principle, every unsaturated compound (organic molecules with C-C double or triple bonds) can take up hydrogen during hydrogenation. This technique ensures that the release of compounds into the atmosphere are entirely avoided in hydrogen storage. Therefore, LOHCs is an attractive way to provide wind and solar energy for mobility applications in the form of liquid energy carrying molecules of similar energy storage densities and manageability as today's fossil fuels.

== See also ==
- Cascade storage system
- Cryo-adsorption
- Electrochemical hydrogen compressor
- Hydrogenography
- Hydrogen energy plant in Denmark
- Industrial gas
- Tunable nanoporous carbon
- Combined-cycle hydrogen power plant
- Grid energy storage
- Hydrogen infrastructure
- Hydrogen economy
- Hydrogen turboexpander-generator
- Power-to-gas
- Timeline of hydrogen technologies
