= Liquid organic hydrogen carrier =

Organic compounds that can absorb and release hydrogen through chemical reactions

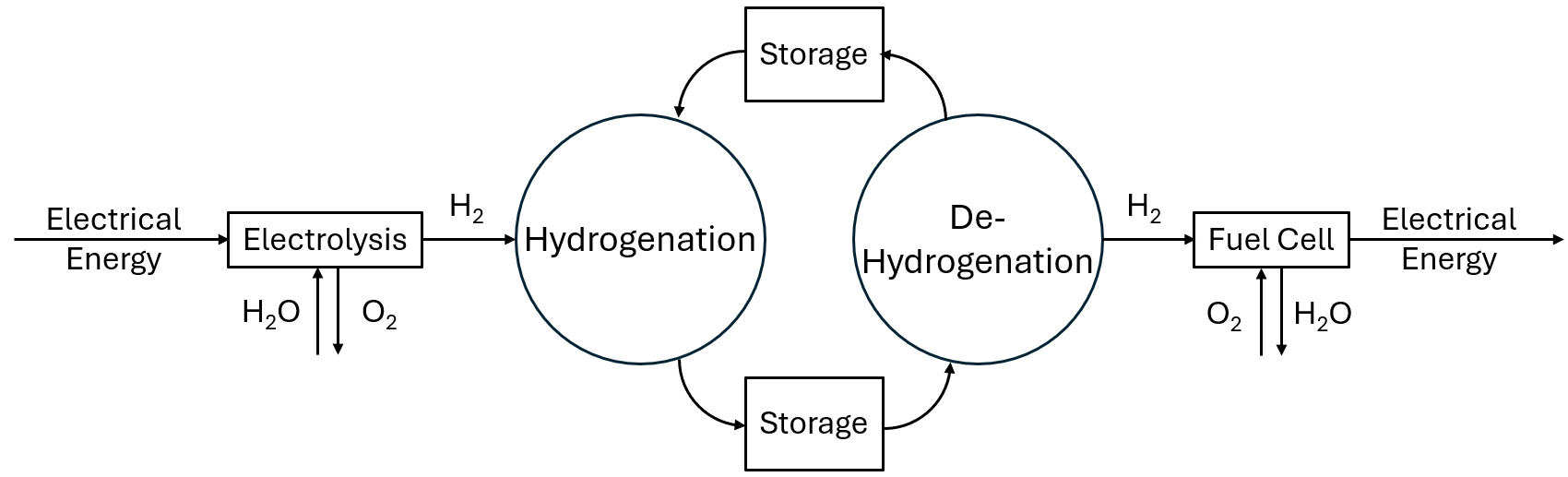
Schematic of an LOHC process for storing electrical energy

Liquid organic hydrogen carriers (LOHC) are organic compounds that can absorb and release hydrogen through chemical reactions. LOHCs can therefore be used as storage media for hydrogen. In principle, every unsaturated compound (organic molecules with C-C double or triple bonds) can take up hydrogen during hydrogenation. The sequence of endothermal dehydrogenation followed by hydrogen purification is considered as the main drawback which limits the overall efficiency of the storage cycle. LOHC shipping without heat recycling has an energy efficiency of 60–70%, depending on the dehydrogenation rate, which is equivalent to liquid hydrogen shipping. With heat recycling, the energy efficiency increase to 80–90%.

In 2020, Japan built up the world's first international hydrogen supply chain between Brunei and Kawasaki City utilizing toluene-based LOHC technology. Hyundai Motor invests in the development for stationary and on-board LOHC-systems.

== Principle of LOHC-based hydrogen storage ==
To absorb hydrogen, the dehydrogenated form of LOHC (an unsaturated, mostly aromatic compound) reacts with the hydrogen in a hydrogenation reaction. The hydrogenation is an exothermic reaction and is carried out at elevated pressures (approx. 30–50 bar) and temperatures of approx. 150–200°C in the presence of a catalyst. The corresponding saturated compound is thereby formed, which can be stored or transported under ambient conditions. If the hydrogen is needed again, the now hydrogenated, hydrogen-rich form of the LOHC is dehydrogenated, with the hydrogen being released again from the LOHC. This reaction is endothermic and takes place at elevated temperatures (250–320°C) again in the presence of a catalyst. Before the hydrogen can be used, it may have to be cleaned of LOHC steam. To increase efficiency, the heat contained in the hot material flow exiting the release unit should be transferred to the cold material flow consisting of hydrogen-rich LOHC entering the release unit in order to keep the energy requirement for preheating it before the reaction low.

In particular, the heat released by the hydrogenation reaction when the hydrogen is absorbed can in principle be used for heating purposes or as process heat.

== Requirements for LOHC materials ==
LOHC materials need to have a high hydrogen storage capacity, ideally able to store over 5 wt% of hydrogen. Second, the materials should exhibit reversible hydrogenation and dehydrogenation properties, maintaining stability over multiple cycles without significant degradation. Additionally, the thermodynamic and kinetic properties of the materials must be optimized to ensure low energy consumption and rapid reactions during hydrogenation and dehydrogenation. Long-term stability and good catalyst compatibility are also crucial for the effectiveness of LOHC materials. LOHC materials must have low volatility and high boiling points to minimize loss during storage and transport. Finally, the materials need to be non-toxic, environmentally friendly, and economically viable for large-scale applications.

== Determination of the degree of hydrogenation ==
The determination of the degree of hydrogenation is a critical aspect in the analysis of unsaturated compounds, particularly in polymer chemistry. The 1 H NMR technique is a primary method used to confirm hydrogenation processes and to quantify the degree of hydrogenation over varying reaction times. This technique is particularly effective when hydrogenation follows the esterification of hydroxyl groups, as seen in the hydrogenation of hydroxyl terminated polybutadiene (HTPB) using a catalyst system of diisobutylaluminum hydride (DIBAL-H) and Co III acetylacetonate in cyclohexane as a solvent. The degree of hydrogenation itself refers to the extent to which unsaturated fats are converted to saturated fats through hydrogen addition, which is a fundamental chemical reaction in organic synthesis. Additionally, advanced methods such as emission spectroscopy can be employed to measure the degree of molecular dissociation in hydrogen plasmas, which is relevant for understanding hydrogenation processes. This approach allows for a more nuanced analysis of hydrogenation, particularly in non-thermal environments, enhancing the accuracy of hydrogenation degree assessments. In summary, the combination of 1 H NMR and emission spectroscopy provides a robust framework for determining the degree of hydrogenation, facilitating improvements in material properties and expanding the applications of hydrogenated polymers.

== Direct LOHC fuel cell ==
An alternative, innovative and highly promising approach to convert LOHC-bound hydrogen into electricity is proposed recently. The new unloading sequence consists of an almost thermoneutral catalysed transfer hydrogenation step converting ketone (acetone) to secondary alcohol (2-propanol) by contacting hydrogen-rich carrier (H18-DBT), and the secondary alcohol is then directly consumed in a PEMFC (direct isopropanol fuel cell; DIPAFC). It is a CO_{2} emission-free, external energy input-free, and safe sequence with no molecular hydrogen at any point during hydrogen releasing. The "direct LOHC fuel cell" based on the LOHC-DIPAFC coupling concept is a very attractive solution for the on-board generation of electric energy in mobile applications, and it's driving researchers to focus on the topic.

== Examples of LOHC materials ==
=== Toluene / methylcyclohexane ===
As early as the 1980s there were attempts with toluene, which is converted to methylcyclohexane by hydrogenation. The basic idea of this variant came from the USA in 1975 and was further developed in 1979 at the Paul Scherrer Institute in Switzerland together with the ETH Zurich. Even then, the prototype of a truck was built that was powered by hydrogen from the dehydrogenation of methylcyclohexane. The entire circuit is known as the Methylcyclohexane-Toluene-Hydrogen system (MTH).

Gravimetric hydrogen storage densities of methylcyclohexane and toluene (MCH-TOL) are 6.1 wt%, or volumetric hydrogen storage densities at 47 kg/m^{3} in ambient conditions, corresponding to 5.5 MJ/L hydrogen. Although MCH is reasonably stable (enthalpy of dehydrogenation: 68 kJ/mol), it must be dehydrogenated at temperatures of 350 °C and hydrogenated at 150 °C.

Chiyoda (Japan) uses MCH-TOL as the hydrogen carrier for its SPERA hydrogen delivery business. According to reports for Chiyoda's demonstration plant, which has a production rate of 50 Nm^{3} per hour, the dehydrogenation of MCH happens at 350 °C and with a Pt/Al_{2}O_{3} catalyst, with an MCH conversion rate greater than 95% and toluene selectivity higher than 99.9%. For the (de)hydrogenation of TOL/MCH, several catalysts including Ni, Pt group metals, and bimetallic Pt/Mo on different support materials have also been investigated.

=== Dibenzyltoluene ===
Dibenzyltoluene (DBT) is studied to circumvent the high melting temperature of N-ethylcarbazole (liquid phase between 68 and 270°C) and the high vapor pressure of toluene. Vapor pressure at 40°C of toluene is 7880 Pa and methylcyclohexane is 10900 Pa while DBT is 0.07 Pa and perhydro-dibenzyltoluene (H18-DBT) is 0.04 Pa. This substance is currently being used as a heat transfer oil, for example, under the trade name Marlotherm SH. Temperatures of approx. 300°C are necessary for dehydrogenation. However, dibenzyltoluene is superior to other carrier substances in many physico-chemical properties.

DBT hydrogenate into H18-DBT when exposed to platinum group metals at 140°C and can dehydrogenate at temperatures between 270°C and 320°C. The resulting DBT/H18-DBT mixture has a notable hydrogen storage capacity of 6.2wt%, is minimally toxic, and high thermal stability with ignition temperature at 450°C. While the storage capacity is 6.2 wt% and the energy density is 1.9 kWh/L, considering the de-hydrogenation limitation the storage capacity is 6.0 wt% and the energy density 1.8 kWh/L. The price for dibenzyltoluene is around 4 €/kg. DBT can be hydrogenated with hydrogen-containing gas mixtures which is especially attractive for large-scale applications because it can be integrate into industrial processes that already produce such gas mixtures. Hydrogenation reactions can be done with catalysts like Pt and Ru, supported by Al_{2}O_{3}. For the dehydrogenation, Pd and Ru catalysts supported by carbon are used. Companies like Hydrogenious Technologies GmbH in Germany and HySA Infrastructure in South Africa have adopted the DBT/H18-DBT system as LOHCs. The DBT/H18-DBT cost for the components for the hydrogenation process is $5000 USD/tonne for materials, US$ 134000/tonne for reactors, and US$ 3000/tonne for storage tanks.
