= Binary compounds of hydrogen =

Chemical compounds containing only hydrogen and one other chemical element

Binary compounds of hydrogen are binary chemical compounds containing just hydrogen and one other chemical element. By convention all binary hydrogen compounds are called hydrides even when the hydrogen atom in it is not an anion. These hydrogen compounds can be grouped into several types.

== Overview ==
Binary hydrogen compounds in group 1 are the ionic hydrides (also called saline hydrides) wherein hydrogen is bound electrostatically. Because hydrogen is located somewhat centrally in an electronegative sense, it is necessary for the counterion to be exceptionally electropositive for the hydride to possibly be accurately described as truly behaving ionic. Therefore, this category of hydrides contains only a few members.

Hydrides in group 2 are polymeric covalent hydrides. In these, hydrogen forms bridging covalent bonds, usually possessing mediocre degrees of ionic character, which make them difficult to be accurately described as either covalent or ionic. The one exception is beryllium hydride, which has definitively covalent properties.

Hydrides in the transition metals and lanthanides are also typically polymeric covalent hydrides. However, they usually possess only weak degrees of ionic character. Usually, these hydrides rapidly decompose into their component elements at ambient conditions. The results consist of metallic matrices with dissolved, often stoichiometric or near so, concentrations of hydrogen, ranging from negligible to substantial. Such a solid can be thought of as a solid solution and is alternately termed a metallic- or interstitial hydride. These decomposed solids are identifiable by their ability to conduct electricity and their magnetic properties (the presence of hydrogen is coupled with the delocalisation of the valence electrons of the metal), and their lowered density compared to the metal. Both the saline hydrides and the polymeric covalent hydrides typically react strongly with water and air.

It is possible to produce a metallic hydride without requiring decomposition as a necessary step. If a sample of bulk metal is subjected to any one of numerous hydrogen absorption techniques, the characteristics, such as luster and hardness of the metal is often retained to a large degree. Bulk actinoid hydrides are only known in this form. The affinity for hydrogen for most of the d-block elements are low. Therefore, elements in this block do not form hydrides (the hydride gap) under standard temperature and pressure with the notable exception of palladium. Palladium can absorb up to 900 times its own volume of hydrogen and is therefore actively researched in the field hydrogen storage.

Elements in group 13 to 17 (p-block) form covalent hydrides (or nonmetal hydrides). In group 12 zinc hydride is a common chemical reagent but cadmium hydride and mercury hydride are very unstable and esoteric. In group 13 boron hydrides exist as a highly reactive monomer BH_{3}, as an adduct for example ammonia borane or as dimeric diborane and as a whole group of BH cluster compounds. Alane (AlH_{3}) is a polymer. Gallium exists as the dimer digallane. Indium hydride is only stable below −90 °C (−130 °F). Not much is known about the final group 13 hydride, thallium hydride.

Due to the total number of possible binary saturated compounds with carbon of the type C_{n}H_{2n+2} being very large, there are many group 14 hydrides. Going down the group the number of binary silicon compounds (silanes) is small (straight or branched but rarely cyclic) for example disilane and trisilane. For germanium only 5 linear chain binary compounds are known as gases or volatile liquids. Examples are n-pentagermane, isopentagermane and neopentagermane. Of tin only the distannane is known. Plumbane is an unstable gas.

The hydrogen halides, hydrogen chalcogenides and pnictogen hydrides also form compounds with hydrogen, whose lightest members show many anomalous properties due to hydrogen bonding.

Non-classical hydrides are those in which extra hydrogen molecules are coordinated as a ligand on the central atoms. These are very unstable but some have been shown to exist.

Polyhydrides or superhydrides are compounds in which the number of hydrogen atoms exceed the valency of the combining atom. These may only be stable under extreme pressure, but may be high temperature superconductors, such as H_{3}S, superconducting at up to 203 K. Polyhydrides are actively studied with the hope of discovering a room temperature superconductor.

== The periodic table of the stable binary hydrides ==
The relative stability of binary hydrogen compounds and alloys at standard temperature and pressure can be inferred from their standard enthalpy of formation values.

H_{2} 0																	He
LiH −91	BeH_{2} negative											BH_{3} 41	CH_{4} −74.8	NH_{3} −46.8	H_{2}O −243	HF −272	Ne
NaH −57	MgH_{2} −75											AlH_{3} −46	SiH_{4} 31	PH_{3} 5.4	H_{2}S −20.7	HCl −93	Ar
KH −58	CaH_{2} −174	ScH_{2}	TiH_{2}	VH	CrH	Mn	FeH, FeH_{2}	Co	Ni	CuH	ZnH_{2}	GaH_{3}	GeH_{4} 92	AsH_{3} 67	H_{2}Se 30	HBr −36.5	Kr
RbH −47	SrH_{2} −177	YH_{2}	ZrH_{2}	NbH	Mo	Tc	Ru	Rh	PdH	Ag	CdH_{2}	InH_{3}	SnH_{4} 163	SbH_{3} 146	H_{2}Te 100	HI 26.6	Xe
CsH −50	BaH_{2} −172	LuH_{2}	HfH_{2}	TaH	W	Re	Os	Ir	Pt	Au	Hg	Tl	PbH_{4} 252	BiH_{3} 247	H_{2}Po 167	HAt positive	Rn
Fr	Ra	Lr	Rf	Db	Sg	Bh	Hs	Mt	Ds	Rg	Cn	Nh	Fl	Mc	Lv	Ts	Og
		↓															
		LaH_{2}	CeH_{2}	PrH_{2}	NdH_{2}	PmH_{2}	SmH_{2}	EuH_{2}	GdH_{2}	TbH_{2}	DyH_{2}	HoH_{2}	ErH_{2}	TmH_{2}	YbH_{2}		
		Ac	Th	Pa	U	Np	Pu	Am	Cm	Bk	Cf	Es	Fm	Md	No		

Binary compounds of hydrogen
Covalent hydrides	metallic hydrides
Ionic hydrides	Intermediate hydrides
Do not exist	Not assessed

== Molecular hydrides ==
The isolation of monomeric molecular hydrides usually require extremely mild conditions, which are partial pressure and cryogenic temperature. The reason for this is threefold - firstly, most molecular hydrides are thermodynamically unstable toward decomposition into their elements; secondly, many molecular hydrides are also thermodynamically unstable toward polymerisation; and thirdly, most molecular hydrides are also kinetically unstable toward these types of reactions due to low activation energy barriers.

Instability toward decomposition is generally attributable to poor contribution from the orbitals of the heavier elements to the molecular bonding orbitals. Instability toward polymerisation is a consequence of the electron-deficiency of the monomers relative to the polymers. Relativistic effects play an important role in determining the energy levels of molecular orbitals formed by the heavier elements. As a consequence, these molecular hydrides are commonly less electron-deficient than otherwise expected. For example, based on its position in the 12th column of the periodic table alone, mercury(II) hydride would be expected to be rather deficient. However, it is in fact satiated, with the monomeric form being much more energetically favourable than any oligomeric form.

The table below shows the monomeric hydride for each element that is closest to, but not surpassing its heuristic valence. A heuristic valence is the valence of an element that strictly obeys the octet, duodectet, and sexdectet valence rules. Elements may be prevented from reaching their heuristic valence by various steric and electronic effects. In the case of chromium, for example, stearic hindrance ensures that both the octahedral and trigonal prismatic molecular geometries for CrH_{6} are thermodynamically unstable to rearranging to a Kubas complex structural isomer.

Where available, both the enthalpy of formation for each monomer and the enthalpy of formation for the hydride in its standard state is shown (in brackets) to give a rough indication of which monomers tend to undergo aggregation to lower enthalpic states. For example, monomeric lithium hydride has an enthalpy of formation of 139 kJ mol^{−1}, whereas solid lithium hydride has an enthalpy of −91 kJ mol^{−1}. This means that it is energetically favourable for a mole of monomeric LiH to aggregate into the ionic solid, losing 230 kJ as a consequence. Aggregation can occur as a chemical association, such as polymerisation, or it can occur as an electrostatic association, such as the formation of hydrogen-bonding in water.

=== Classical hydrides ===
Classical hydrides
1	2	3	4	5	6	5	4	3	2	1	2	3	4	3	2	1
H_{2} 0
LiH ^{139}_{(−91)}	BeH_{2} ^{123}											BH_{3} ^{107}_{(41)}	CH_{4} −75	NH_{3} −46	H_{2}O ^{−242}_{(−286)}	HF −273
NaH ^{140}_{(−56)}	MgH_{2} ^{142}_{(−76)}											AlH_{3} ^{123}_{(−46)}	SiH_{4} 34	PH_{3} 5	H_{2}S −21	HCl −92
KH ^{132}_{(−58)}	CaH_{2} ^{192}_{(−174)}	ScH_{3}	TiH_{4}	VH_{2}	CrH_{2}	MnH_{2} (−12)	FeH_{2} 324	CoH_{2}	NiH_{2} 168	CuH ^{278}_{(28)}	ZnH_{2} 162	GaH_{3} 151	GeH_{4} 92	AsH_{3} 67	H_{2}Se 30	HBr −36
RbH ^{132}_{(−47)}	SrH_{2} ^{201}_{(−177)}	YH_{3}	ZrH_{4}	NbH_{4}	MoH_{6}	Tc	RuH_{2}	RhH_{2}	PdH 361	AgH 288	CdH_{2} 183	InH_{3} 222	SnH_{4} 163	SbH_{3} 146	H_{2}Te 100	HI 27
CsH ^{119}_{(−50)}	BaH_{2} ^{213}_{(−177)}	LuH_{3}	HfH_{4}	TaH_{4}	WH_{6} 586	ReH_{4}	Os	Ir	PtH_{2}	AuH 295	HgH_{2} 101	TlH_{3} 293	PbH_{4} 252	BiH_{3} 247	H_{2}Po 167	HAt 88
Fr	Ra	Lr	Rf	Db	Sg	Bh	Hs	Mt	Ds	Rg	Cn	Nh	Fl	Mc	Lv	Ts
		↓														
		3	4	5	6	7	8	7	6	5	4	3	2	1	2	
		LaH_{3}	CeH_{4}	PrH_{3}	NdH_{4}	Pm	SmH_{4}	EuH_{3}	GdH_{3}	TbH_{3}	DyH_{4}	HoH_{3}	ErH_{2}	TmH	YbH_{2}	
		Ac	ThH_{4}	Pa	UH_{4}	Np	Pu	Am	Cm	Bk	Cf	Es	Fm	Md	No	

Legend
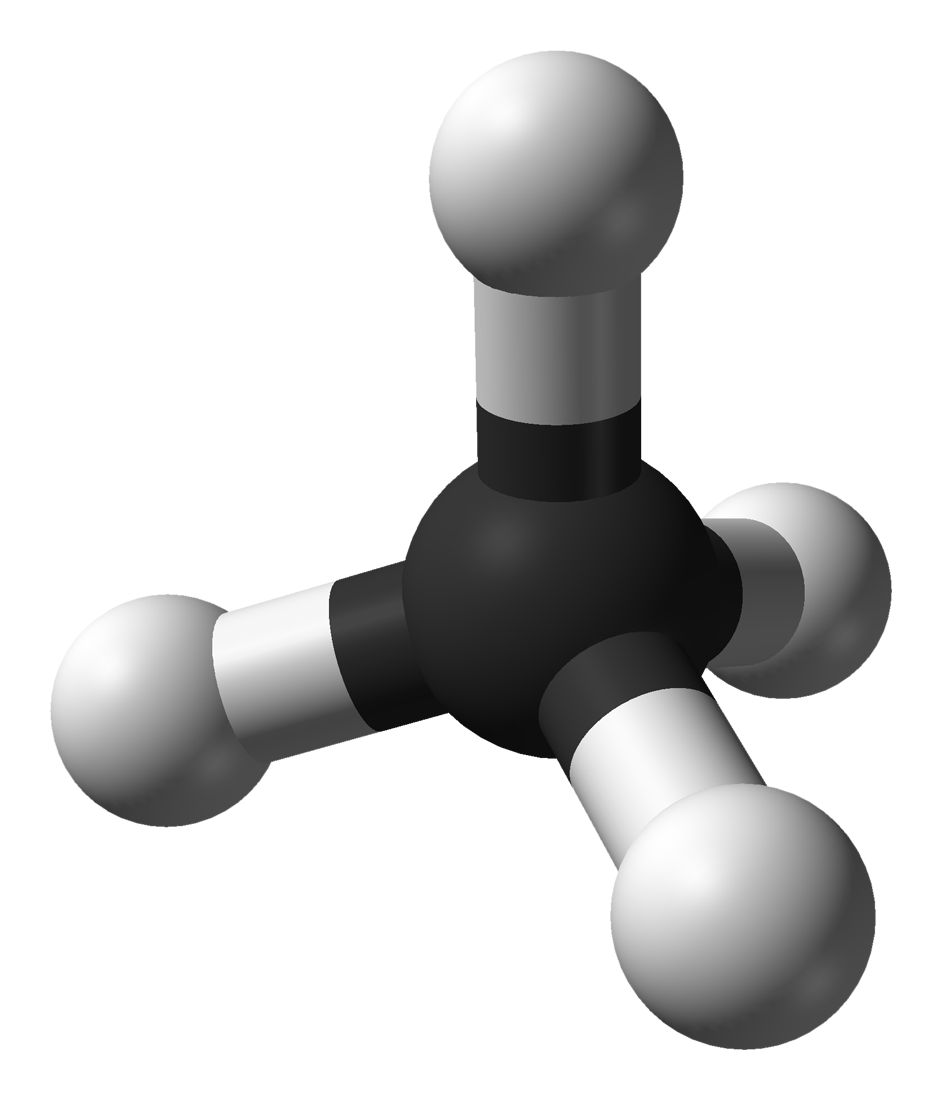
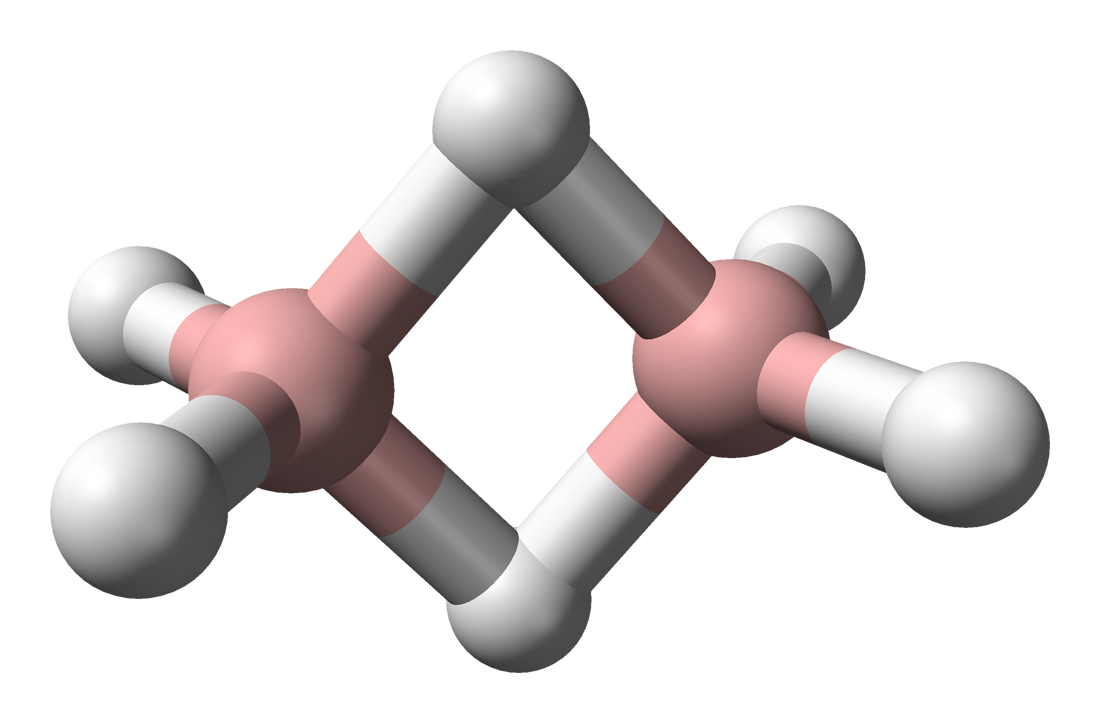
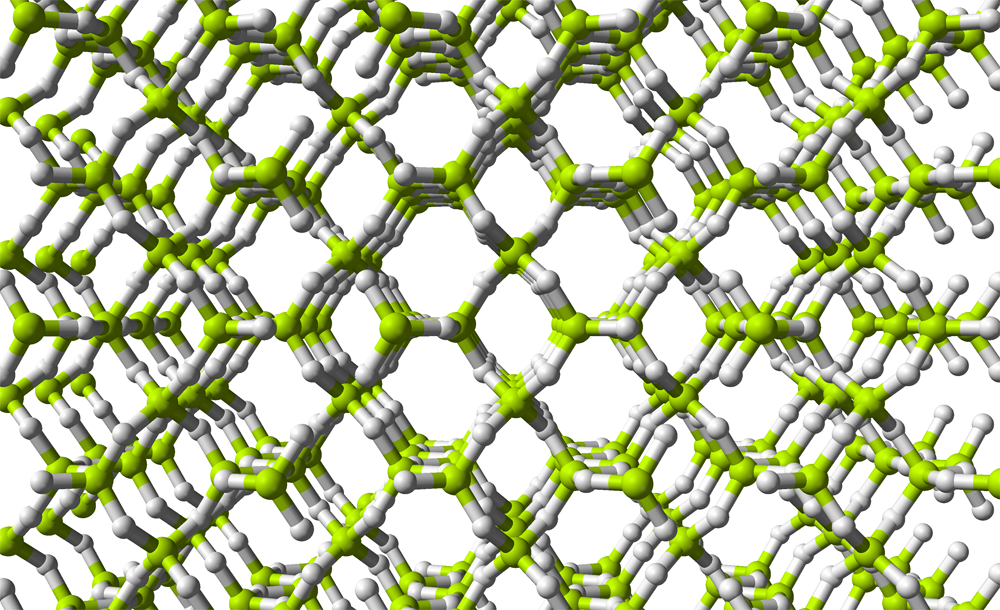
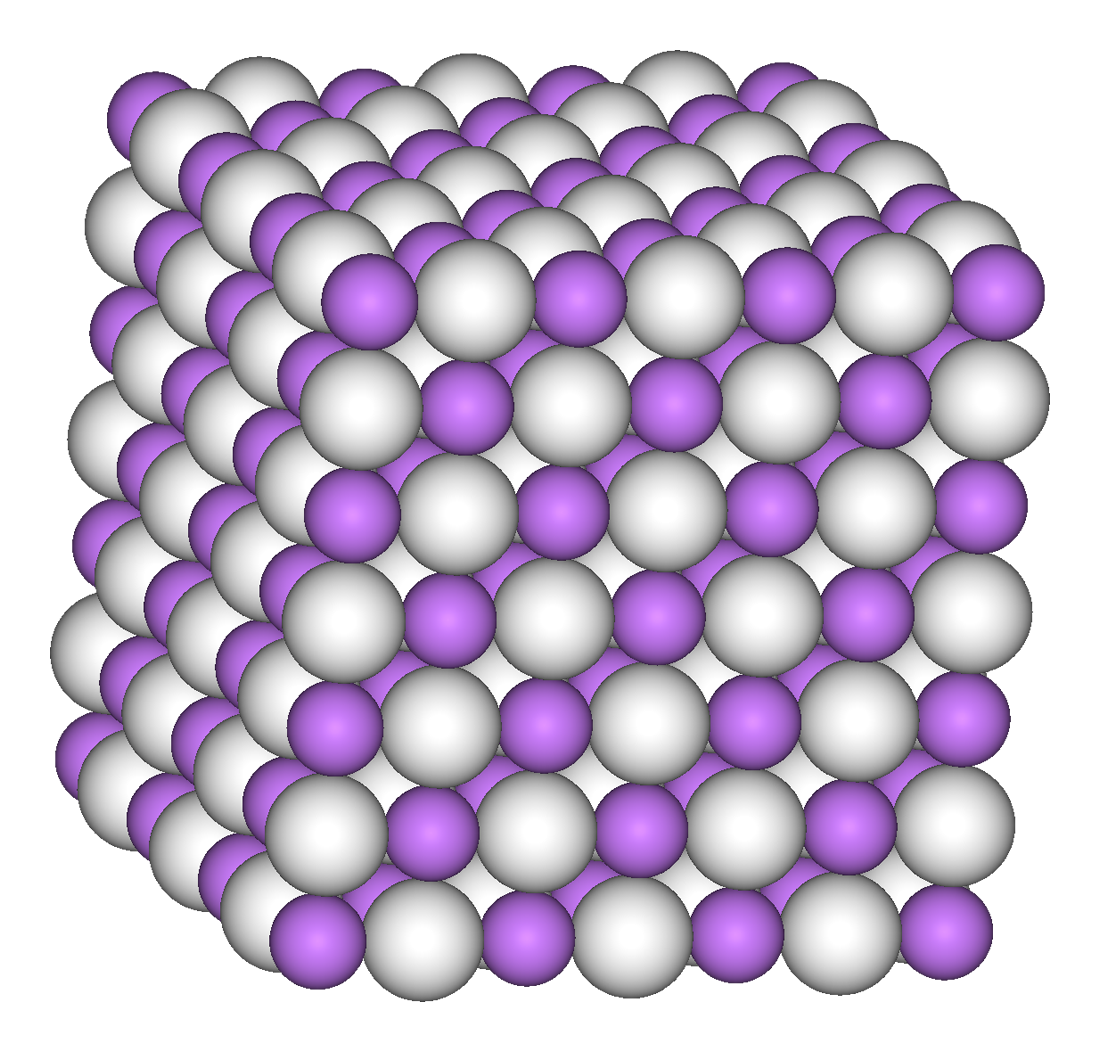
Monomeric covalent	Oligomeric covalent
Polymeric covalent	Ionic
Polymeric delocalised covalent	Ionic
Unknown solid structure	Not assessed

This table includes the thermally unstable dihydrogen complexes for the sake of completeness. As with the above table, only the complexes with the most complete valence is shown, to the negligence of the most stable complex.

=== Non-classical covalent hydrides ===
A molecular hydride may be able to bind to hydrogen molecules acting as a ligand. The complexes are termed non-classical covalent hydrides. These complexes contain more hydrogen than the classical covalent hydrides, but are only stable at very low temperatures. They may be isolated in inert gas matrix, or as a cryogenic gas. Others have only been predicted using computational chemistry.

Non-classical covalent hydrides
8		18								8					
LiH(H_{2})_{2}	Be											BH_{3}(H_{2})			
Na	MgH_{2}(H_{2})_{n}											AlH_{3}(H_{2})			
K	Ca	ScH_{3}(H_{2})_{6}	TiH_{2}(H_{2})	VH_{2}(H_{2})	CrH_{2}(H_{2})_{2}	Mn	FeH_{2}(H_{2})_{3}	CoH(H_{2})	Ni(H_{2})_{4}	CuH(H_{2})	ZnH_{2}(H_{2})	GaH_{3}(H_{2})			
Rb	Sr	YH_{2}(H_{2})_{3}	Zr	NbH_{4}(H_{2})_{4}	Mo	Tc	RuH_{2}(H_{2})_{4}	RhH_{3}(H_{2})	Pd(H_{2})_{3}	AgH(H_{2})	CdH(H_{2})	InH_{3}(H_{2})			
Cs	Ba	Lu	Hf	TaH_{4}(H_{2})_{4}	WH_{4}(H_{2})_{4}	Re	Os	Ir	PtH(H_{2})	AuH_{3}(H_{2})	Hg	Tl			
Fr	Ra	Lr	Rf	Db	Sg	Bh	Hs	Mt	Ds	Rg	Cn	Nh			
		↓													
		32												18	
		LaH_{2}(H_{2})_{2}	CeH_{2}(H_{2})	PrH_{2}(H_{2})_{2}	Nd	Pm	Sm	Eu	GdH_{2}(H_{2})	Tb	Dy	Ho	Er	Tm	Yb
		Ac	ThH_{4}(H_{2})_{4}	Pa	UH_{4}(H_{2})_{6}	Np	Pu	Am	Cm	Bk	Cf	Es	Fm	Md	No

Legend
Assessed	Not assessed

== Van der Waals compounds ==
Under high pressure, hydrogen forms a distinct class of binary compounds with certain other elements: stoichiometric solids in which H_{2} molecules and a second closed-shell species (an atom or another molecule) are held together by van der Waals forces rather than by ionic, covalent, or metallic bonding. Unlike the hydrides described above, hydrogen retains its molecular H–H bond in these compounds, and no new chemical bond forms between hydrogen and the other element.

Methane and hydrogen crystallize into such compounds at pressures of 5–7 GPa. A 2022 study using synchrotron X-ray diffraction and Raman spectroscopy identified three stable methane-hydrogen compositions — CH_{4}(H_{2})_{2}, (CH_{4})_{2}H_{2}, and (CH_{4})_{3}(H_{2})_{25} — the last of which contains over 50 weight percent molecular hydrogen and remains stable above 160 GPa.

Analogous compounds occur between hydrogen and the noble gases. Ar(H_{2})_{2} adopts a Laves-phase structure and remains stable to at least 358 GPa, with hydrogen retaining its molecular character throughout. Kr(H_{2})_{4} has a face-centred cubic structure stable above 5.3 GPa, and Xe(H_{2})_{8} forms above 4.8 GPa and remains an electrical insulator to at least 255 GPa.

A related compound forms between hydrogen and iodine: laser heating a mixture of iodine and hydrogen above 25 GPa produces HI(H_{2})_{13}, in which icosahedral clusters of thirteen H_{2} molecules isolate individual HI molecules, stabilizing the compound from 9 to at least 130 GPa — a far wider pressure range than pure HI, which decomposes by around 10 GPa at room temperature.

These weakly bound, hydrogen-rich solids are of interest for planetary science, as analogues of chemistry that may occur in the interiors of ice giants such as Uranus and Neptune, and as candidate materials for hydrogen storage.

== Hydrogen solutions ==
Hydrogen has a highly variable solubility in the elements. When the continuous phase of the solution is a metal, it is called a metallic hydride or interstitial hydride, on account of the position of the hydrogen within the crystal structure of the metal. In solution, hydrogen can occur in either the atomic or molecular form. For some elements, when hydrogen content exceeds its solubility, the excess precipitates out as a stoichiometric compound. The table below shows the solubility of hydrogen in each element as a molar ratio at 25 °C (77 °F) and 100 kPa.

																	He
LiH_{<1×10^{−4}} (Note: Upper limit imposed by phase diagram, taken at 454 K.)	Be											B	C	N	O	F	Ne
NaH_{<8×10^{−7}} (Note: Upper limit imposed by phase diagram, taken at 383 K.)	MgH_{<0.010} (Note: Upper limit imposed by phase diagram, taken at 650 K and 25 MPa.)											AlH_{<2.5×10^{−8}} (Note: Upper limit imposed by phase diagram, taken at 556 K.)	Si	P	S	Cl	Ar
KH_{<<0.01} (Note: Upper limit imposed by phase diagram.)	CaH_{<<0.01} (Note: Upper limit imposed by phase diagram, taken at 500 K.)	ScH_{≥1.86} (Note: Lower limit imposed by phase diagram.)	TiH_{2.00} (Note: Limit imposed by phase diagram.)	VH_{1.00} (Note: Limit imposed by phase diagram.)	Cr	MnH_{<5×10^{−6}} (Note: Upper limit imposed by phase diagram, taken at 500 K.)	FeH_{3×10^{−8}}	Co	NiH_{3×10^{−5}}	CuH_{<1×10^{−7}} (Note: Upper limit imposed by phase diagram, taken at 1000 K.)	ZnH_{<3×10^{−7}} (Note: Upper limit at 500 K.)	Ga	Ge	As	Se	Br	Kr
RbH_{<<0.01} (Note: Upper limit imposed by phase diagram.)	Sr	YH_{≥2.85} (Note: Lower limit imposed by phase diagram.)	ZrH_{≥1.70} (Note: Lower limit imposed by phase diagram.)	NbH_{1.1} (Note: Limit imposed by phase diagram.)	Mo	Tc	Ru	Rh	PdH_{0.724}	AgH_{3.84×10^{−14}}	Cd	In	Sn	Sb	Te	I	Xe
CsH_{<<0.01} (Note: Upper limit imposed by phase diagram.)	Ba	Lu	Hf	TaH_{0.79} (Note: Limit imposed by phase diagram.)	W	Re	Os	Ir	Pt	AuH_{3.06×10^{−9}}	HgH_{5×10^{−7}}	Tl	Pb	Bi	Po	At	Rn
Fr	Ra	Lr	Rf	Db	Sg	Bh	Hs	Mt	Ds	Rg	Cn	Nh	Fl	Mc	Lv	Ts	Og
		↓															
		LaH_{≥2.03} (Note: Lower limit imposed by phase diagram.)	CeH_{≥2.5} (Note: Lower limit imposed by phase diagram.)	Pr	Nd	Pm	SmH_{3.00}	Eu	Gd	Tb	Dy	Ho	Er	Tm	Yb		
		Ac	Th	Pa	UH_{≥3.00} (Note: Lower limit imposed by phase diagram.)	Np	Pu	Am	Cm	Bk	Cf	Es	FM	Md	No		

Legend
Miscible	Undetermined
