= Transition metal hydride =

Chemical compounds

Transition metal hydrides are chemical compounds containing a transition metal bonded to hydrogen. Most transition metals form hydride complexes and some are significant in various catalytic and synthetic reactions. The term "hydride" is used loosely: some of them are acidic (e.g., H_{2}Fe(CO)_{4}), whereas some others are hydridic, having H^{−}-like character (e.g., ZnH_{2}).

== Classes of metal hydrides ==
=== Binary metal hydrides ===
Many transition metals form compounds with hydrogen. These materials are called binary hydrides, because they contain only two elements. The hydrogenic ligand is assumed to have hydridic (H^{−}-like) character. These compounds are invariably insoluble in all solvents, reflecting their polymeric structures. They often exhibit metal-like electrical conductivity. Many are nonstoichiometric compounds. Electropositive metals (Ti, Zr, Hf, Zn) and some other metals form hydrides with the stoichiometry MH or sometimes MH_{2} (M = Ti, Zr, Hf, V, Zn). The best studied are the binary hydrides of palladium, which readily forms a limiting monohydride. In fact, hydrogen gas diffuses through Pd windows via the intermediacy of PdH.

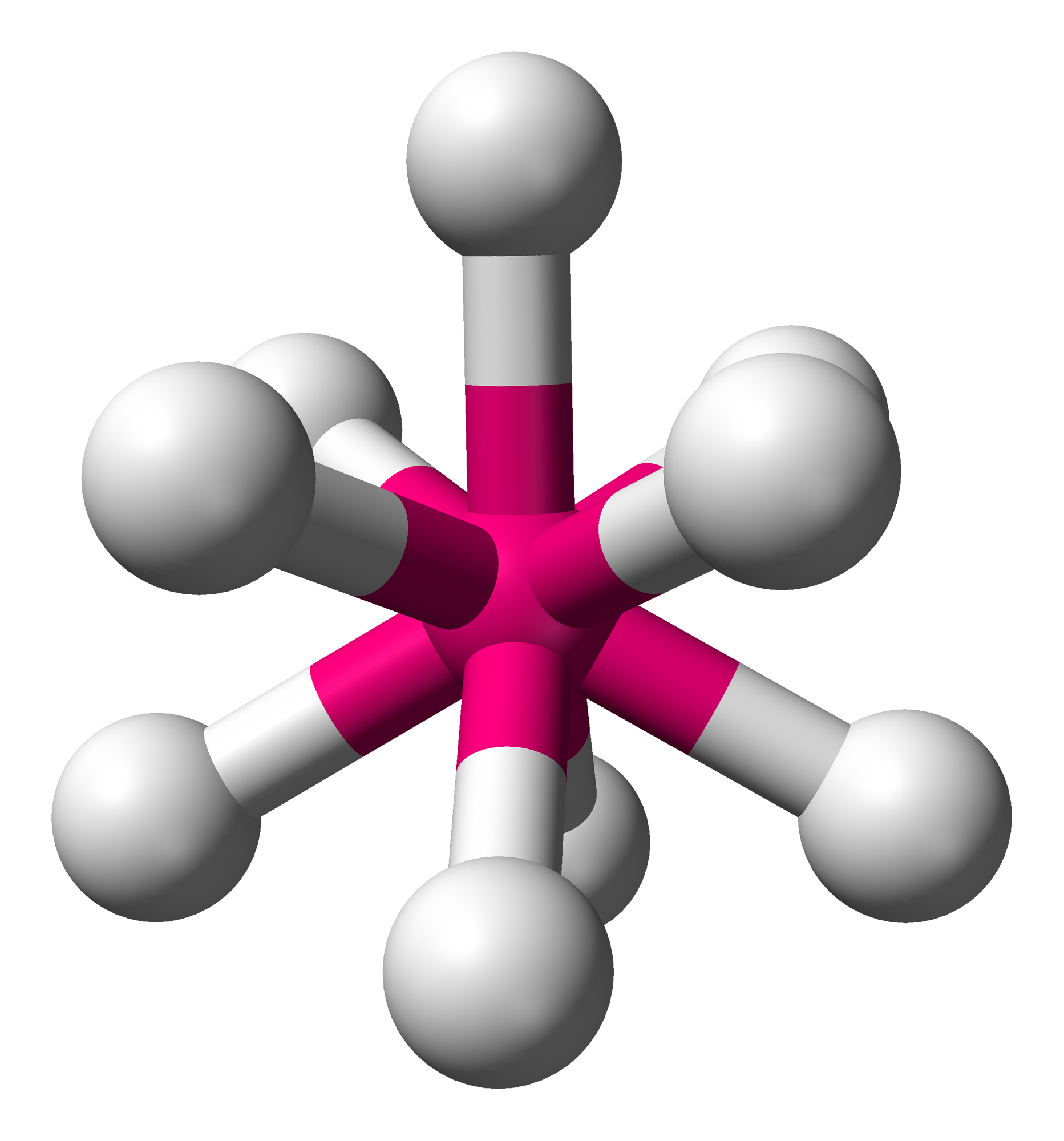
Structure of the ReH^{2−}_{9} anion in the salt K_{2}ReH_{9}.

=== Ternary metal hydrides ===
Ternary metal hydrides have the formula A_{x}MH_{n}, where A^{+} is an alkali or alkaline earth metal cation, e.g. K^{+} and Mg^{2+}. A celebrated example is K_{2}ReH_{9}, a salt containing two K^{+} ions and the ReH_{9}^{2−} anion. Other homoleptic metal hydrides include the anions in Mg_{2}FeH_{6} and Mg_{2}NiH_{4}. Some of these anionic polyhydrides satisfy the 18-electron rule, many do not. Because of their high lattice energy, these salts are typically not soluble in any solvents, a well known exception being K_{2}ReH_{9}.

=== Coordination complexes ===
The most prevalent hydrides of the transition metals are metal complexes that contain a mix of ligands in addition to hydride. The range of coligands is large. Virtually all of the metals form such derivatives. The main exceptions include the late metals silver, gold, cadmium, and mercury, which form few or unstable complexes with direct M-H bonds. Examples of industrially useful hydrides are HCo(CO)_{4} and HRh(CO)(PPh_{3})_{3}, which are catalysts for hydroformylation.

HFeCl(dppe)_{2} is one of the most accessible transition metal hydrides.

The first molecular hydrides of the transition metals were first reported in the 1930s by Walter Hieber and coworkers. They described H_{2}Fe(CO)_{4} and HCo(CO)_{4}. After a hiatus of several years, and following the release of German war documents on the postulated role of HCo(CO)_{4} in hydroformylation, several new hydrides were reported in the mid-1950s by three prominent groups in organometallic chemistry: HRe(C_{5}H_{5})_{2} by Geoffrey Wilkinson, HMo(C_{5}H_{5})(CO)_{3} by E. O. Fischer, and HPtCl(PEt_{3})_{2} by Joseph Chatt. Thousands of such compounds are now known.

=== Cluster hydrides ===
Like hydrido coordination complexes, many clusters feature terminal (bound by one M–H bond) hydride ligands. Hydride ligands can also bridge pairs of metals, as illustrated by [HW_{2}(CO)_{10}]^{−}. The cluster H_{2}Os_{3}(CO)_{10} features both terminal and doubly bridging hydride ligands. Hydrides can also span the triangular face of a cluster as in [Ag_{3}{(PPh_{2})_{2}CH_{2}}_{3}(μ_{3}-H)(μ_{3}-Cl)]BF_{4}. In the cluster [Co_{6}H(CO)_{15}]^{−}, the hydride is "interstitial", occupying a position at the center of the Co_{6} octahedron. The assignment for cluster hydrides can be challenging as illustrated by studies on Stryker's reagent [Cu_{6}(PPh_{3})_{6}H_{6}].

== Synthesis ==
=== Hydride transfer ===
Nucleophilic main group hydrides convert many transition metal halides and cations into the corresponding hydrides:

ML_{n}X + LiBHEt_{3} → HML_{n} + BEt_{3} + LiX

These conversions are metathesis reactions, and the hydricity of the product is generally less than of the hydride donor. Classical (and relatively cheap) hydride donor reagents include sodium borohydride and lithium aluminium hydride. In the laboratory, more control is often offered by "mixed hydrides" such as lithium triethylborohydride and Red-Al. Alkali metal hydrides, e.g. sodium hydride, are not typically useful reagents.

=== Elimination reactions ===
Beta-hydride elimination and alpha-hydride elimination are processes that afford hydrides. The former a common termination pathway in homogeneous polymerization. It also allows some transition metal hydride complexes to be synthesized from organolithium and Grignard reagents:

ML_{n}X + LiC_{4}H_{9} → C_{4}H_{9}ML_{n} + LiX
C_{4}H_{9}ML_{n} → HML_{n} + H_{2}C=CHC_{2}H_{5}

=== Oxidative additions ===
Oxidative addition of dihydrogen to a low valent transition metal center is common. Several metals react directly with H_{2}, though usually heat to a few hundred degrees is required. One example is titanium dihydride, which forms when titanium sponge is heated to 400-700 °C under an atmosphere of hydrogen. These reactions typically require high surface area metals. The direct reaction of metals with H_{2} is a step in catalytic hydrogenation.

For solutions, classic example involves Vaska's complex:

Ir^{I}Cl(CO)(PPh_{3})_{2} + H_{2} ⇌ H_{2}Ir^{III}Cl(CO)(PPh_{3})_{2}

Oxidative addition also can occur to dimetallic complexes, e.g.:

Co_{2}(CO)_{8} + H_{2} ⇌ 2 HCo(CO)_{4}

Many acids participate in oxidative additions, as illustrated by the addition of HCl to Vaska's complex:

Ir^{I}Cl(CO)(PPh_{3})_{2} + HCl → HIr^{III}Cl_{2}(CO)(PPh_{3})_{2}

=== Heterolytic cleavage of dihydrogen ===
Some metal hydrides form when a metal complex is treated with hydrogen in the presence of a base. The reaction involves no changes in the oxidation state of the metal and can be viewed as splitting H_{2} into hydride (which binds to the metal) and proton (which binds to the base).

ML_{n}^{x+} + base + H_{2} ⇌ HML_{n}^{(x-1)+} + Hbase^{+}

Such reaction are assumed to involve the intermediacy of dihydrogen complexes. Bifunctional catalysts activate H_{2} in this way.

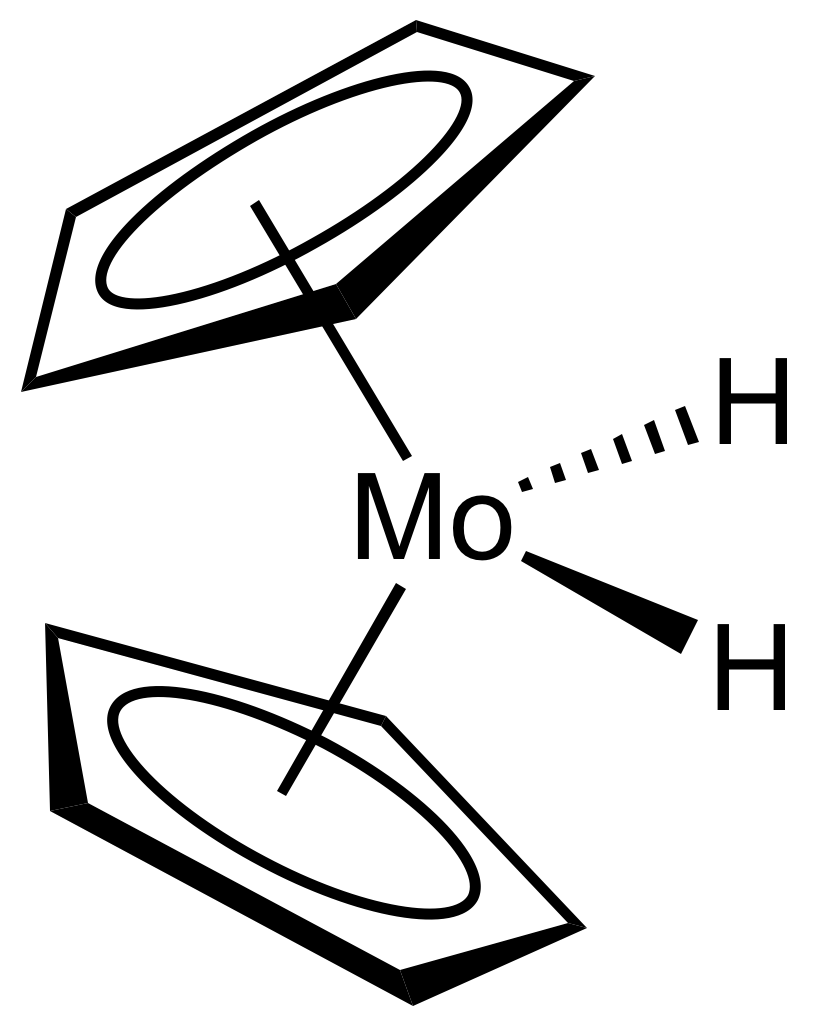
Molybdocene dihydride is produced using NaBH_{4} as the hydride source

== Thermodynamic considerations ==
Some M-H Bond Dissociation Energies and pK_{a}'s of 18e^{−} Metal Hydrides(MeCN solution)
Metal hydride complex	BDE (kJ/mol)	pK_{a}
H-CpCr(CO)_{3}	257	13.3
H-CpMo(CO)_{3}	290	13.9
H-CpW(CO)_{3}	303	16.1
H-Mn(CO)_{5}	285	14.1
H-Re(CO)_{5}	313	21.1
H-FeH(CO)_{4}	283	11.4
H-CpFe(CO)_{2}	239	19.4
H-CpRu(CO)_{2}	272	20.2
H-Co(CO)_{4}	278	8.3

The values shift by <6 kJ/mol upon substitution of CO by a phosphine ligand.

The M-H bond can in principle cleave to produce a proton, hydrogen radical, or hydride.

HML_{n} ⇌ ML_{n}^{−} + H^{+}

HML_{n} ⇌ ML_{n} + H

HML_{n} ⇌ ML_{n}^{+} + H^{−}

Although these properties are interrelated, they are not interdependent. A metal hydride can be a thermodynamically a weak acid and a weak H^{−} donor; it could also be strong in one category but not the other or strong in both. The H^{−} strength of a hydride also known as its hydride donor ability or hydricity corresponds to the hydride's Lewis base strength. Not all hydrides are powerful Lewis bases. The base strength of hydrides vary as much as the pK_{a} of protons. This hydricity can be measured by heterolytic cleaving hydrogen between a metal complex and base with a known pK_{a} then measuring the resulting equilibrium. This presupposes that the hydride doesn't heterolytically or homolytically react with itself to reform hydrogen. A complex would homolytically react with itself if the homolytic M-H bond is worth less than half of the homolytic H-H bond. Even if the homolytic bond strength is above that threshold the complex is still susceptible to radical reaction pathways.

2 HML_{n}^{z} ⇌ 2 ML_{n}^{z} + H_{2}

A complex will heterolytically react with itself when its simultaneously a strong acid and a strong hydride. This conversion results in disproportionation producing a pair of complexes with oxidation states that differ by two electrons. Further electrochemical reactions are possible.

2HML_{n}^{z} ⇌ ML_{n}^{z+1} + ML_{n}^{z-1} + H_{2}

As noted some complexes heterolytically cleave dihydrogen in the presence of a base. A portion of these complexes result in hydride complexes acidic enough to be deprotonated a second time by the base. In this situation the starting complex can be reduced by two electrons with hydrogen and base. Even if the hydride is not acidic enough to be deprotonated it can homolytically react with itself as discussed above for an overall one electron reduction.

Two deprotonations: ML_{n}^{z} + H_{2} + 2Base ⇌ ML_{n}^{z-2} + 2H^{+}base

Deprotonation followed by homolysis: 2ML_{n}^{z} + H_{2} + 2base ⇌ 2ML_{n}^{z-1} + 2H^{+}Base

=== Hydricity ===
The affinity for a hydride ligand for a Lewis acid is called its hydricity:

ML_{n}H^{n−} ⇌ ML_{n}^{(n+1)−} + H^{−}

Since hydride does not exist as a stable anion in solution, this equilibrium constant (and its associated free energy) are calculated from measurable equilibria. The reference point is the hydricity of a proton, which in acetonitrile solution is calculated at −76 kcal mol^{−1}:

H^{+} + H^{−} ⇌ H_{2} ΔG_{298} = −76 kcal mol^{−1}

Relative to a proton, most cations exhibit a lower affinity for H^{−}. Some examples include:

[Ni(dppe)_{2}]^{2+} + H^{−} ⇌ [HNi(dppe)_{2}]^{+} ΔG_{298} = −63 kcal mol^{−1}
[Ni(dmpe)_{2}]^{2+} + H^{−} ⇌ [HNi(dmpe)_{2}]^{+} ΔG_{298} = −50.7 kcal mol^{−1}
[Pt(dppe)_{2}]^{2+} + H^{−} ⇌ [HPt(dppe)_{2}]^{+} ΔG_{298} = −53 kcal mol^{−1}
[Pt(dmpe)_{2}]^{2+} + H^{−} ⇌ [HPt(dmpe)_{2}]^{+} ΔG_{298} = −42.6 kcal mol^{−1}

These data suggest that [HPt(dmpe)_{2}]^{+} would be a strong hydride donor, reflecting the relatively high stability of [Pt(dmpe)_{2}]^{2+}.

== Kinetics and mechanism ==
The rates of proton-transfer to and between metal complexes are often slow. Many hydrides are inaccessible to study through Bordwell thermodynamic cycles. As a result, kinetic studies are employed to elucidate both the relevant thermodynamic parameters. Generally hydrides derived from first row transition metals display the most rapid kinetics followed by the second and third row metal complexes.

== Structure and bonding ==
The determination of structures of metal hydrides can be challenging since hydride ligands do not scatter X-ray well, especially in comparison to the attached metal. Consequently M-H distances are often underestimated, especially in early studies. Often the presence of a hydride ligand was deduced by the absence of a ligand at an apparent coordination site. Classically, the structures of metal hydrides was addressed by neutron diffraction since hydrogen strongly scatters neutrons.

Metal complexes containing terminal hydrides are common. In bi- and polynuclear compounds, hydrides usually are bridging ligands. Of these bridging hydrides many are oligomeric, such as Stryker's reagent. [(Ph_{3}P)CuH]_{6} and clusters such as [Rh_{6}(PR_{3})_{6}H_{12}]^{2+}. The final bonding motif is the non-classical dihydride also known as sigma bond dihydrogen adducts or simply dihydrogen complexes. The [W(PR_{3})_{2}(CO)_{3}(H_{2})] complex was the first well characterized example of both a non-classical dihydride and sigma-bond complex in general. X-ray diffraction is generally insufficient to locate hydrides in crystal structures and thus their location must be assumed. It requires Neutron diffraction to unambiguously locate a hydride near a heavy atom crystallographically. Non-classical hydrides have also been studied with a variety of variable temperature NMR techniques and HD Couplings.

Classical terminal: M—H

Classical bridging: M—H—M

nonclassical: M—H_{2}

== Spectroscopy ==
Late transition metal hydrides characteristically show up-field shifts in their proton NMR spectra. It is common for the M-H signal to appear between δ-5 and -25 with many examples outside this range but generally all appear below 0 ppm. The large shifts arise from the influence of the excited states and due to strong spin–orbit coupling (in contrast, ^{1}H NMR shifts for organic compounds typically occur in the range δ12-1). At one extreme is the 16e complex IrHCl_{2}(PMe(t-Bu)_{2})_{2} with a shift of -50.5. At the other extreme of large spin-orbit deshielding is a uranium hydride with a shift of +150. The signals often exhibit spin–spin coupling to other ligands, e.g. phosphines.

Metal hydrides, when not bridging to another element i.e. terminal metal hydrides, exhibit IR bands in the range of 2200 cm^{−1} to 1500 cm^{−1} for ν_{M-H}, although the intensities are variable and the frequencies are dependent on the electronegativity of the metal, with more ionic hydrides with longer metal-hydrogen distances having lower wavenumber absorptions. Paramagnetic complexes with a terminal metal-hydride tend to have longer metal-hydride distances and lower wavenumber absorptions than comparable diamagnetic complexes. These signals can be identified by deuterium labeling. When the hydride bridges between two or three metals, the infrared absorption usually occurs below 1600 cm^{−1} although the intensity is lower and the band often hidden by other absorptions.

== History ==
An ill-defined copper hydride had been described in the 1844 as resulting from treatment of copper salts with hypophosphorous acid. It was subsequently found that hydrogen gas was absorbed by mixtures of transition metal salts and Grignard reagents.

The first well defined metal hydrido complex was H_{2}Fe(CO)_{4}, obtained by the low temperature protonation of an iron carbonyl anion. The next reported hydride complex was (C_{5}H_{5})_{2}ReH. The latter complex was characterized by NMR spectroscopy, which demonstrated the utility of this technique in the study of metal hydride complexes. In 1957, Joseph Chatt, Bernard L. Shaw, and L. A. Duncanson described trans-PtHCl(PEt_{3})_{2} the first non-organometallic hydride (i.e., lacking a metal-carbon bond). It was shown to be air-stable, correcting long-held prejudice that metal hydrides would be unstable.
