= Strontium hydride =

Names
- IUPAC name Strontium hydride

Identifiers
CAS Number	13598-33-9
3D model (JSmol)	Interactive image
ChemSpider	16787720
ECHA InfoCard	100.033.681
EC Number	237-065-1
PubChem CID	83606
UN number	1409
- InChI: InChI=1S/Sr.2H Key: ONYCUIABXVBCTR-UHFFFAOYSA-N; InChI=1/Sr.2H/rH2Sr/h1H2
- SMILES: [SrH2]

Properties
Chemical formula	SrH_{2}
Molar mass	89.64 g·mol^{−1}
Appearance	white crystal
Solubility in water	reacts (produces hydrogen gas and strontium hydroxide
Vapor pressure	8 mmHg (1.1 kPa) (99% purity, 700 °C (1,292 °F))

Hazards
- GHS labelling
Pictograms	(GHS02: Flammable) (GHS05: Corrosive)
Signal word	Danger
Hazard statements	H228, H260, H314
Precautionary statements	P101, P102, P103, P231+P232, P303+P361+P353, P305+P351+P338, P403+P233, P422, P501

Related compounds
Other cations	beryllium hydride; magnesium hydride; calcium hydride; barium hydride
- Except where otherwise noted, data are given for materials in their standard state (at 25 °C [77 °F], 100 kPa). Infobox references

Strontium hydride is an inorganic compound with a chemical formula SrH_{2}.

== Preparation ==
Strontium hydride can be prepared by combining strontium and hydrogen:

Sr + H_{2} → SrH_{2}

This reaction must be performed in oxygen free conditions. Optimal yields (99%+) were only achieved with redistilled strontium at temperatures between 200 and 250 °C (392 and 482 °F) using hydrogen prepared electrolytically, with all oxygen catalytically removed, and dried by passing through phosphorus pentoxide (P_{2}O_{5}).

Strontium hydride reacts with water and produces hydrogen and strontium hydroxide:

SrH_{2} + 2 H_{2}O → 2 H_{2} + Sr(OH)_{2}
