= Hydrolith =

Hydrolith may refer to:

- the philosopher's stone
- a trade name for calcium hydride
- a technique used in immersion lithography
