= Titanium(IV) hydride =

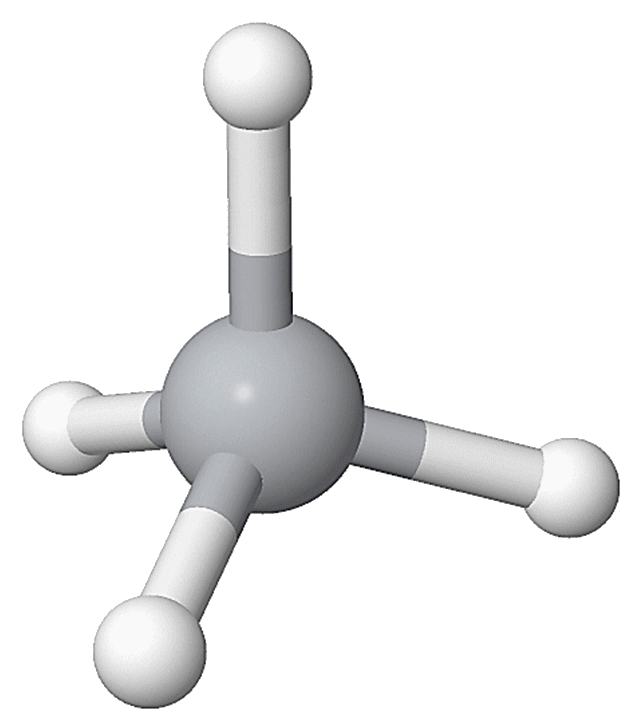

Names
- Systematic IUPAC name Titanium(IV) hydride
- Other names: Titanium tetrahydride; Titane

Identifiers
CAS Number	14902-91-1
3D model (JSmol)	Interactive image
ChemSpider	163222
ECHA InfoCard	100.035.414
EC Number	238-972-5
PubChem CID	187779
UN number	1871
CompTox Dashboard (EPA)	DTXSID90912148 DTXSID1094016, DTXSID90912148
- InChI: InChI=1S/Ti.4H Key: XOOJFLWSRHQYJN-UHFFFAOYSA-N
- SMILES: [TiH4]

Properties
Chemical formula	TiH_{4}
Molar mass	51.899 g·mol^{−1}
Appearance	Colourless gas
Solubility in water	Reacts

Related compounds
Other anions	Titanium(IV) fluoride; Titanium(IV) chloride; Titanium(IV) bromide; Titanium(IV) iodide
Related compounds	Germane; Germyl; Plumbane; Silane; Stannane
- Except where otherwise noted, data are given for materials in their standard state (at 25 °C [77 °F], 100 kPa). Infobox references

Titanium(IV) hydride (systematically named titanium tetrahydride) is an inorganic compound with the empirical chemical formula TiH_{4}. It has not yet been obtained in bulk, hence its bulk properties remain unknown. However, molecular titanium(IV) hydride has been isolated in solid gas matrices. The molecular form is a colourless gas, and very unstable toward thermal decomposition. As such the compound is not well characterised, although many of its properties have been calculated via computational chemistry.

== Synthesis and stability ==
Titanium(IV) hydride was first produced in 1963 by the photodissociation of mixtures of TiCl_{4} and H_{2}, followed by immediate mass spectrometry. Rapid analysis was required as titanium(IV) hydride is extremely unstable. Computational analysis of TiH_{4} has given a theoretical bond dissociation energy (relative to M+4H) of 132 kcal/mol (550 kJ/mol). As the dissociation energy of H_{2} is 104 kcal/mol (440 kJ/mol) the instability of TiH_{4} can be expected to be thermodynamic; with it dissociating to metallic titanium and hydrogen:

TiH_{4} → Ti + 2 H_{2} (76 kcal/mol (320 kJ/mol))

TiH_{4}, along with other unstable molecular titanium hydrides, (TiH, TiH_{2}, TiH_{3} and polymeric species) has been isolated at low temperature following laser ablation of titanium.

== Structure ==
It is suspected that within solid titanium(IV) hydride, the molecules form aggregations (polymers), being connected by covalent bonds. Calculations suggest that TiH_{4} is prone to dimerisation. This is largely attributed to the electron deficiency of the monomer and the small size of the hydride ligands; which allows dimerisation to take place with a very low energy barrier as there is a negligible increase in inter-ligand repulsion.

The dimer is a calculated to be a fluxional molecule rapidly inter-converting between a number of forms, all of which display bridging hydrogens. This is an example of three-center two-electron bonding.

Monomeric titanium(IV) hydride is the simplest transition metal molecule that displays sd^{3} orbital hybridisation.
