= Zinc hydride =

Names
- IUPAC name Zinc(II) hydride
- Systematic IUPAC name Zinc dihydride
- Other names Zinc hydride Zincane

Identifiers
CAS Number	14018-82-7
3D model (JSmol)	Interactive image
ChemSpider	10806557
PubChem CID	22056524
CompTox Dashboard (EPA)	DTXSID10622095
- InChI: InChI=1S/Zn.2H Key: ZULTYUIALNTCSA-UHFFFAOYSA-N
- SMILES: [ZnH2]

Properties
Chemical formula	ZnH_{2}
Molar mass	67.425 g/mol
Appearance	White crystals

Structure
Coordination geometry	linear at Zn
Molecular shape	linear
Dipole moment	0 D

Related compounds
Related compounds	Mercury(II) hydride Cadmium(II) hydride
- Except where otherwise noted, data are given for materials in their standard state (at 25 °C [77 °F], 100 kPa). verify (what is ?) Infobox references

Zinc hydride is an inorganic compound with the chemical formula ZnH_{2}. It is a white, odourless solid which slowly decomposes into its elements at room temperature; despite this it is the most stable of the binary first row transition metal hydrides. A variety of coordination compounds containing Zn–H bonds are used as reducing agents, but ZnH_{2} itself has no common applications.

== Discovery and synthesis ==
Zinc(II) hydride was first synthesized in 1947 by Hermann Schlesinger, via a reaction between dimethylzinc Zn(CH_{3})_{2} and lithium aluminium hydride Li[AlH_{4}]; a process which was somewhat hazardous due to the pyrophoric nature of Zn(CH_{3})_{2}.

Zn(CH_{3})_{2} + 2 Li[AlH_{4}] → ZnH_{2} + 2 Li[AlH_{3}CH_{3}]

Later methods were predominantly salt metathesis reactions between zinc halides and alkali metal hydrides, which are significantly safer. Examples include:

ZnBr_{2} + 2 LiH → ZnH_{2} + 2 LiBr
ZnI_{2} + 2 NaH + → ZnH_{2} + 2 NaI
ZnI_{2} + 2 Li[AlH_{4}] → ZnH_{2} + AlH_{3} + 2 LiI

Small quantities of gaseous zinc(II) hydride have also been produced by laser ablation of zinc under a hydrogen atmosphere and other high energy techniques. These methods have been used to assess its gas phase properties.

== Chemical properties ==
=== Structure ===
New evidence suggests that in zinc(II) hydride, elements form a one-dimensional network (polymer), being connected by covalent bonds. Other lower metal hydrides polymerise in a similar fashion (cf. aluminium hydride). Solid zinc(II) hydride is the irreversible autopolymerisation product of the molecular form, and the molecular form cannot be isolated in concentration. Solubilising zinc(II) hydride in non-aqueous solvents, involve adducts with molecular zinc(II) hydride, such as ZnH_{2}·H_{2} in liquid hydrogen.

=== Stability ===
Zinc(II) hydride slowly decomposes to metallic zinc and hydrogen gas at room temperature, with decomposition becoming rapid if it is heated above 90°C.

ZnH_{2} → Zn + H_{2}

It is readily oxidised and is sensitive to both air and moisture; being hydrolysed slowly by water but violently by aqueous acids, which indicates possible passivation via the formation of a surface layer of ZnO. Despite this older samples may be pyrophoric. Zinc hydride can therefore be considered metastable at best, however it is still the most stable of all the binary first row transition metal hydrides (cf. titanium(IV) hydride).

== Molecular form ==
Molecular zinc(II) hydride, ZnH_{2}, has been identified as a volatile product of the acidified reduction of zinc ions with sodium borohydride. This reaction is similar to the acidified reduction with lithium aluminium hydride, however a greater fraction of the generated zinc(II) hydride is in the molecular form. This can be attributed to a slower reaction rate, which prevents a polymerising concentration of building over the progression of the reaction. This follows earlier experiments in direct synthesis from the elements. The reaction of excited zinc atoms with molecular hydrogen in the gas phase was studied by Breckenridge et al using laserpump-probe techniques. Owing to its relative thermal stability, molecular zinc(II) hydride is included in the short list of molecular metal hydrides, which have been successfully identified in the gas phase (that is, not limited to matrix isolation).

The average Zn–H bond energy was recently calculated to be 51.24 kcal mol^{−1}, while the H–H bond energy is 103.3 kcal mol^{−1}. Therefore, the overall reaction is nearly ergoneutral.

Zn(g) + H_{2}(g) → ZnH_{2}(g)

Molecular zinc hydride in the gas phase was found to be linear with a Zn–H bond length of 153.5 pm.

The molecule can be found a singlet ground state of ^{1}Σ_{g}^{+}.

Quantum chemical calculations predict the molecular form to exist in a doubly hydrogen-bridged, dimeric groundstate, with little or no formational energy barrier. The dimer can be called di-μ-hydrido-bis(hydridozinc), per IUPAC additive nomenclature.
