= Hydrogen compounds =

Compounds containing hydrogen

Hydrogen compounds are compounds containing the element hydrogen. In these compounds, hydrogen can form in the +1 and −1 oxidation states. Hydrogen can form compounds both ionically and in covalent substances. It is a part of many organic compounds such as hydrocarbons as well as water and other organic substances. The H^{+} ion is often called a proton because it has one proton and no electrons, although the proton does not move freely. Brønsted–Lowry acids are capable of donating H^{+} ions to bases.

== Covalent and organic compounds ==
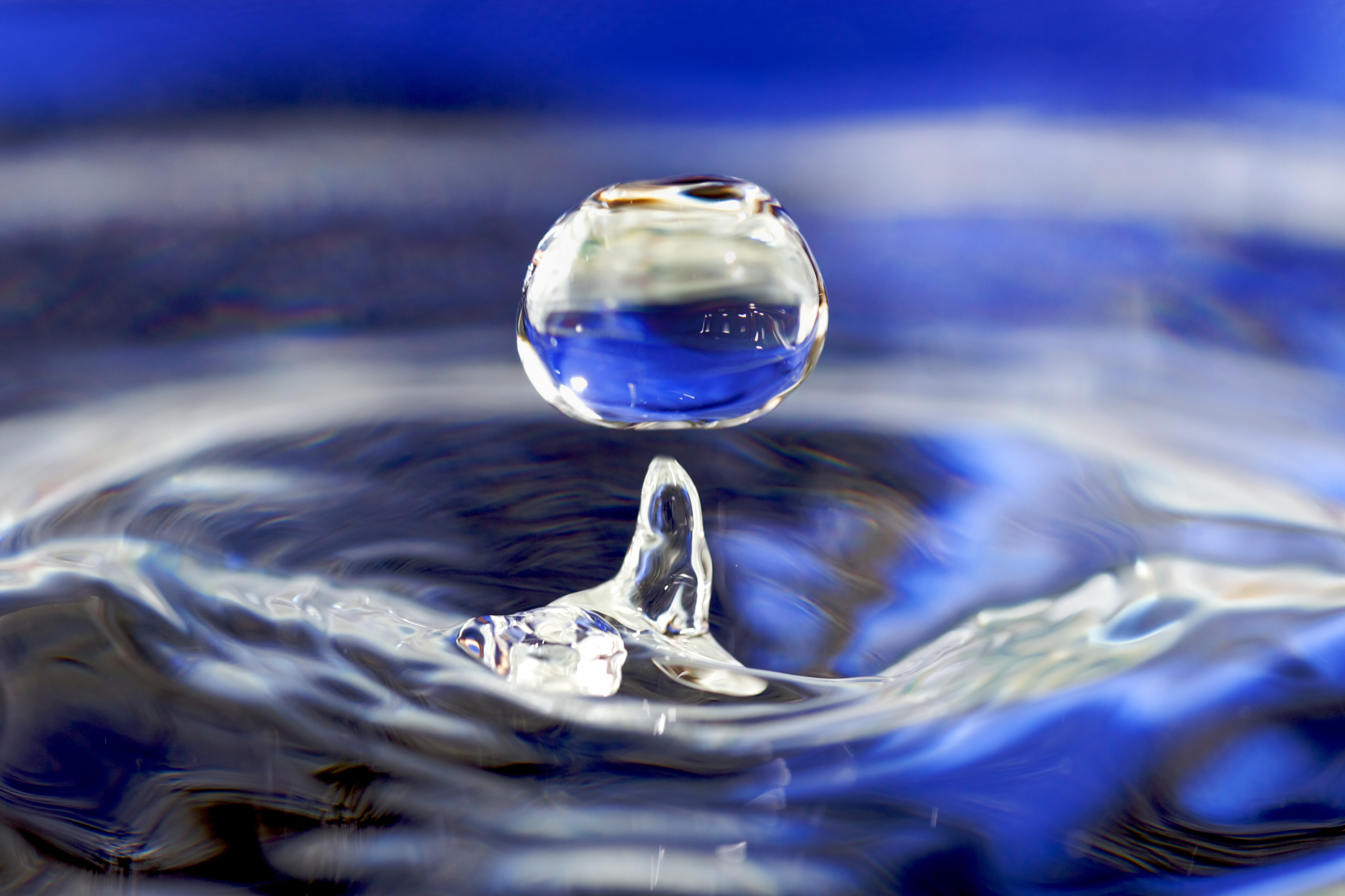
Water molecules have two hydrogen atoms and one oxygen atom.

While H_{2} is not very reactive under standard conditions, it does form compounds with most elements. Hydrogen can form compounds with elements that are more electronegative, such as halogens (F, Cl, Br, I), or oxygen; in these compounds hydrogen takes on a partial positive charge. When bonded to a more electronegative element, particularly fluorine, oxygen, or nitrogen, hydrogen can participate in a form of medium-strength noncovalent bonding with another electronegative element with a lone pair, a phenomenon called hydrogen bonding that is critical to the stability of many biological molecules. Hydrogen also forms compounds with less electronegative elements, such as metals and metalloids, where it takes on a partial negative charge. These compounds are often known as hydrides.

Water contains two hydrogen atoms covalently bonded to one oxygen atom, and is one of the most well-studied compounds.

Hydrogen is highly soluble in many rare earth and transition metals and is soluble in both nanocrystalline and amorphous metals. Hydrogen solubility in metals is influenced by local distortions or impurities in the crystal lattice. These properties may be useful when hydrogen is purified by passage through hot palladium disks, but the gas's high solubility is a metallurgical problem, contributing to the embrittlement of many metals, complicating the design of pipelines and storage tanks.

=== Hydrocarbons ===
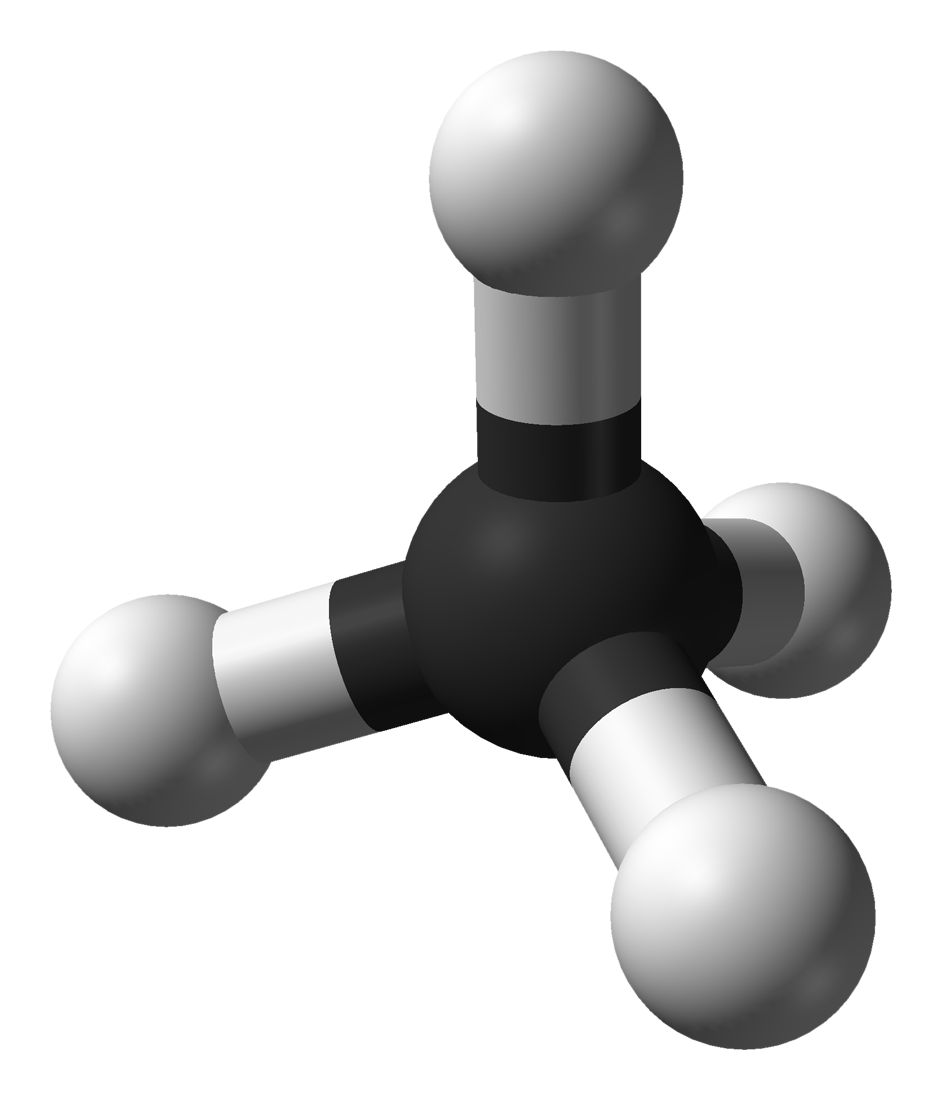
Methane is a hydrocarbon.

Hydrogen forms a vast array of compounds with carbon called the hydrocarbons, and an even vaster array with heteroatoms that, because of their general association with living things, are called organic compounds. The study of their properties is known as organic chemistry and their study in the context of living organisms is known as biochemistry. By some definitions, "organic" compounds are only required to contain carbon. However, most of them also contain hydrogen, and because it is the carbon-hydrogen bond that gives this class of compounds most of its particular chemical characteristics, carbon-hydrogen bonds are required in some definitions of the word "organic" in chemistry. Millions of hydrocarbons are known, and they are usually formed by complicated pathways that seldom involve elemental hydrogen.

== Hydrides ==
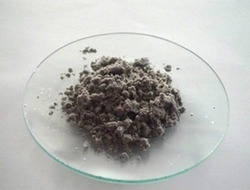
A sample of sodium hydride

Compounds of hydrogen are often called hydrides, a term that is used fairly loosely. The term "hydride" suggests that the H atom has acquired a negative or anionic character, denoted H^{−}, and is used when hydrogen forms a compound with a more electropositive element. The existence of the hydride anion, suggested by Gilbert N. Lewis in 1916 for group 1 and 2 salt-like hydrides, was demonstrated by Moers in 1920 by the electrolysis of molten lithium hydride (LiH), producing a stoichiometric quantity of hydrogen at the anode. For hydrides other than group 1 and 2 metals, the term is quite misleading, considering the low electronegativity of hydrogen. An exception in group 2 hydrides is BeH_{2}, which is polymeric. In lithium aluminium hydride, the [AlH_{4}]^{−} anion carries hydridic centers firmly attached to the Al(III).

Although hydrides can be formed with almost all main-group elements, the number and combination of possible compounds varies widely; for example, more than 100 binary borane hydrides are known, but only one binary aluminium hydride. Binary indium hydride has not yet been identified, although larger complexes exist.

In inorganic chemistry, hydrides can also serve as bridging ligands that link two metal centers in a coordination complex. This function is particularly common in group 13 elements, especially in boranes (boron hydrides) and aluminium complexes, as well as in clustered carboranes.

== Protons and acids ==
Oxidation of hydrogen removes its electron and gives H^{+}, which contains no electrons and a nucleus which is usually composed of one proton. That is why H^{+} is often called a proton. This species is central to discussion of acids. Under the Brønsted–Lowry acid–base theory, acids are proton donors, while bases are proton acceptors.

A bare proton, H^{+}, cannot exist in solution or in ionic crystals because of its unstoppable attraction to other atoms or molecules with electrons. Except at the high temperatures associated with plasmas, such protons cannot be removed from the electron clouds of atoms and molecules, and will remain attached to them. However, the term 'proton' is sometimes used loosely and metaphorically to refer to positively charged or cationic hydrogen attached to other species in this fashion, and as such is denoted "H^{+}" without any implication that any single protons exist freely as a species.

To avoid the implication of the naked "solvated proton" in solution, acidic aqueous solutions are sometimes considered to contain a less unlikely fictitious species, termed the "hydronium ion" ([H_{3}O]^{+}). However, even in this case, such solvated hydrogen cations are more realistically conceived as being organized into clusters that form species closer to [H_{9}O_{4}]^{+}. Other oxonium ions are found when water is in acidic solution with other solvents.

Although exotic on Earth, one of the most common ions in the universe is the H^{+}_{3} ion, known as protonated molecular hydrogen or the trihydrogen cation.

== See also ==
- Binary compounds of hydrogen
- Helium compounds
