= Erbium hydride =

Erbium hydride may refer to:

- Erbium dihydride (Erbium(II) hydride), ErH_{2}
- Erbium trihydride (Erbium(III) hydride), ErH_{3}
