= Magnesium hydride =

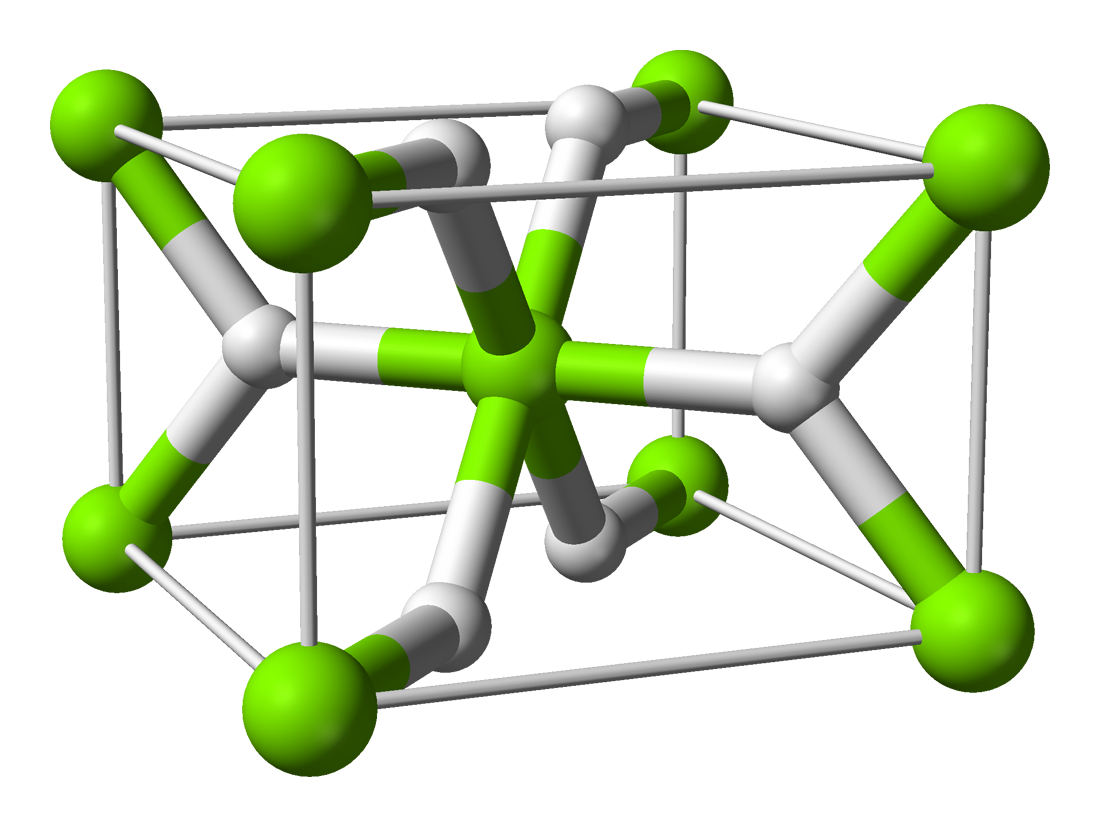

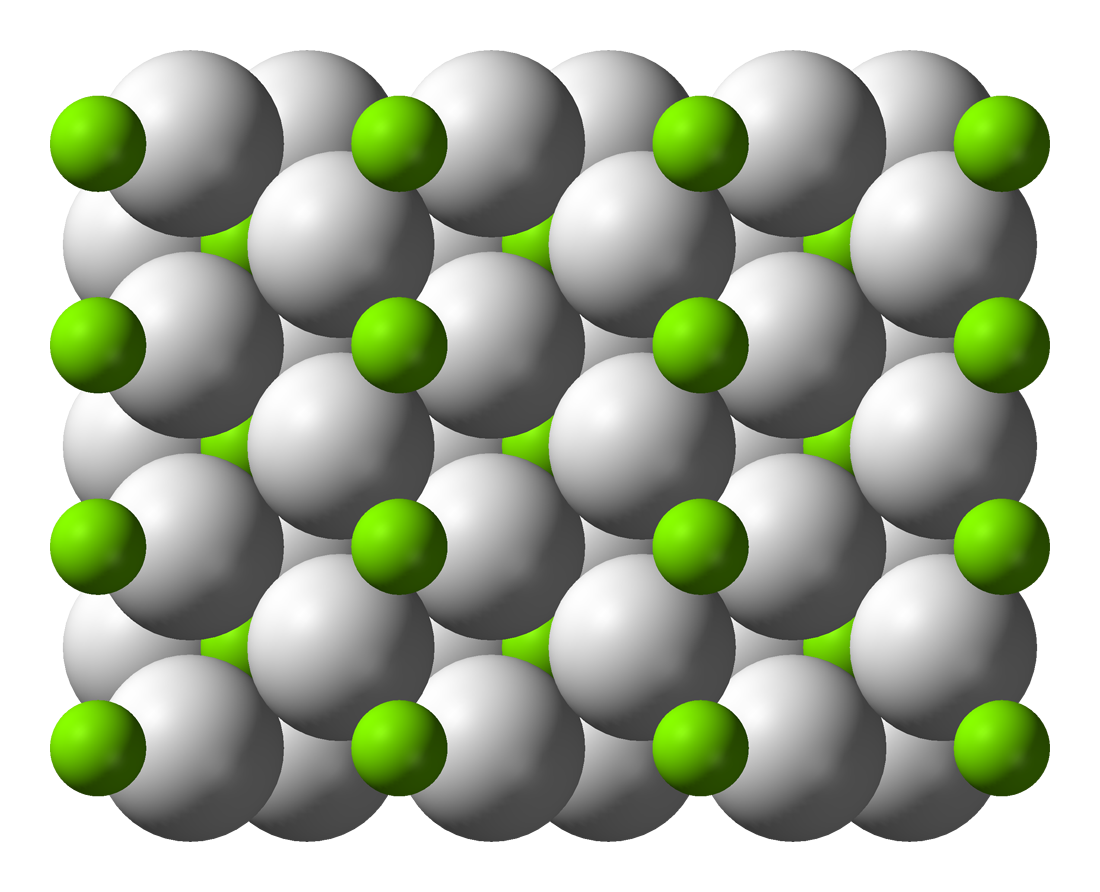

Names
- IUPAC name Magnesium hydride

Identifiers
CAS Number	7693-27-8
3D model (JSmol)	Interactive image
ChEBI	CHEBI:25107
ChemSpider	16787263
ECHA InfoCard	100.028.824
EC Number	231-705-3
PubChem CID	107663
UNII	Y93032D743
- InChI: InChI=1S/Mg.2H Key: RSHAOIXHUHAZPM-UHFFFAOYSA-N; InChI=1/Mg.2H/rH2Mg/h1H2 Key: RSHAOIXHUHAZPM-HZAFDXBCAG
- SMILES: [MgH2]

Properties
Chemical formula	MgH_{2}
Molar mass	26.321 g·mol^{−1}
Appearance	white crystals
Density	1.45 g/cm^{3}
Melting point	327 °C (621 °F; 600 K) decomposes
Solubility in water	decomposes
Solubility	insoluble in ether

Structure
Crystal structure	tetragonal

Thermochemistry
Heat capacity (C)	35.4 J/mol K
Std molar entropy (S^{⦵}_{298})	31.1 J/mol K
Std enthalpy of formation (Δ_{f}H^{⦵}_{298})	−75.2 kJ/mol
Gibbs free energy (Δ_{f}G^{⦵})	−35.9 kJ/mol

Hazards
- Occupational safety and health (OHS/OSH)
Main hazards	pyrophoric

Related compounds
Other cations	Beryllium hydride Calcium hydride Strontium hydride Barium hydride
Related Magnesium hydrides	Magnesium monohydride Mg_{4}H_{6}
- Except where otherwise noted, data are given for materials in their standard state (at 25 °C [77 °F], 100 kPa). verify (what is ?) Infobox references

Magnesium hydride is the chemical compound with the molecular formula MgH_{2}. It contains 7.66% by weight of hydrogen and has been studied as a potential hydrogen storage medium.

For comparison, one cubic meter can contain 45 kg of hydrogen pressurized at 700 atm, 70 kg of liquid hydrogen, or up to 106 kg of hydrogen bound in magnesium hydride.

Magnesium hydride is also investigated for use in thermobaric weapons and incendiary weapons, standalone or as a mixture with a solid oxidizer; China tested a (non-nuclear) "hydrogen bomb" using the substance. It can be also used in emulsion explosives as a source of bubbles and additional fuel. It can be added to improve heat release of aluminized explosive compositions and to improve burn rate of propellants.

== Preparation ==
In 1951 preparation from the elements was first reported involving direct hydrogenation of Mg metal at high pressure and temperature (200 atmospheres, 500 °C) with MgI_{2} catalyst:

Mg + H_{2} → MgH_{2}

Lower temperature production from Mg and H_{2} using nanocrystalline Mg produced in ball mills has been investigated. Other preparations include:

- the hydrogenation of magnesium anthracene under mild conditions:

Mg(anthracene) + H_{2} → MgH_{2}

- the reaction of diethylmagnesium with lithium aluminium hydride
- product of complexed MgH_{2} e.g. MgH_{2}.THF by the reaction of phenylsilane and dibutyl magnesium in ether or hydrocarbon solvents in the presence of THF or TMEDA as ligand.

== Structure and bonding ==
The room temperature form α-MgH_{2} has a rutile structure. There are at least four high pressure forms: γ-MgH_{2} with α-PbO_{2} structure, cubic β-MgH_{2} with Pa-3 space group, orthorhombic HP1 with Pbc2_{1} space group and orthorhombic HP2 with Pnma space group. Additionally a non stoichiometric MgH_{(2-δ)} has been characterised, but this appears to exist only for very small particles
(bulk MgH_{2} is essentially stoichiometric, as it can only accommodate very low concentrations of H vacancies).

The bonding in the rutile form is sometimes described as being partially covalent in nature rather than purely ionic; charge density determination by synchrotron x-ray diffraction indicates that the magnesium atom is fully ionised and spherical in shape and the hydride ion is elongated. Molecular forms of magnesium hydride, MgH, MgH_{2}, Mg_{2}H, Mg_{2}H_{2}, Mg_{2}H_{3}, and Mg_{2}H_{4} molecules identified by their vibrational spectra have been found in matrix isolated samples at below 10 K, formed following laser ablation of magnesium in the presence of hydrogen. The Mg_{2}H_{4} molecule has a bridged structure analogous to dimeric aluminium hydride, Al_{2}H_{6}.

== Reactions ==
MgH_{2} readily reacts with water to form hydrogen gas:

MgH_{2} + 2 H_{2}O → 2 H_{2} + Mg(OH)_{2}

At 287 °C it decomposes to produce H_{2} at 1 bar pressure. The high temperature required is seen as a limitation in the use of MgH_{2} as a reversible hydrogen storage medium:

MgH_{2} → Mg + H_{2}
