= Group 14 hydride =

Chemical compound with hydrogen and carbon group atoms

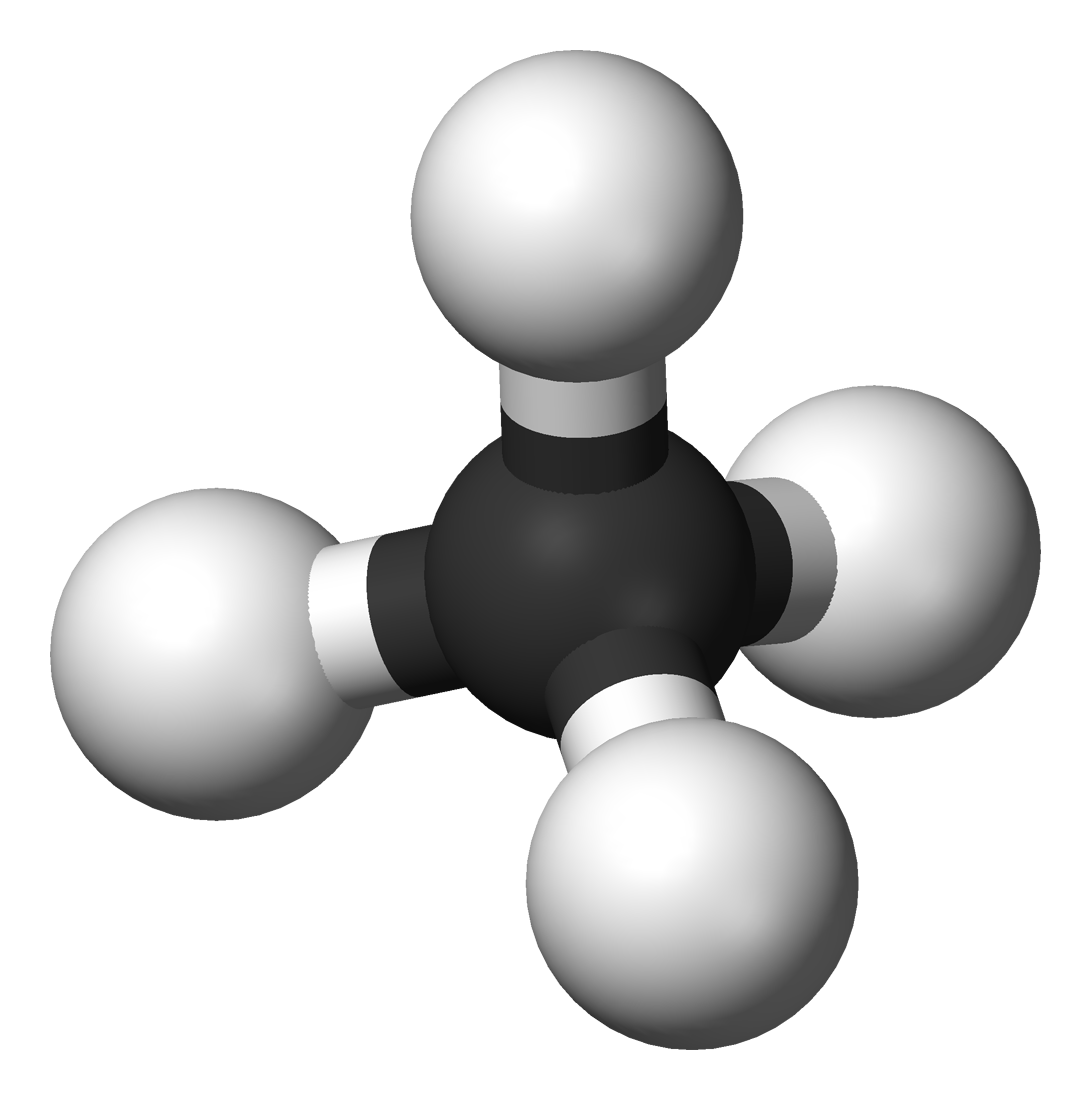
Structure of methane, silane, germane, and stannane.

Group 14 hydrides are chemical compounds with a group 14 element directly bonded to hydrogen. The elements of group 14 are carbon, silicon, germanium, tin, and lead. This article focuses on parent compounds with the formula EH_{n}^{x}, where x can reflect neutral members or anions and cations.

== Charge-neutral hydrides ==
=== Monohydrides ===
Monohydrides are rare for the group 14 elements. Methylidyne (CH) has been observed in the interstellar medium. With one unpaired electron, it is paramagnetic.

=== Dihydrides ===
While PbH_{2} remains uncharacterized, organic derivatives have been examined by X-ray crystallography including (C_{6}H_{3}-2,6-(mesityl)_{2})PbH dimer

Compound	Chemical formula	Molecular geometry	comment
Methylene	CH_{2}	bent (134°)	triplet ground state
Silylene	SiH_{2}	bent (92°)	singlet ground state
Germylene	GeH_{2}	bent	singlet ground state
Stanylene	SnH_{2}	bent	singlet ground state
Plumbylene	PbH_{2}	unknown	unknown

=== Trihydrides ===
Compound	Chemical formula	Molecular geometry	comment
Methyl	CH_{3}	pyramidal	doublet ground state
Silyl radical	SiH_{3}	pyramidal	doublet ground state
Silanide	SiH^{−}_{3}	pyramidal	
Germyl	GeH_{3}	pyramidal	doublet ground state
Stanyl	SnH_{3}	pyramidal	doublet ground state
Plumbyl	PbH_{3}	unknown	unknown

=== Tetrahydrides ===
The tetrahydrides have the chemical formula XH_{4}, with X representing any of the carbon family. In the case of C, Si, Ge, and Sn, the tetrahydrides are tetrahedral monomers. PbH_{4} has not been verified experimentally, but it is predicted to be tetrahedral also on the basis of quantum chemical calculations.

Compound	Chemical formula	Molecular geometry	comment
Methane	CH_{4}	tetrahedral, C-H distance is 108.7 pm	main component of natural gas
Silane	SiH_{4}	ttetrahedral, Si-H distance is 147 pm	precursor to silicon-based microelectronics
Germane	GeH_{4}	tetrahedral, Ge-H distance is 152.5 pm	precursor to germanium-based microelectronics
Stannane	SnH_{4}	tetrahedral, Sn-H distance is 171 pm	academic interest
Plumbane	PbH_{4}	uncertain	structure has not been verified experimentally

== Anionic and cationic hydrides ==
Fragment of the BaSiH_{6} lattice. The [SiH_{6}]^{2−} center is apparent as the turquoise sphere (Si) surrounded by six white spheres (H). The H atoms link also to Ba^{2+} (red spheres).

Many anionic hydrides have been evaluated computationally but very few can be isolated. In organic chemistry, methyllithium is treated as the equivalent of the carbanion CH_{3}^{-}. Similarly, reagents such as trimethyloxonium tetrafluoroborate are treated as the equivalent of the carbocation CH_{3}^{+}.

Well-characterized hydride anions are salts of [SiH_{6}]^{2-}, an octahedral anion.

== Catenated hydrides ==
Group 14 elements are renown for catenation, i.e. forming chains. The neutral hydrides are no exception. Hydrocarbons are a vast inventory of carbon hydrides. Oligomeric and polymeric silanes (see polysilane) and germanes (see polygermane) are far less extensive but have been shown to exist.

== Bibliography ==
- Greenwood, Norman N.; Earnshaw, Alan (1997). Chemistry of the Elements (2nd ed.). Butterworth-Heinemann. doi:10.1016/C2009-0-30414-6. ISBN 978-0-08-037941-8.
