= Erbium trihydride =

Names
- Other names Erbium hydride

Identifiers
| CAS Number | 13550-53-3 |
| 3D model (JSmol) | Interactive image |
| ChemSpider | 145975 |
| ECHA InfoCard | 100.033.558 |
| EC Number | 236-930-0 |
| PubChem CID | 166844 |
- InChI: InChI=1S/Er.3H/q+3;3*-1 Key: NKYQTHMRTJJBDX-UHFFFAOYSA-N
- SMILES: [H-].[H-].[H-].[Er+3]

Properties
| Chemical formula | ErH_{3} |
| Molar mass | 170.28 g/mol |
| Density | 7.66 g/cm^{3} |

Structure
| Crystal structure | Trigonal, HoH_{3} type |
| Space group | P3̅c1, No. 165 |
| Lattice constant | a = 0.6264 nm, c = 0.6520 nm |
| Formula units (Z) | 6 |
- Except where otherwise noted, data are given for materials in their standard state (at 25 °C [77 °F], 100 kPa). Infobox references

Erbium trihydride is an inorganic compound of erbium and hydrogen with the approximate composition ErH_{3}. It is the hydrogen-rich γ phase of the erbium–hydrogen system and, under ordinary pressure, adopts a trigonal HoH_{3}-type structure. The compound is less thermodynamically stable than erbium dihydride, but metastable ErH_{3} powders and thin films can persist at ambient conditions.

== Preparation ==
Erbium trihydride can be prepared by direct hydrogenation of metallic erbium:

2 Er + 3 H_{2} → 2 ErH_{3}

In one high-pressure preparation, pure erbium was exposed to hydrogen at 15 MPa and 300 °C.

The γ phase forms only at sufficiently high hydrogen chemical potential. In the erbium–hydrogen phase diagram, increasing hydrogen concentration gives the sequence of an α solid solution, the cubic β-ErH_{2} phase, a β + γ two-phase region, and finally γ-ErH_{3} at hydrogen-to-erbium ratios above approximately 2.7.

Metastable ErH_{3} has also been prepared as thin films and powders. Electron-beam-deposited erbium films heated in hydrogen can transform to the trihydride, which may remain intact after the hydrogen overpressure is removed.

== Properties ==
=== Crystal structure ===
At ambient pressure, γ-ErH_{3} adopts the HoH_{3} structure type, space group P3̅c1 (No. 165). Representative lattice parameters are a = 6.264 Å and c = 6.520 Å, with six formula units per unit cell. The erbium atoms form an approximately hexagonal close-packed sublattice. Hydrogen occupies two different types of interstitial sites, displaced from ideal tetrahedral and octahedral positions. The structure differs markedly from cubic β-ErH_{2}, in which the erbium atoms form a face-centred cubic lattice and hydrogen occupies the tetrahedral sites.

=== Stability and thermal decomposition ===
Bulk ErH_{3} is thermodynamically stable only under sufficient hydrogen pressure. Pressure–composition measurements indicate that, at temperatures between approximately 200 and 370 °C, removal of the hydrogen overpressure favors decomposition toward the dihydride.

Thermal-desorption measurements on material of approximate composition ErH_{2.7} show a sequence of γ + β → β → α + β → α as hydrogen is released.

Two principal hydrogen-desorption processes were observed, with activation energies of 160.7 and 212.3 kJ/mol. The lower-temperature feature was associated with loss of the γ phase, while the higher-temperature feature corresponded to decomposition of the β hydride.

=== High-pressure behaviour ===
High-pressure X-ray diffraction shows that the ambient-pressure hexagonal phase transforms to a cubic phase at approximately 15 GPa. The cubic phase has a face-centred cubic erbium sublattice; extrapolation of its equation of state gives a lattice parameter of approximately 5.23 Å at zero pressure. The transition is reversible on decompression.

Later first-principles calculations predict a somewhat more complex sequence, with a monoclinic C2/m phase becoming stable near 15 GPa before transformation to cubic Fm3̅m ErH_{3} at about 40 GPa.

The same calculations find the ambient-pressure P3̅c1 phase to be non-metallic, whereas the predicted high-pressure phases are metallic.

=== Magnetic properties ===
The magnetic properties of ErH_{3} are dominated by the localized 4f electrons of erbium. Magnetic-susceptibility measurements between 1.3 and 4.2 K follow approximately Curie–Weiss behavior, with a Weiss temperature of −1.05 ± 0.05 K, indicating predominantly antiferromagnetic interactions. The measured low-field effective moment is 6.77 ± 0.27 μ_{B} per erbium ion, while the saturation moment is approximately 3.84 ± 0.15 μ_{B}. The reduced values relative to the free Er^{3+} ion arise from the crystal-field splitting of the erbium 4f states.
