= Yttrium hydride =

Identifiers
CAS Number	13598-57-7
3D model (JSmol)	Interactive image
ChemSpider	trihydride: 146001
ECHA InfoCard	100.033.689
EC Number	237-074-0
PubChem CID	trihydride: 166870
CompTox Dashboard (EPA)	DTXSID901015524
- InChI: InChI=1S/Y.3H/q+3;3*-1 Key: OSHLWINJTPLDKQ-UHFFFAOYSA-N
- SMILES: [H-].[H-].[H-].[Y+3]
- Except where otherwise noted, data are given for materials in their standard state (at 25 °C [77 °F], 100 kPa). Infobox references

Yttrium hydride is a compound of hydrogen and yttrium. It is considered to be a part of the class of rare-earth metal hydrides. It exists in several forms, the most common being a metallic compound with formula YH_{2}. YH_{2} has a face-centred cubic structure, and is a metallic compound. Under great pressure, extra hydrogen can combine to yield an insulator with a hexagonal structure, with a formula close to YH_{3}. Hexagonal YH_{3} has a band gap of 2.6 eV. Under pressure of 12 GPa YH_{3} transforms to an intermediate state, and when the pressure increases to 22 GPa another metallic face-centred cubic phase is formed.

In 1996, it was shown that the metal-insulator transition when going from YH_{2} to YH_{3} can be used to change the optical state of windows from non-transparent to transparent. This report spurred a wave of research on metal hydride-based chromogenic materials and smart windows; gasochromic windows reacting to hydrogen gas and electrochromic structures where the transparency can be regulated by applying an external voltage. When containing a substantial amount of oxygen, yttrium hydride is also found to exhibit reversible photochromic properties. This switchable optical property enables their utilization in many technological applications, such as sensors, goggles, and medical devices in addition to the smart windows. According to a research results, the strength of the photochromic response is found to decrease with increasing oxygen concentration in the film accompanied by an optical band gap widening.

Yttrium hydride is being looked at as a high temperature superconductor.

Yttrium hydride is being looked at as a neutron moderator for use in new nuclear reactor designs.
