= Scandium(III) hydride =

Names
- Other names: Scandane; Scandium(III) hydride; Scandium trihydride

Identifiers
CAS Number	43238-07-9
3D model (JSmol)	Interactive image
PubChem CID	18172687
CompTox Dashboard (EPA)	DTXSID30592549
- InChI: InChI=1S/Sc.3H Key: NTLPNEDDYLQQDI-UHFFFAOYSA-N
- SMILES: [ScH3]

Properties
Chemical formula	ScH_{3}
Molar mass	47.97973 g mol^{−1}

Structure
Space group	C_{3v}
Coordination geometry	Trigonal
Molecular shape	Irregular tetrahedral

Related compounds
Related scandiums	Scandium chloride; Scandium fluoride
- Except where otherwise noted, data are given for materials in their standard state (at 25 °C [77 °F], 100 kPa). Infobox references

Scandium trihydride is an unstable molecular chemical compound with the chemical formula ScH_{3}. It has been formed as one of a number of other molecular scandium hydride products at low temperature using laser ablation and identified by infrared spectroscopy. Scandium trihydride has recently been the subject of Dirac–Hartree–Fock relativistic calculation studies, which investigate the stabilities, geometries, and relative energies of hydrides of the formula MH_{3}, MH_{2}, or MH.

== Properties and bonding ==
Scandium trihydride is a quastrigonal planar molecule with three equivalent Sc-H bonds. (C_{3v}) structure an equilibrium distance between Sc and hydrogen of 182.0 pm, the bond angle is 119.2 degrees. By weight percent, the composition of scandium trihydride is 6.30% hydrogen and 93.70% scandium. In scandium trihydride, the formal oxidation states of hydrogen and scandium are −1 and +3 respectively, because of the electronegativity of scandium is lower than that of hydrogen. The stability of metal hydrides with the formula MH_{3} (M = Sc-Lu) increases as the atomic number of M increases.

Early theoretical studies of ScH_{3} revealed that the molecule is unstable, the bulk substance is likely to be a colourless gas with a low activation energy toward the conversion into trimeric clusters due to the electron deficient nature of the monomer, not unlike the group 13 hydrides. One major difference, is that the dimer is the most stable cluster for group 13 hydrides. This can be attributed to the distortion caused by the d-orbitals. It cannot be made by methods used to synthesise BH_{3} or AlH_{3}.
