= Mercury hydride =

Mercury hydride may refer to:

- Mercury(I) hydride (HgH or Hg_{2}H_{2}), an extremely unstable gas
- Mercury(II) hydride (HgH_{2}), a volatile but relatively stable white solid
