= Beryllium hydride =

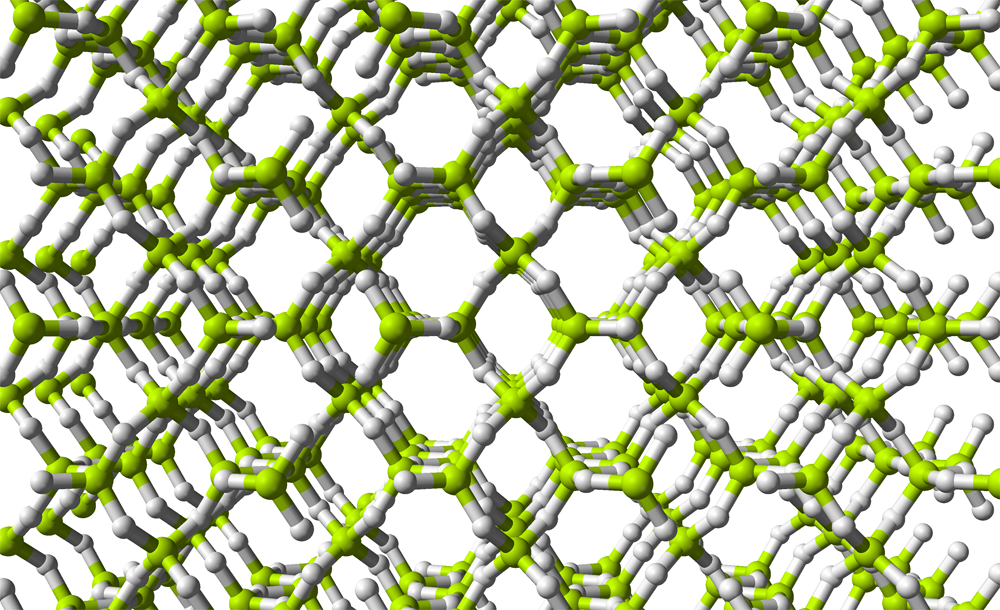

Names
- Other names Beryllium dihydride Beryllium hydride Beryllane

Identifiers
CAS Number	7787-52-2
3D model (JSmol)	Interactive image
ChEBI	CHEBI:33787
ChemSpider	17215712
PubChem CID	139073
UNII	5M7P3TK96I
CompTox Dashboard (EPA)	DTXSID001027443 DTXSID4023913, DTXSID001027443
- InChI: InChI=1S/Be.2H Key: RWASOQSEFLDYLC-UHFFFAOYSA-N; InChI=1/Be.2H/rBeH2/h1H2 Key: RWASOQSEFLDYLC-JICJMJRQAQ
- SMILES: [BeH2]

Properties
Chemical formula	BeH_{2}
Molar mass	11.03 g mol^{−1}
Appearance	white solid
Density	0.65 g/cm^{3}
Melting point	250 °C (482 °F; 523 K) decomposes
Solubility in water	decomposes
Solubility	insoluble in diethyl ether, toluene
- Structure
Crystal structure	orthorhombic
Space group	Ibam, no. 72
Lattice constant	a = 4.1600 Å, b = 9.0820 Å, c = 7.7070 Å α = 90°, β = 90°, γ = 90°
Lattice volume (V)	291.18 Å^{3}
Formula units (Z)	12

Thermochemistry
Heat capacity (C)	30.124 J/mol K

Hazards
- NIOSH (US health exposure limits)
PEL (Permissible)	TWA 0.002 mg/m^{3} C 0.005 mg/m^{3} (30 minutes), with a maximum peak of 0.025 mg/m^{3} (as Be)
REL (Recommended)	Ca C 0.0005 mg/m^{3} (as Be)
IDLH (Immediate danger)	Ca [4 mg/m^{3} (as Be)]

Related compounds
Other cations	lithium hydride, sodium hydride, magnesium hydride, calcium hydride, boron hydrides, aluminium hydride
Related compounds	beryllium fluoride
- Except where otherwise noted, data are given for materials in their standard state (at 25 °C [77 °F], 100 kPa). verify (what is ?) Infobox references

Beryllium hydride (systematically named poly[beryllane(2)] and beryllium dihydride) is an inorganic compound with the chemical formula (BeH_{2})_{n} (also written ([BeH_{2}])_{n} or BeH_{2}). This alkaline earth hydride is a colourless solid that is insoluble in solvents that do not decompose it. Unlike the ionically bonded hydrides of the heavier Group 2 elements, beryllium hydride is covalently bonded (three-center two-electron bond).

== Synthesis ==
Unlike the other group 2 metals, beryllium does not react with hydrogen. Instead, BeH_{2} is prepared from preformed beryllium(II) compounds. It was first synthesized in 1951 by treating dimethylberyllium, Be(CH_{3})_{2}, with lithium aluminium hydride, LiAlH_{4}.

Purer BeH_{2} forms from the pyrolysis of di-tert-butylberyllium, Be(C[CH_{3}]_{3})_{2} at 210°C.

A route to highly pure samples involves the reaction of triphenylphosphine, PPh_{3}, with beryllium borohydride, Be(BH_{4})_{2}:

Be(BH_{4})_{2} + 2 PPh_{3} → BeH_{2} + 2 Ph_{3}PBH_{3}

== Structure ==
=== Gaseous form ===
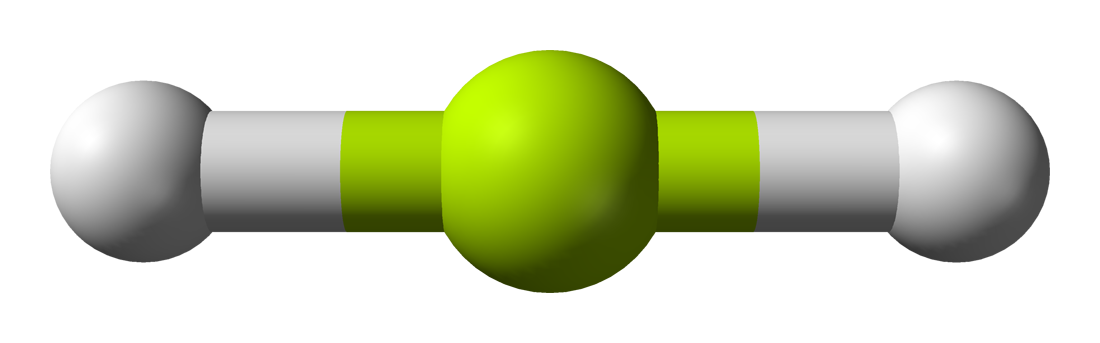
Structure of gaseous BeH_{2}.

Isolated molecules of BeH_{2} (sometimes called dihydridoberyllium and written [BeH_{2}] to emphasize the differences with the solid state) are only stable as a dilute gas. When condensed, unsolvated BeH_{2} will spontaneously autopolymerise.

Free molecular BeH_{2} produced by high-temperature electrical discharge has been confirmed to have linear geometry with a Be-H bond length of 133.376 pm. Its hybridization is sp.

=== Condensed beryllium hydride ===
Subunit of orthorhombic BeH_{2} structure. Each Be is tetrahedral and each H is doubly bridging.

BeH_{2} most often is formed as an amorphous white powder by decomposing various organo-beryllium compounds, which has been shown to consist of a network of corner sharing tetrahedra.

Early work showed that there are multiple phases of BeH_{2}, with the low temperature, higher-density phase shown to have a hexagonal crystalline form by selected-area electron diffraction (SAED), but this structure has not been solved to date. The other phase was argued to have either a monoclinic or tetragonal cell.

Further synchrotron Powder X-ray diffraction studies of the higher-density phase of BeH_{2} have shown crystalline beryllium hydride to have a body-centered orthorhombic unit cell (space group Ibam), containing a network of corner-sharing BeH_{4} tetrahedra, in contrast to the flat, hydrogen-bridged, infinite chains previously thought to exist in crystalline BeH_{2}. The Be-H bond length is significantly shorter in for the orthorhomibic crystal shown than would be assumed in the hydrogen-bridged infinite chain model, with greater bond angles found in the BeH2 crystal structure compared to the 90° angles expected in the hydrogen-bridged model. Before the structure was solved by synchrotron X-ray diffraction, it was thought that there was hydrogen-bridging.

== Chemical properties ==
=== Reaction with water and acids ===
Beryllium hydride reacts slowly with water but is rapidly hydrolysed by acid such as hydrogen chloride to form beryllium chloride.

BeH_{2} + 2 H_{2}O → Be(OH)_{2} + 2 H_{2}

BeH_{2} + 2 HCl → BeCl_{2} + 2 H_{2}

=== Reaction with Lewis bases ===
The two-coordinate hydridoberyllium group can accept an electron-pair donating ligand (L) into the molecule by adduction:

[BeH_{2}] + L → [BeH_{2}L]

Because these reactions are energetically favored, beryllium hydride has Lewis-acidic character.

The reaction with lithium hydride (in which the hydride ion is the Lewis base), forms sequentially LiBeH_{3} and Li_{2}BeH_{4}. The latter contains the tetrahydridoberyllate(2-) anion BeH^{2−}_{4}.

Beryllium hydride reacts with trimethylamine, N(CH_{3})_{3} to form a dimeric adduct with bridging hydrides. However, with dimethylamine, HN(CH_{3})_{2} it forms a trimeric beryllium diamide, [Be(N(CH_{3})_{2})_{2}]_{3}, and hydrogen.
