= Scandium hydride =

Alloy

Scandium hydride, also known as scandium–hydrogen alloy, is an alloy made by combining scandium and hydrogen. Hydrogen acts as a hardening agent, preventing dislocations in the scandium atom crystal lattice from sliding past one another. Varying the amount of hydrogen controls qualities such as the hardness of the resulting scandium hydride. Scandium hydride with increased hydrogen content can be made harder than scandium.

It can be formed by progressive hydrogenation of scandium foil with hydrogen.

In the narrow range of concentrations which make up scandium hydride, mixtures of hydrogen and scandium can form two different structures. At room temperature, the most stable form of scandium is the hexagonal close-packed (HCP) structure α-scandium. It is a fairly soft metallic material that can dissolve a moderate concentration of hydrogen, no more than 0.89 wt% at 22 °C. If scandium hydride contains more than 0.89% hydrogen at room temperature then it transforms into a face-centred cubic (FCC) structure, the δ-phase. It can dissolve considerably more hydrogen, as much as 4.29%, which reflects the upper hydrogen content of scandium hydride.

Research indicates the existence of a third phase created under extreme conditions termed the η-phase. This phase can dissolve as much as 6.30% hydrogen.

Concentration dependent activation-energies are observed for hydrogen diffusion in scandium metal.
