= Plumbane =

- Skeletal formula of plumbane

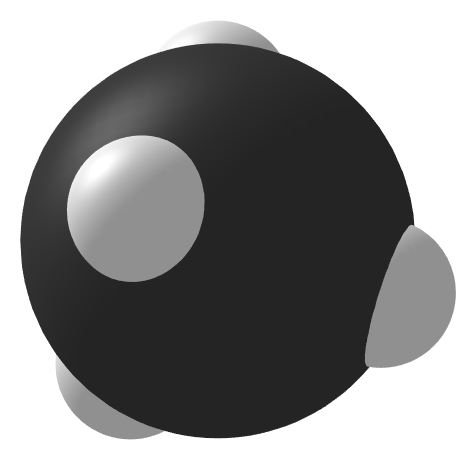
- Spacefill model of plumbane Lead, Pb Hydrogen, H

Names
- IUPAC name Plumbane
- Other names lead tetrahydride, tetrahydridolead, lead(IV) hydride, hydrogen plumbide

Identifiers
CAS Number	15875-18-0
3D model (JSmol)	Interactive image
ChEBI	CHEBI:30181
ChemSpider	109888
PubChem CID	123278
CompTox Dashboard (EPA)	DTXSID201319327
- InChI: InChI=1S/Pb.4H Key: XRCKXJLUPOKIPF-UHFFFAOYSA-N; InChI=1/Pb.4H/rH4Pb/h1H4 Key: XRCKXJLUPOKIPF-BJORFFIVAF
- SMILES: [Pb]

Properties
Chemical formula	PbH_{4}
Molar mass	211.23 g/mol
Appearance	Colorless gas
Boiling point	−13 °C (9 °F; 260 K)

Structure
Molecular shape	Tetrahedral at the Pb atom

Related compounds
Related tetrahydride compounds	Methane; Silane; Germane; Stannane
- Except where otherwise noted, data are given for materials in their standard state (at 25 °C [77 °F], 100 kPa). verify (what is ?) Infobox references

Plumbane is an inorganic chemical compound with the chemical formula PbH_{4}. Proposed to be a colorless gas at room temperature, it is a group 14 hydride composed of lead and hydrogen. Plumbane is not well characterized or, and it is predicted to be thermodynamically unstable, as is typical for heavy main group hydrides.

== Experimental work ==
If it exists, it is very labile. Because plumbane is so unstable, it cannot be made by classical methods used to synthesize GeH_{4} or SnH_{4}, i.e. salt-forming reactions. Evidence for its existence resulted from electrolysis of lead alloys using a Marsh test-like setup. Plumbane was proposed to be generated by laser ablation and additionally identified the infrared (IR) bands. The ion PbH^{+}_{4} has been detected by mass spectrometry.

== Computation ==
Plumbane has been the subject of repeated quantum chemical studies. It is predicted to have tetrahedral (T_{d}) structure with a Pb-H distance of 1.73 Å.

== Congeners ==
Congeners of plumbane include:

- Methane, CH_{4}
- Silane, SiH_{4}
- Germane, GeH_{4}
- Stannane, SnH_{4}

== Other lead hydrides ==
(C6H3-2,6-(mesityl)2)PbH dimer

A few lead hydrides has been isolated and characterized by X-ray crystallography.
