= Erbium dihydride =

Names
- Other names Erbium hydride

Identifiers
3D model (JSmol)	Interactive image
- InChI: InChI=1S/Er.2H/q+2;2*-1 Key: FAEVIASBETYVHZ-UHFFFAOYSA-N
- SMILES: [Er+2].[H-].[H-]

Properties
Chemical formula	ErH_{2}
Molar mass	169.28 g/mol
Appearance	Metallic solid

Structure
Crystal structure	Cubic, fluorite type
Space group	Fm3̅m, No. 225
Lattice constant	a = 0.5128 nm
Formula units (Z)	4
- Except where otherwise noted, data are given for materials in their standard state (at 25 °C [77 °F], 100 kPa). Infobox references

Erbium dihydride is an inorganic compound of erbium and hydrogen with the approximate composition ErH_{2}. It is the hydrogen-rich β phase of the erbium–hydrogen system and crystallizes in the cubic fluorite structure, with erbium atoms forming a face-centred cubic lattice and hydrogen occupying tetrahedral interstitial sites.

== Preparation ==
Erbium dihydride can be prepared by direct hydrogenation of metallic erbium:

Er + H_{2} → ErH_{2}

Hydrogen absorption by erbium proceeds through the Er–H phase diagram. At low hydrogen contents, hydrogen forms a solid solution in hexagonal erbium (the α phase), while compositions near ErH_{2} form the cubic β phase.

Further hydrogen uptake produces hydrogen-richer material approaching ErH_{3}, corresponding to the γ phase.

== Properties ==
=== Crystal structure ===
ErH_{2} crystallizes in the cubic crystal system, space group Fm3̅m (No. 225), with the fluorite or CaF_{2} structure type.

In this structure, the erbium atoms form a face-centred cubic lattice, while hydrogen occupies all eight tetrahedral sites of the conventional unit cell.

A room-temperature lattice parameter of approximately 5.128 Å has been reported.

X-ray diffraction measurements on mixed hydrogen/deuterium samples ErH_{2−x}D_{x} show that the cubic lattice parameter decreases approximately linearly with increasing deuterium content.

=== Electronic properties ===
Erbium dihydride is metallic. Band-structure calculations show that its Fermi level lies near the bottom of the erbium 5d band, in a region of relatively low electronic density of states.

Below the erbium-derived d states lie two overlapping metal–hydrogen bonding bands. This electronic structure differs substantially from that of elemental erbium and affects the Fermi-surface geometry, magnetic behaviour and electrical resistivity.

=== High-pressure behaviour ===
First-principles calculations indicate that the cubic fluorite structure remains mechanically stable to high pressure. A structural instability has been predicted near 20 GPa.

The same calculations give a zero-pressure lattice constant of about 5.232 Å, close to experimental values, and predict the expected decrease in volume and increase in bulk modulus with pressure.

=== Hydrogen stoichiometry ===
The β phase has a finite homogeneity range around ErH_{2} rather than existing only at an exact 2:1 hydrogen-to-erbium ratio.

For stoichiometric ErH_{2}, the tetrahedral interstitial sites are occupied by hydrogen. In hydrogen-rich compositions above ErH_{2}, additional hydrogen begins to occupy octahedral interstitial sites.

On heating hydrogen-rich erbium hydrides, the sequence of phase changes can pass from β + γ to β, then α + β, and finally the α solid solution as hydrogen is released.
