= Germane =

- Structural formula of germane

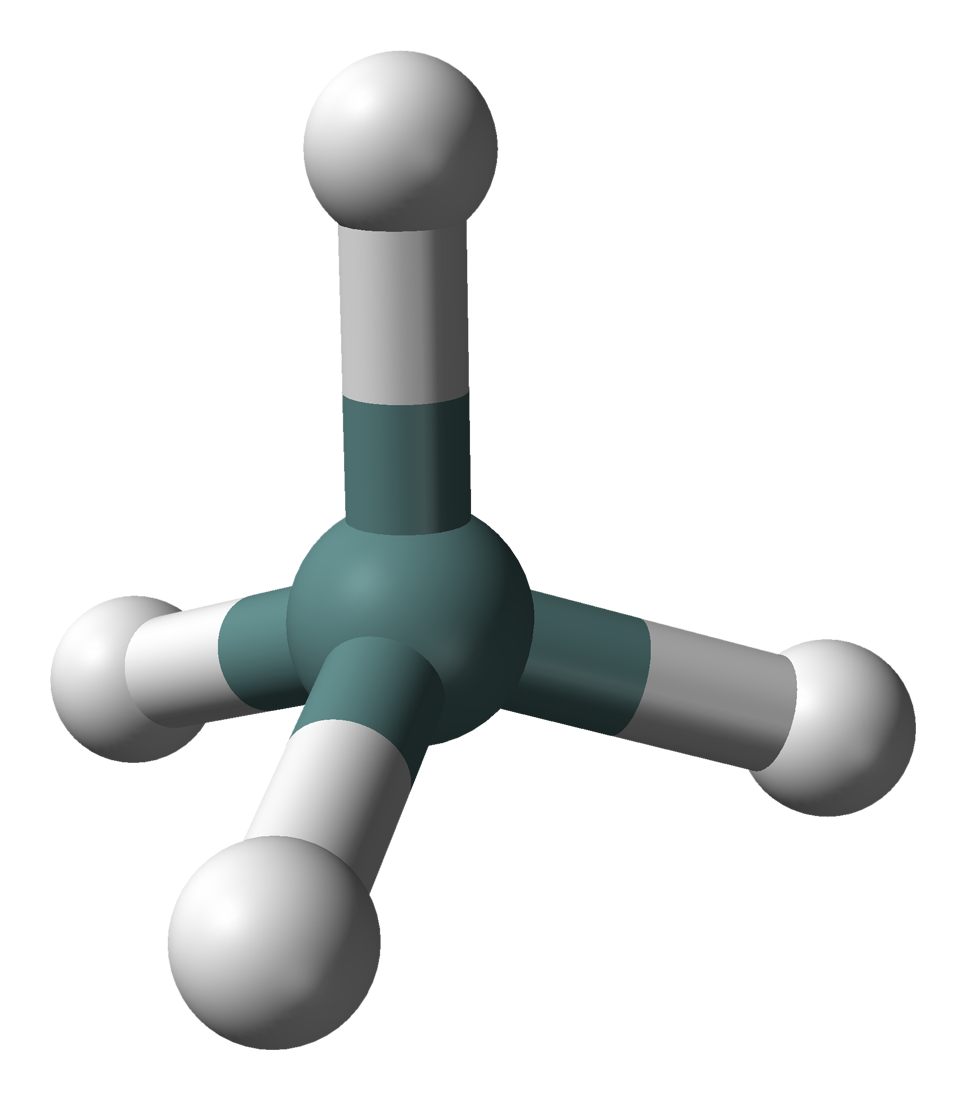
Ball-and-stick model of the germane molecule
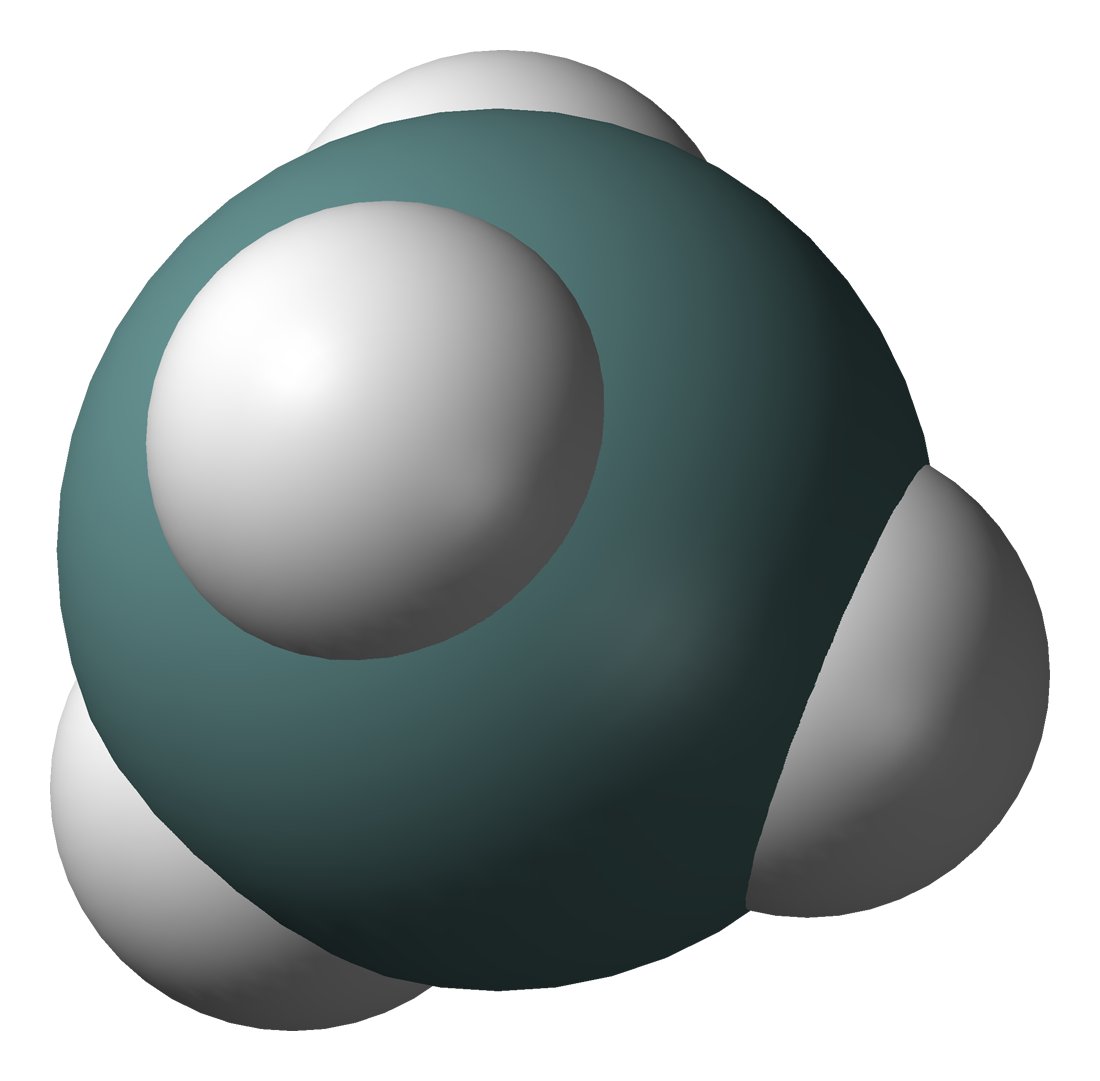
Space-filling model of the germane molecule
Germanium, Ge
Hydrogen, H

Names
- IUPAC name Germane
- Other names Germanium tetrahydride Germanomethane; Monogermane; Germanium(IV) hydride

Identifiers
| CAS Number | 7782-65-2 |
| 3D model (JSmol) | Interactive image |
| ChEBI | CHEBI:30443 |
| ChemSpider | 22420 |
| ECHA InfoCard | 100.029.055 |
| EC Number | 231-961-6 |
| Gmelin Reference | 587 |
| KEGG | C15472 |
| PubChem CID | 23984 |
| RTECS number | LY4900000 |
| UNII | 619P6J82AE |
| UN number | 2192 |
| CompTox Dashboard (EPA) | DTXSID7052521 |
- InChI: InChI=1S/GeH4/h1H4 Key: QUZPNFFHZPRKJD-UHFFFAOYSA-N; InChI=1/GeH4/h1H4 Key: QUZPNFFHZPRKJD-UHFFFAOYAE
- SMILES: [H][Ge]([H])([H])[H]

Properties
| Chemical formula | GeH_{4} |
| Molar mass | 76.62 g/mol |
| Appearance | Colorless gas |
| Odor | Pungent |
| Density | 3.3 kg/m^{3} |
| Melting point | −165 °C (−265 °F; 108 K) |
| Boiling point | −88 °C (−126 °F; 185 K) |
| Solubility in water | Low |
| Vapor pressure | >1 atm |
| Viscosity | 17.21 μPa·s (theoretical estimate) |

Structure
| Molecular shape | Tetrahedral |
| Dipole moment | 0 D |

Hazards
- Occupational safety and health (OHS/OSH)
| Main hazards | Toxic, flammable, may ignite spontaneously in air |
- GHS labelling
| Pictograms | (GHS02: Flammable) (GHS06: Toxic) (GHS07: Exclamation mark) |
| Signal word | Danger |
| Hazard statements | H220, H302, H330 |
| Precautionary statements | P210, P260, P264, P270, P271, P284, P301+P312, P304+P340, P310, P320, P330, P377, P381, P403, P403+P233, P405, P410+P403, P501 |
| NFPA 704 (fire diamond) | 4 4 3 |
- NIOSH (US health exposure limits)
| PEL (Permissible) | None |
| REL (Recommended) | TWA 0.2 ppm (0.6 mg/m^{3}) |
| IDLH (Immediate danger) | N.D. |
| Safety data sheet (SDS) | ICSC 1244 |

Related compounds
| Related compounds | Methane; Silane; Stannane; Plumbane; Germyl |
- Except where otherwise noted, data are given for materials in their standard state (at 25 °C [77 °F], 100 kPa). verify (what is ?) Infobox references

Germane is the chemical compound with the formula GeH_{4}, and the germanium analogue of methane. It is the simplest germanium hydride and one of the most useful compounds of germanium. Like the related compounds silane and methane, germane is tetrahedral. It burns in air to produce GeO_{2} and water. Germane is a group 14 hydride.

== Occurrence ==
Germane has been detected in the atmosphere of Jupiter.

== Synthesis ==
Germane is typically prepared by reduction of germanium oxides, notably germanates, with hydride reagents such as sodium borohydride, potassium borohydride, lithium borohydride, lithium aluminium hydride, sodium aluminium hydride. The reaction with borohydrides is catalyzed by various acids and can be carried out in either aqueous or organic solvent. On laboratory scale, germane can be prepared by the reaction of Ge(IV) compounds with these hydride reagents. A typical synthesis involved the reaction of potassium hydrogen germanate with potassium borohydride.

K^{+}HGeO^{−}_{3} + K^{+}[BH_{4}]^{−} + H_{2}O → KGeH_{3} + K^{+}[B(OH)_{4}]^{−}
KGeH_{3} + CH_{3}COOH → GeH_{4} + CH_{3}COO^{−}K^{+}

Other methods for the synthesis of germane include electrochemical reduction and a plasma-based method. The electrochemical reduction method involves applying voltage to a germanium metal cathode immersed in an aqueous electrolyte solution and an anode counter-electrode composed of a metal such as molybdenum or cadmium. In this method, germane and hydrogen gases evolve from the cathode while the anode reacts to form solid molybdenum oxide or cadmium oxides. The plasma synthesis method involves bombarding germanium metal with hydrogen atoms (H) that are generated using a high frequency plasma source to produce germane and digermane.

== Reactions ==
Germane is weakly acidic. In liquid ammonia GeH_{4} is ionised forming NH_{4}^{+} and GeH_{3}^{−}. With alkali metals in liquid ammonia GeH_{4} reacts to give white crystalline MGeH_{3} compounds. The potassium (potassium germyl or potassium trihydrogen germanide KGeH_{3}) and rubidium compounds (rubidium germyl or rubidium trihydrogen germanide RbGeH_{3}) have the sodium chloride structure implying a free rotation of the trihydrogen germanide anion GeH_{3}^{−}, the caesium compound, caesium germyl or caesium trihydrogen germanide CsGeH_{3} in contrast has the distorted sodium chloride structure of TlI.

== Use in semiconductor industry ==
The gas decomposes near 600K (327°C; 620°F) to germanium and hydrogen. Because of its thermal lability, germane is used in the semiconductor industry for the epitaxial growth of germanium by MOVPE or chemical beam epitaxy. Organogermanium precursors (e.g. isobutylgermane, alkylgermanium trichlorides, and dimethylaminogermanium trichloride) have been examined as less hazardous liquid alternatives to germane for deposition of Ge-containing films by MOVPE.

== Safety ==
Germane is a highly flammable, potentially pyrophoric, and a highly toxic gas. In 1970, the American Conference of Governmental Industrial Hygienists (ACGIH) published the latest changes and set the occupational exposure threshold limit value at 0.2 ppm for an 8-hour time weighted average. The LC50 for rats at 1 hour of exposure is 622 ppm. Inhalation or exposure may result in malaise, headache, dizziness, fainting, dyspnea, nausea, vomiting, kidney injury, and hemolytic effects.

The US Department of Transportation hazard class is 2.3 Poisonous Gas.
