= Barium hydride =

Identifiers
CAS Number	13477-09-3
ChEBI	CHEBI:32592
ChemSpider	26408
ECHA InfoCard	100.033.407
PubChem CID	5483624
CompTox Dashboard (EPA)	DTXSID001014393
- InChI: InChI=1S/Ba.2H/q+2;2*-1 Key: RQPZNWPYLFFXCP-UHFFFAOYSA-L; InChI=1S/Ba.2H/q+2;2*-1 Key: BPYQMQIZFKTCMA-UHFFFAOYSA-N

Properties
Chemical formula	BaH_{2}
Molar mass	139.343 g/mol
Appearance	white to gray crystals
Density	4.16 g/cm^{3}
Melting point	675 °C (1,247 °F; 948 K) decomposes
Solubility in water	Reaction
- Except where otherwise noted, data are given for materials in their standard state (at 25 °C [77 °F], 100 kPa). Infobox references

Barium hydride is a chemical compound with the chemical formula BaH_{2}.

== Preparation and structure ==
Barium hydride can be prepared by reacting elemental barium with hydrogen at relatively high temperatures between 150-200 °C:

Ba + H_{2} → BaH_{2}

== Reactions ==
Barium hydride reacts with oxygen and water. It is easily explosive when it is mixed with a solid oxidant such as a halide or chromate.
