= Stannane =

- Structure and dimensions of the stannane molecule

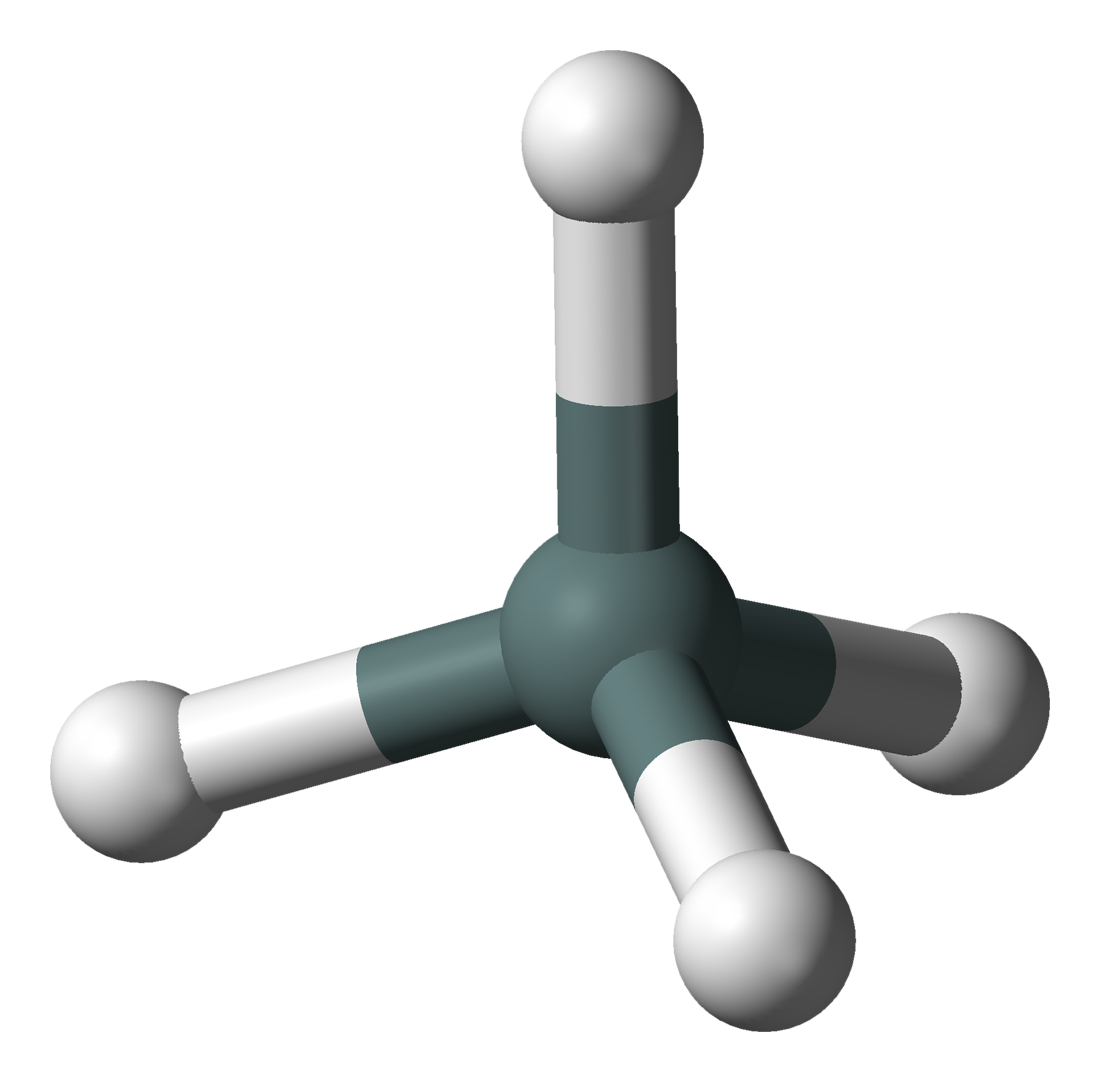
Ball-and-stick model of the stannane molecule
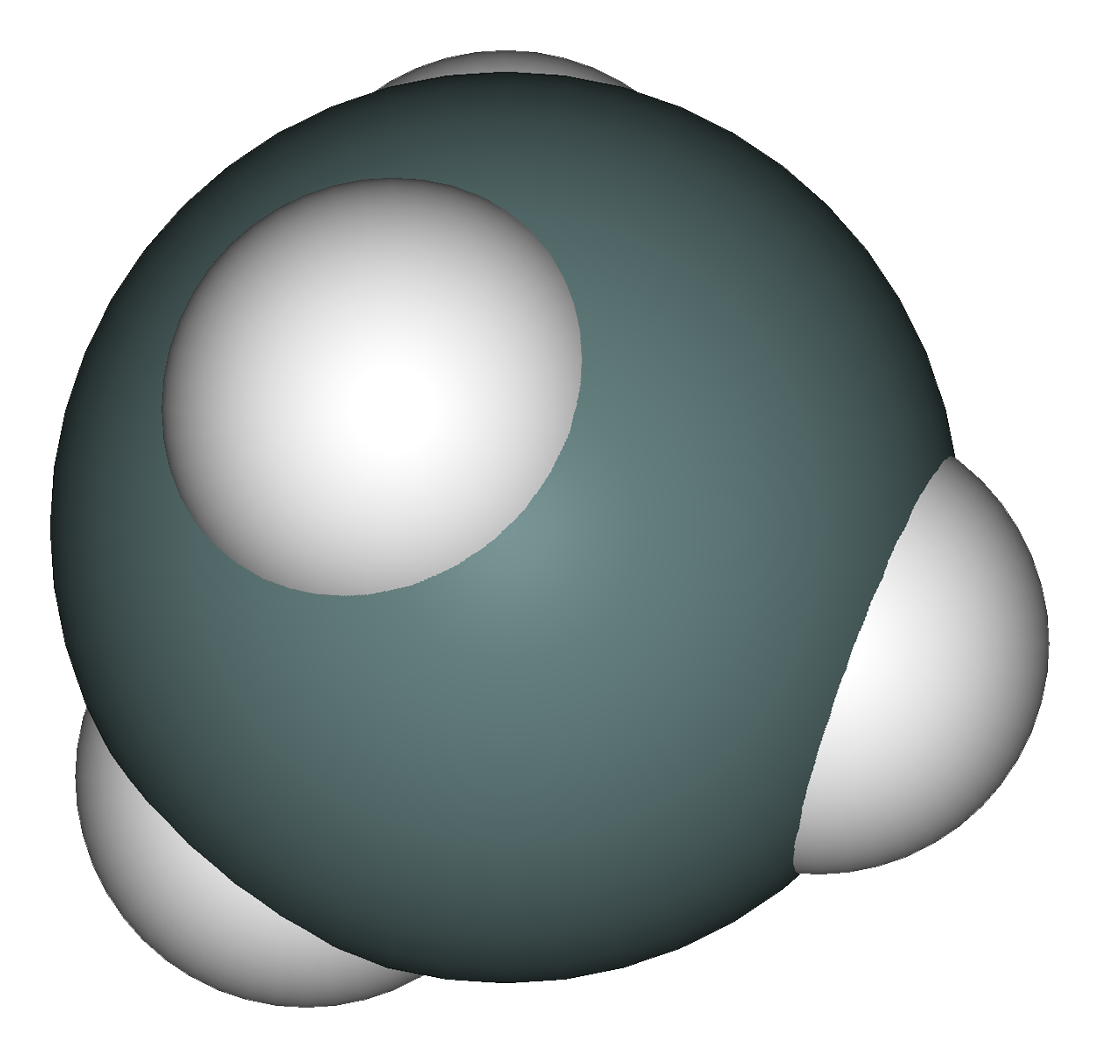
Space-filling model of the stannane molecule
Tin, Sn
Hydrogen, H

Names
- IUPAC name Stannane
- Other names tin tetrahydride tin hydride tin(IV) hydride

Identifiers
CAS Number	2406-52-2
3D model (JSmol)	Interactive image
ChEBI	CHEBI:30419
ChemSpider	109776
PubChem CID	123161
CompTox Dashboard (EPA)	DTXSID50894052
- InChI: InChI=1S/Sn.4H Key: KXCAEQNNTZANTK-UHFFFAOYSA-N; InChI=1/Sn.4H/rH4Sn/h1H4 Key: KXCAEQNNTZANTK-GVMKXMNPAM
- SMILES: [Sn]

Properties
Chemical formula	SnH_{4}
Molar mass	122.71 g/mol
Appearance	colourless gas
Density	5.4 g/L, gas
Melting point	−146 °C (−231 °F; 127 K)
Boiling point	−52 °C (−62 °F; 221 K)

Structure
Molecular shape	Tetrahedral
Dipole moment	0 D

Thermochemistry
Heat capacity (C)	1.262 kJ/(kg·K)
Std enthalpy of formation (Δ_{f}H^{⦵}_{298})	162.8 kJ/mol
Enthalpy of vaporization (Δ_{f}H_{vap})	19.049 kJ/mol

Related compounds
Related organotins	tributylstannane (Bu_{3}SnH)
Related compounds	Methane; Silane; Germane; Plumbane
- Except where otherwise noted, data are given for materials in their standard state (at 25 °C [77 °F], 100 kPa). verify (what is ?) Infobox references

Stannane /ˈstæneɪn/ or tin hydride is an inorganic compound with the chemical formula SnH_{4}. It is a colourless gas that ignites on contact with air. SnH_{4} is a heavy analogue of methane but much less robust. In contrast to this rarely used species, stannane also refers to a large collection of organotin compounds.

== Preparation and reactions ==
Stannane can be prepared by the reaction of SnCl_{4} and lithium aluminium hydride according to the following idealized equation:

SnCl_{4} + Li[AlH_{4}] → SnH_{4} + LiCl + AlCl_{3}

Stannane decomposes slowly at room temperature to give metallic tin and hydrogen.

SnH_{4} → Sn + 2H_{2}

Organotin hydrides are more stable, e.g. triphenyltin hydride, also known as triphenylstannane.

== Occurrence in industry ==
Stannane is produced in EUV machines in the semiconductor industry from the reaction of molten tin with hydrogen gas during the laser-induced generation of specific wavelengths of light required for photolithography. The volatility of the stannane gas is a controlled parameter in the production of microchips.

== See also ==
- Organotin
