= Cadmium hydride =

Names
- Other names Cadmium(II) hydride Cadmium dihydride

Identifiers
CAS Number	72172-64-6
3D model (JSmol)	Interactive image
ChemSpider	29331616
- InChI: InChI=1S/Cd.2H/q+2;2*-1 Key: IVRSYBKJJXDUEX-UHFFFAOYSA-N; InChI=1/Cd.2H/q+2;2*-1 Key: IVRSYBKJJXDUEX-UHFFFAOYAR
- SMILES: [H-].[H-].[Cd+2]

Properties
Chemical formula	CdH_{2}
Molar mass	113.419 g mol^{−1}

Hazards
- NIOSH (US health exposure limits)
PEL (Permissible)	[1910.1027] TWA 0.005 mg/m^{3} (as Cd)
REL (Recommended)	Ca
IDLH (Immediate danger)	Ca [9 mg/m^{3} (as Cd)]

Related compounds
Related compounds	Mercury(II) hydride
- Except where otherwise noted, data are given for materials in their standard state (at 25 °C [77 °F], 100 kPa). verify (what is ?) Infobox references

Cadmium hydride (systematically named cadmium dihydride) is an inorganic compound with the chemical formula (CdH_{2})_{n} (also written as ([CdH_{2}])_{n} or CdH_{2}). It is a solid, known only as a thermally unstable, insoluble white powder.

== Nomenclature ==
The systematic name cadmium dihydride, a valid IUPAC name, is constructed according to the compositional nomenclature. Cadmium dihydride is also used to refer to the related molecular compound dihydridocadmium and its oligomers. Care should be taken to avoid confusing the two compounds.

Cadmium hydride is also used as a compositional IUPAC name for the compound with the chemical formula CdH.

== History ==
In 1950 a research group led by Glenn D. Barbaras, synthesized cadmium hydride for the first time. This reaction sequence consisted of demethylation of dimethylcadmium in diethyl ether at −78 °C, to cadmium hydride.

== Chemical properties ==
Solid cadmium hydride, on the basis of its infrared spectrum, is believed to contain hydrogen-bridge bonds. Other lower metal hydrides polymerize in a similar fashion. Unless cooled below −20 °C (−4 °F), cadmium hydride rapidly decomposes to produce cadmium and hydrogen:

(CdH_{2})_{n} → n Cd + n H_{2}

== Dihydridocadmium ==
Dihydridocadmium is the monomeric, molecular form with the chemical formula CdH_{2} (also written [CdH_{2}]). It is a colorless gas that does not persist undiluted. Dihydridocadmium has a low activation barrier toward autopolymerisation into the standard form of cadmium hydride and would rapidly do so in undiluted concentrations. Since the activation barrier for the reverse reaction is much greater than that of the decomposition reaction, autopolymerisation of dihydridocadmium may be considered as irreversible for most intents and purposes. It was produced by the gas phase reaction of excited cadmium atoms with dihydrogen, H_{2}, and the structure determined high-resolution infrared emission spectra. The molecule is linear, with a bond length of 168.3 pm.

=== Chemical properties ===
The two-coordinate hydridocadmiumgroup (-CdH) in hydridocadmiums such as dihydridocadmium can accept an electron-pair donating ligand into the molecule by adduction:

[CdH_{2}] + L → [CdH_{2}L]

Because of this acceptance of the electron-pair donating ligand (L), dihydridocadmium has Lewis-acidic character. Dihydridocadmium can accept two electron-pairs from ligands, as in the case of the tetrahydridocadmate(2−) anion (CdH^{2−}_{4}).

The compound, Cs_{3}CdH_{5}, prepared by the reaction of caesium hydride, CsH, and cadmium metal powder at high temperature contains the CdH^{2−}_{4} ion, along with caesium cations, Cs^{+}, and hydride anions, H^{−}. The tetrahedral anion is an example of an ionic complex of CdH_{2}. The average Cd-H bond length in CdH^{2−}_{4} is 182pm.

In gaseous dihydridocadmium, the molecules form groups (trimers), being connected by van der Waals forces. The dissociation enthalpy of the dimer is estimated at 8.8 kJ mol^{−1}.
