= Calcium hydride =

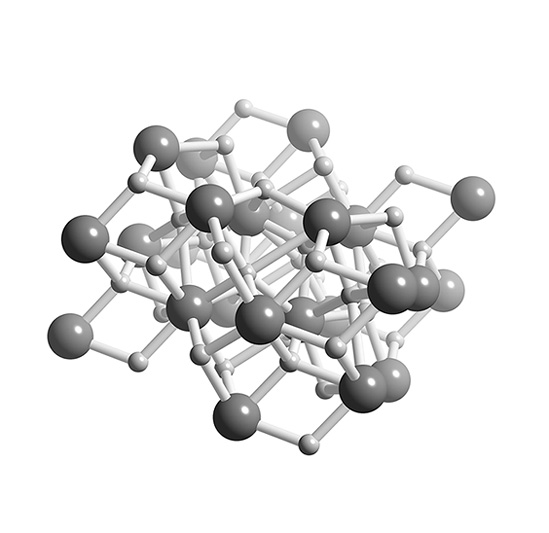
- Calcium hydride

Names
- IUPAC name Calcium hydride
- Other names Calcium(II) hydride Calcium dihydride Hydrolith

Identifiers
CAS Number	7789-78-8
3D model (JSmol)	Interactive image
ChemSpider	94784
ECHA InfoCard	100.029.263
EC Number	232-189-2
PubChem CID	105052
UNII	WY779SQ0XW
CompTox Dashboard (EPA)	DTXSID60894886
- InChI: InChI=1S/Ca.2H/q+2;2*-1 Key: UUGAXJGDKREHIO-UHFFFAOYSA-N; InChI=1/Ca.2H/q+2;2*-1 Key: UUGAXJGDKREHIO-UHFFFAOYAG
- SMILES: [H-].[H-].[Ca+2]

Properties
Chemical formula	CaH_{2}
Molar mass	42.094 g/mol
Appearance	gray powder (white when pure)
Density	1.70 g/cm^{3}, solid
Melting point	816 °C (1,501 °F; 1,089 K)
Solubility in water	reacts violently
Solubility	reacts in alcohol

Structure
Crystal structure	Orthorhombic, oP12
Space group	Pnma, No. 62

Thermochemistry
Std molar entropy (S^{⦵}_{298})	41.4 J/(mol·K)
Std enthalpy of formation (Δ_{f}H^{⦵}_{298})	−181.5 kJ/mol
Gibbs free energy (Δ_{f}G^{⦵})	−142.5 kJ/mol

Hazards
- GHS labelling
Pictograms	(GHS07: Exclamation mark) (GHS05: Corrosive) (GHS09: Environmental hazard)
Signal word	Danger
Hazard statements	H260
NFPA 704 (fire diamond)	3 3 2 W

Related compounds
Other cations	Sodium hydride; Potassium hydride; Magnesium hydride
- Except where otherwise noted, data are given for materials in their standard state (at 25 °C [77 °F], 100 kPa). verify (what is ?) Infobox references

Calcium hydride is the chemical compound with the formula CaH_{2}, an alkaline earth hydride. This grey powder (white if pure, which is rare) reacts vigorously with water, liberating hydrogen gas. CaH_{2} is thus used as a drying agent, i.e. a desiccant.

CaH_{2} is a saline hydride, meaning that its structure is salt-like. The alkali metals and the alkaline earth metals heavier than beryllium all form saline hydrides. A well-known example is sodium hydride, which crystallizes in the NaCl motif. These species are insoluble in all solvents with which they do not react. CaH_{2} crystallizes in the PbCl_{2} (cotunnite) structure.

== Preparation ==
Calcium hydride is prepared from its elements by direct combination of calcium and hydrogen at 300 to 400 °C.

== Uses ==
=== Reduction of metal oxides ===
CaH_{2} is a reducing agent for the production of metal from the metal oxides of Ti, V, Nb, Ta, and U. It is proposed to operate via its decomposition to Ca metal:

TiO_{2} + 2 CaH_{2} → Ti + 2 CaO + 2 H_{2}

=== Hydrogen source ===
CaH_{2} has been used for hydrogen production. In the 1940s, it was available under the trade name "Hydrolith" as a source of hydrogen:

The trade name for this compound is "hydrolith"; in cases of emergency, it can be used as a portable source of hydrogen, for filling airships. It is rather expensive for this use.

The reference to "emergency" probably refers to wartime use. The compound has, however, been widely used for decades as a safe and convenient means to inflate weather balloons. Likewise, it is regularly used in laboratories to produce small quantities of highly pure hydrogen for experiments. The moisture content of diesel fuel is estimated by the hydrogen evolved upon treatment with CaH_{2}.

=== Desiccant ===
The reaction of CaH_{2} with water can be represented as follows:

CaH_{2} + 2 H_{2}O → Ca(OH)_{2} + 2 H_{2}

The two hydrolysis products, gaseous H_{2} and Ca(OH)_{2}, are readily separated from the dried solvent.

Calcium hydride is a relatively mild desiccant and, compared to molecular sieves, probably inefficient. Its use is safer than more reactive agents such as sodium metal or sodium-potassium alloy. Calcium hydride is widely used as a desiccant for basic solvents such as amines and pyridine. It is also used to dry alcohols.

Despite its convenience, CaH_{2} has a few drawbacks:

- It is insoluble in all solvents with which it does not react vigorously, in contrast to LiAlH_{4}, thus the speed of its drying action can be slow.
- Because CaH_{2} and Ca(OH)_{2} are almost indistinguishable in appearance, the quality of a sample of CaH_{2} is not obvious visually.

=== History ===
During the Battle of the Atlantic, German submarines used calcium hydride as a sonar decoy called bold.

== Other calcium hydrides ==
Although the term calcium hydride almost always refers to CaH_{2}, a number of molecular hydrides of calcium are known. One example is (Ca(μ-H)(thf)(nacnac))_{2}. Dimeric calcium hydrides arise through the reaction of a calcium amide with phenylsilane. Subsequent studies have expanded the library of stabilizing ligands, but all are multidentate ligands that coordinate through nitrogen sites.

== See also ==
- Calcium monohydride
