= Iron(I) hydride =

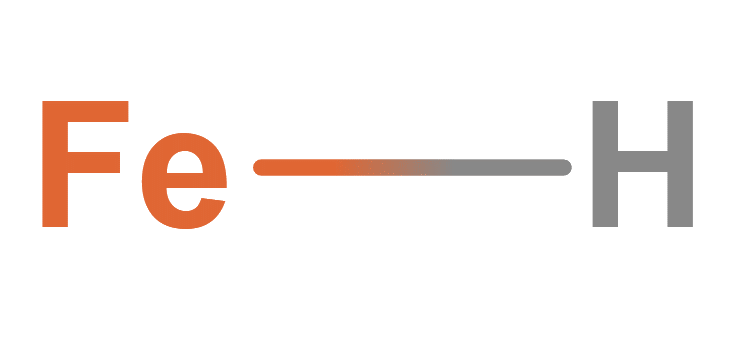

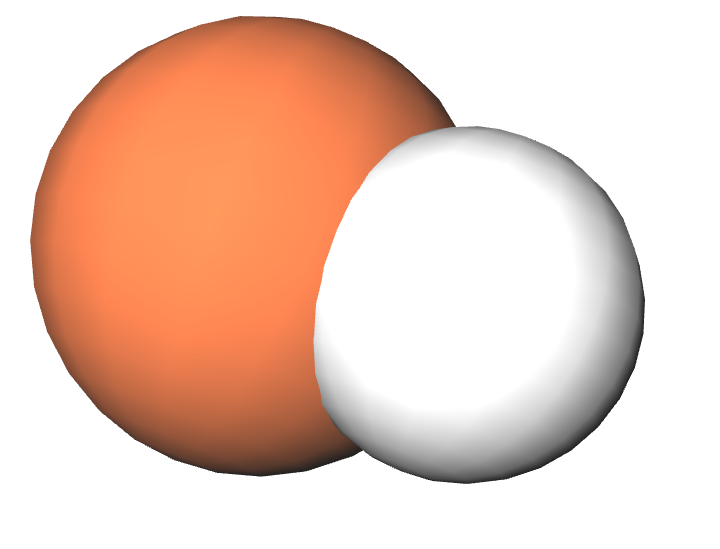

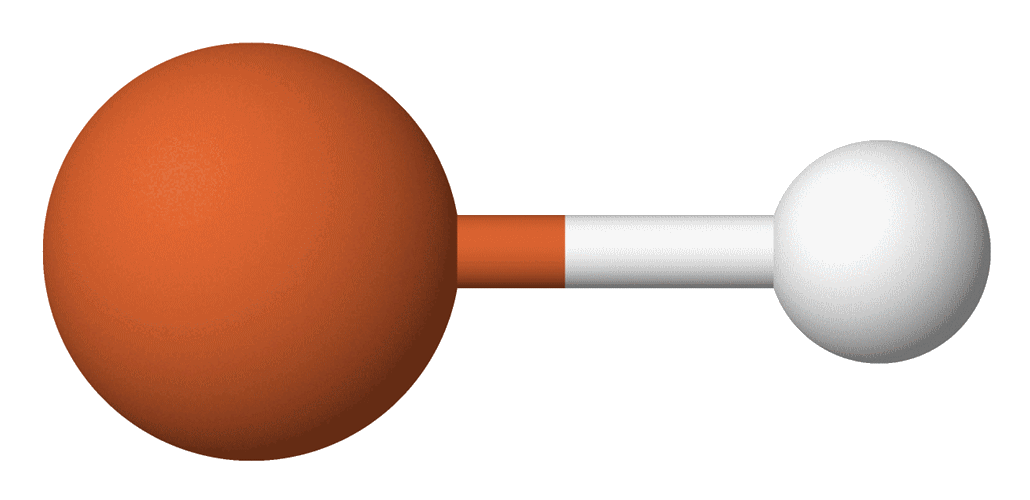

Names
- Systematic IUPAC name Hydridoiron(3•)

Identifiers
CAS Number	15600-68-7
3D model (JSmol)	Interactive image
CompTox Dashboard (EPA)	DTXSID001045306
- InChI: InChI=1S/Fe.H Key: VWDRTGQNZKYVEZ-UHFFFAOYSA-N
- SMILES: [Fe][H]

Properties
Chemical formula	FeH^{3•}
Molar mass	56.853 g/mol

Thermochemistry
Std enthalpy of formation (Δ_{f}H^{⦵}_{298})	450.6 kJ/mol

Related compounds
Related compounds	Iron hydrides, FeH_{2} CrH, CaH, MgH
- Except where otherwise noted, data are given for materials in their standard state (at 25 °C [77 °F], 100 kPa). Infobox references

Iron(I) hydride, systematically named iron hydride and poly(hydridoiron) is a solid inorganic compound with the chemical formula (FeH)_{n} (also written ([FeH])_{n} or FeH). It is both thermodynamically and kinetically unstable toward decomposition at ambient temperature, and as such, little is known about its bulk properties.

Iron(I) hydride is the simplest polymeric iron hydride. Due to its instability, it has no practical industrial uses. However, in metallurgical chemistry, iron(I) hydride is fundamental to certain forms of iron-hydrogen alloys.

== Nomenclature ==
The systematic name iron hydride, a valid IUPAC name, is constructed according to the compositional nomenclature. However, as the name is compositional in nature, it does not distinguish between compounds of the same stoichiometry, such as molecular species, which exhibit distinct chemical properties. The systematic names poly(hydridoiron) and poly[ferrane(1)], also valid IUPAC names, are constructed according to the additive and electron-deficient substitutive nomenclatures, respectively. They do distinguish the titular compound from the others.

== Hydridoiron ==
Hydridoiron, also systematically named ferrane(1), is a related compound with the chemical formula FeH (also written [FeH]). It is also unstable at ambient temperature with the additional propensity to autopolymerize, and so cannot be concentrated.

Hydridoiron is the simplest molecular iron hydride. In addition, it may be considered to be the iron(I) hydride monomer. It has been detected in isolation only in extreme environments, like trapped in frozen noble gases, in the atmosphere of cool stars, or as a gas at temperatures above the boiling point of iron. It is assumed to have three dangling valence bonds, and is therefore a free radical; its formula may be written FeH^{3•} to emphasize this fact.

At very low temperatures (below 10 K), FeH may form a complex with molecular hydrogen FeH·H_{2}.

Hydridoiron was first detected in the laboratory by B. Kleman and L. Åkerlind in the 1950s.

== Properties ==
=== Radicality and acidity ===
A single electron of another atomic or molecular species can join with the iron centre in hydridoiron by substitution:

[FeH] + RR → [FeHR] + ·R

Because of this capture of a single electron, hydridoiron has radical character. Hydridoiron is a strong radical.

An electron pair of a Lewis base can join with the iron centre by adduction:

[FeH] + :L → [FeHL]

Because of this capture of an adducted electron pair, hydridoiron has Lewis-acidic character. It should be expected that iron(I) hydride has significantly diminished radical properties, but has similar acid properties, however reaction rates and equilibrium constants are different.

=== Structure ===
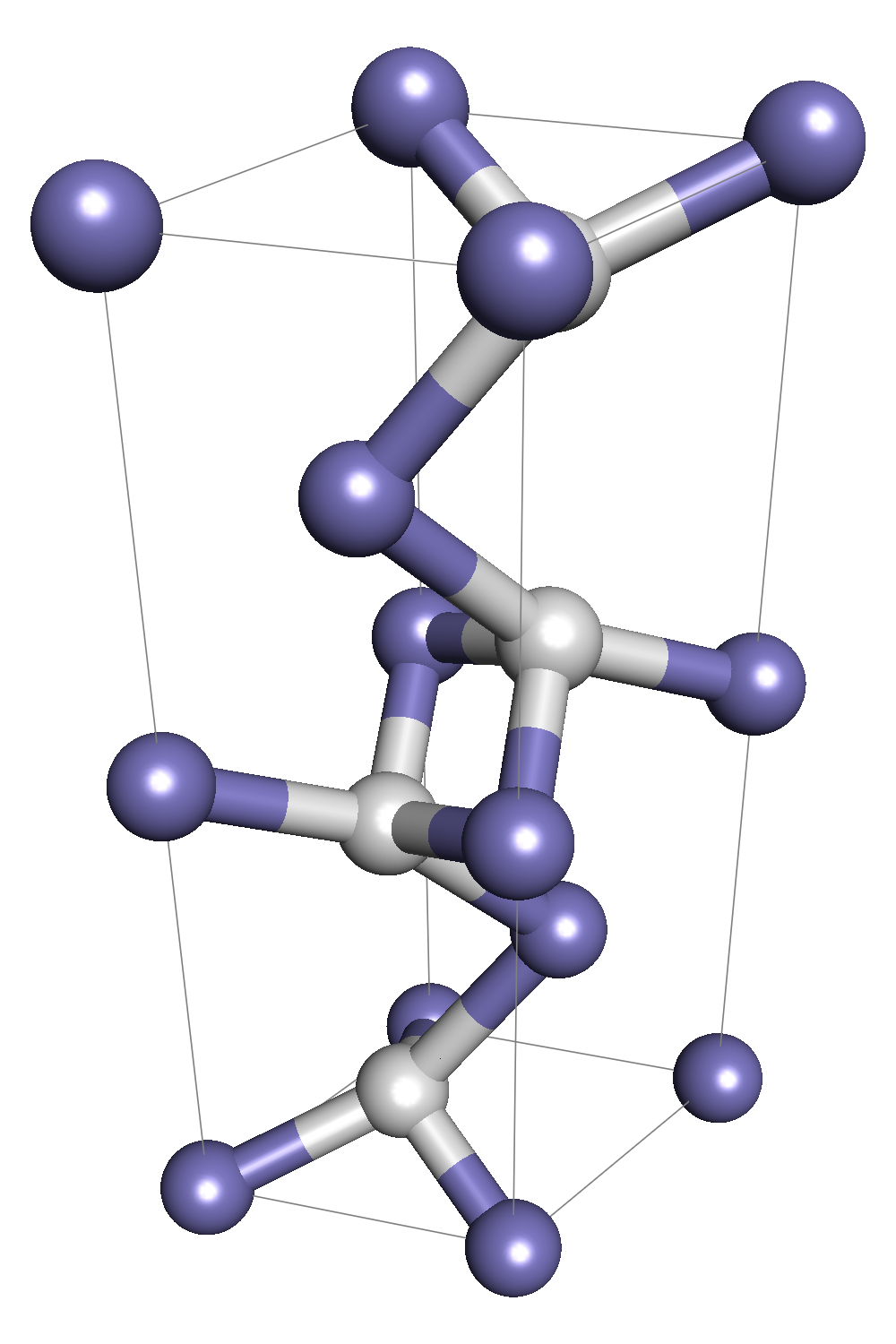
Ball and stick model of iron hydride

In iron(I) hydride, the atoms form a network, individual atoms being interconnected by covalent bonds. Since it is a polymeric solid, a monocrystalline sample is not expected to undergo state transitions, such as melting and dissolution, as this would require the rearrangement of molecular bonds and consequently, change its chemical identity. Colloidal crystalline samples, wherein intermolecular forces are relevant, are expected to undergo state transitions.

Iron(I) hydride adopts a double hexagonal close-packed crystalline structure with the P6_{3}/mmc space group, also referred to as epsilon-prime iron hydride in the context of the iron-hydrogen system. It is predicted to exhibit polymorphism, transitioning at some temperature below −173 °C (−279 °F) to a face-centred crystalline structure with the Fm3̅m space group.

=== Electromagnetic properties ===
FeH is predicted to have a quartet and a sextet ground states.

The FeH molecule has at least four low energy electronic states caused by the non bonding electron taking up positions in different orbitals: X^{4}Δ, a^{6}Δ b^{6}Π, and c^{6}Σ^{+}. Higher energy states are termed B^{4}Σ^{−}, C^{4}Φ, D^{4}Σ^{+}, E^{4}Π, and F^{4}Δ. Even higher levels are labelled G^{4}Π and H^{4}Δ from the quartet system, and d^{6}Σ^{−}, e^{6}Π, f^{6}Δ, and g^{6}Φ. In the quartet states the inner quantum number J takes on values 1/2, 3/2, 5/2, and 7/2.

band name	wavelength nm	wavenumber cm^{−1}	transition
Wing-Ford	989.6	10100	F^{4}Δ—X^{4}Δ
blue	490	20408	g^{6}Φ—a^{6}Δ
green	530	18867	e^{6}Π—a^{6}Δ

FeH has an important absorption band (called the Wing-Ford band) in the near infrared with a band edge at 989.652 nm and a maximum absorption at 991 nm. It also has lines in the blue at 470 to 502.5 nm and in green from 520 to 540 nm.

The small isotope shift of the deuterated FeD compared to FeH at this wavelength shows that the band is due to a (0,0) transition from the ground state, namely F^{4}Δ—X^{4}Δ.

Various other bands exists in each part of the spectrum due to different vibrational transitions. The (1,0) band, also due to F^{4}Δ—X^{4}Δ transitions, is around 869.0 nm and the (2,0) band around 781.8 nm.

Within each band there are a great number of lines. These are due to transition between different rotational states. The lines are grouped into subbands ^{4}Δ_{7/2}—^{4}Δ_{7/2} (strongest) and ^{4}Δ_{5/2}—^{4}Δ_{5/2}, ^{4}Δ_{3/2}—^{4}Δ_{3/2} and ^{4}Δ_{1/2}—^{4}Δ_{1/2}. The numbers like 7/2 are values for Ω the spin component. Each of these has two branches P and R, and some have a Q branch. Within each there is what is called Λ splitting that results in a lower energy lines (designated "a") and higher energy lines (called "b"). For each of these there is a series of spectral lines dependent on J, the rotational quantum number, starting from 3.5 and going up in steps of 1. How high J gets depends on the temperature. In addition there are 12 satellite branches ^{4}Δ_{7/2}—^{4}Δ_{5/2}, ^{4}Δ_{5/2}—^{4}Δ_{3/2}, ^{4}Δ_{3/2}—^{4}Δ_{1/2}, ^{4}Δ_{5/2}—^{4}Δ_{7/2}, ^{4}Δ_{3/2}—^{4}Δ_{5/2} and ^{4}Δ_{1/2}—^{4}Δ_{3/2} with P and R branches.

Some lines are magnetically sensitive, such as 994.813 and 995.825 nm. They are broadened by the Zeeman effect yet others in the same band are insensitive to magnetic fields like 994.911 and 995.677 nm. There are 222 lines in the (0-0) band spectrum.

== Occurrence in outer space ==
Iron hydride is one of the few molecules found in the Sun. Lines for FeH in the blue-green part of the solar spectrum were reported in 1972, including many absorption lines in 1972. Also sunspot umbras show up the Wing-Ford band prominently.

Bands for FeH (and other hydrides of transition metals and alkaline earths) show up prominently in the emission spectra for M dwarfs and L dwarfs, the hottest kind of brown dwarf. For cooler T dwarfs, the bands for FeH do not appear, probably due to liquid iron clouds blocking the view of the atmosphere, and removing it from the gas phase of the atmosphere. For even cooler brown dwarfs (<1350 K), signals for FeH reappear, which is explained by the clouds having gaps.

The explanation for the kind of stars that the FeH Wing-Ford band appears in, is that the temperature is around 3000 K and pressure is sufficient to have a large number of FeH molecules formed. Once the temperature reaches 4000 K as in a K dwarf the line is weaker due to more of the molecules being dissociated. In M giant red giants the gas pressure is too low for FeH to form.

Elliptical and lenticular galaxies also have an observable Wing-Ford band, due to a large amount of their light coming from M dwarfs.

In 2021, traces of FeH was confirmed to be present in the atmosphere of hot Jupiter WASP-79b.

== Production ==
Kleman and Åkerlind first produced FeH in the laboratory by heating iron to 2600 K in a King-type furnace under a thin hydrogen atmosphere.

Molecular FeH can also be obtained (together with FeH_{2} and other species) by vaporizing iron in an argon-hydrogen atmosphere and freezing the gas on a solid surface at about 10 K (-263 °C). The compound can be detected by infrared spectroscopy, and about half of it disappears when the sample is briefly warmed to 30 K. A variant technique uses pure hydrogen atmosphere condensed at 4 K.

This procedure also generates molecules that were thought to be FeH_{3} (ferric hydride) but were later assigned to an association of FeH and molecular hydrogen H_{2}.

Molecular FeH has been produced by the decay of ^{57}Co embedded in solid hydrogen. Mössbauer spectroscopy revealed an isomer shift of 0.59 mm/s compared with metallic iron and quadrupole splitting of 2.4 mm/s. FeH can also be produced by the interaction of Iron pentacarbonyl vapour and atomic hydrogen in a microwave discharge.

== See also ==
- Chromium hydride
- Magnesium monohydride
- Calcium monohydride

== Extra reading ==
- FeH Bibliography from ExoMol
