= Iron(II) hydride =

Names
- Systematic IUPAC name Dihydridoiron(4•)

Identifiers
CAS Number	33485-98-2
3D model (JSmol)	Interactive image
ChemSpider	124509
PubChem CID	141155
- InChI: InChI=1S/Fe.2H Key: FUEZNWLRTWZOHC-UHFFFAOYSA-N
- SMILES: [FeH2]

Properties
Chemical formula	FeH_{2}^{4•}
Molar mass	57.861 g mol^{−1}

Related compounds
Related compounds	iron hydrides, FeH, FeH3
- Except where otherwise noted, data are given for materials in their standard state (at 25 °C [77 °F], 100 kPa). Infobox references

Iron(II) hydride, systematically named iron dihydride and poly(dihydridoiron) is solid inorganic compound with the chemical formula (FeH_{2})_{n} (also written ([FeH_{2}])_{n} or FeH_{2}). It is kinetically unstable at ambient temperature, and as such, little is known about its bulk properties. However, it is known as a black, amorphous powder, which was synthesised for the first time in 2014.

Iron(II) hydride is the second simplest polymeric iron hydride (after iron(I) hydride). Due to its instability, it has no practical industrial uses. However, in metallurgical chemistry, iron(II) hydride is fundamental to certain forms of iron-hydrogen alloys.

== Nomenclature ==
The systematic name iron dihydride, a valid IUPAC name, is constructed according to the compositional nomenclature. However, as the name is compositional in nature, it does not distinguish between compounds of the same stoichiometry, such as molecular species, which exhibit distinct chemical properties. The systematic names poly(dihydridoiron) and poly[ferrane(2)], also valid IUPAC names, are constructed according to the additive and electron-deficient substitutive nomenclatures, respectively. They do distinguish the titular compound from the others.

== Dihydridoiron ==
Dihydridoiron, also systematically named ferrane(2), is a related inorganic compound with the chemical formula FeH_{2} (also written [FeH_{2}]). It is both kinetically unstable at concentration and at ambient temperature.

Dihydridoiron is the second simplest molecular iron hydride (after hydridoiron), and is also the progenitor of clusters with the same stoichiometry. In addition, it may be considered to be the iron(II) hydride monomer.

It has been observed in matrix isolation.

== Properties ==
=== Acidity and basicity ===
An electron pair of a Lewis base can join with the iron centre in dihydridoiron by adduction:

[FeH_{2}] + :L → [FeH_{2}L]

Because of this capture of an adducted electron pair, dihydridoiron has Lewis acidic character. Dihydridoiron has the capacity to capture up to four electron pairs from Lewis bases.

A proton can join with the iron centre by dissociative protonation:

FeH_{2} + H^{+} → FeH^{+} + H_{2}

Because dissociative protonation involves the capture of the proton (H^{+}) to form a Kubas complex ([FeH(H_{2})]^{+}) as an intermediate, dihydridoiron and its adducts of weak-field Lewis bases, such as water, also have Brønsted–Lowry basic character. They have the capacity to capture up to two protons. Its dissociated conjugate acids are hydridoiron(1+) and iron(2+) (FeH^{+} and Fe^{2+}).

FeH_{2} + H_{3}O^{+} ⇌ FeH^{+} + H_{2}O + H_{2}

Aqueous solutions of adducts of weak-field Lewis bases are however, unstable due to hydrolysis of the dihydridoiron and hydridoiron(1+) groups:

FeH_{2} + 2 H_{2}O → Fe(OH)_{2} + 2 H_{2}
FeH^{+} + 3 H_{2}O → Fe(OH)_{2} + H_{3}O^{+} + H_{2}

It should be expected that iron dihydride clusters and iron(II) hydride have similar acid-base properties, although reaction rates and equilibrium constants are different.

Alternatively, a hydrogen centre in the dihydridoiron group in adducts of strong-field Lewis bases, such as carbon monoxide, may separate from the molecule by ionisation:

[Fe(CO)_{4}H_{2}] → [Fe(CO)_{4}H]^{−} + H^{+}

Because of this release of the proton, adducts of strong-field Lewis bases have may have Brønsted–Lowry acidic character. They have the capacity to release up to two protons.

[Fe(CO)_{4}H_{2}] +H_{2}O ⇌ [Fe(CO)_{4}H]^{−} + H_{3}O^{+}

Mixed adducts with Lewis bases of differing fields strengths may exhibit intermediate behaviour.

=== Structure ===
In iron(II) hydride, the atoms form a network, individual atoms being interconnected by covalent bonds. Since it is a polymeric solid, a monocrystalline sample is not expected to undergo state transitions, such as melting and dissolution, as this would require the rearrangement of molecular bonds and consequently, change its chemical identity. Colloidal crystalline samples, wherein intermolecular forces are relevant, are expected to undergo state transitions.

At least up to −173 °C (−279 °F), iron(II) hydride is predicted to have a body-centred tetragonal crystalline structure with the I4/mmm space group. In this structure, iron centres have a capped square-antiprismatic coordination geometry, and hydrogen centres have square-planar and square-pyramidal geometries.

9-Coordinate Fe-centre	4-Coordinate H-centre	5-Coordinate H-centre

An amorphous form of iron(II) hydride is also known.

The infrared spectrum for dihydridoiron shows that the molecule has a linear H−Fe−H structure in the gas phase, with an equilibrium distance between the iron atom and the hydrogen atoms of 0.1665 nm.

Monomeric

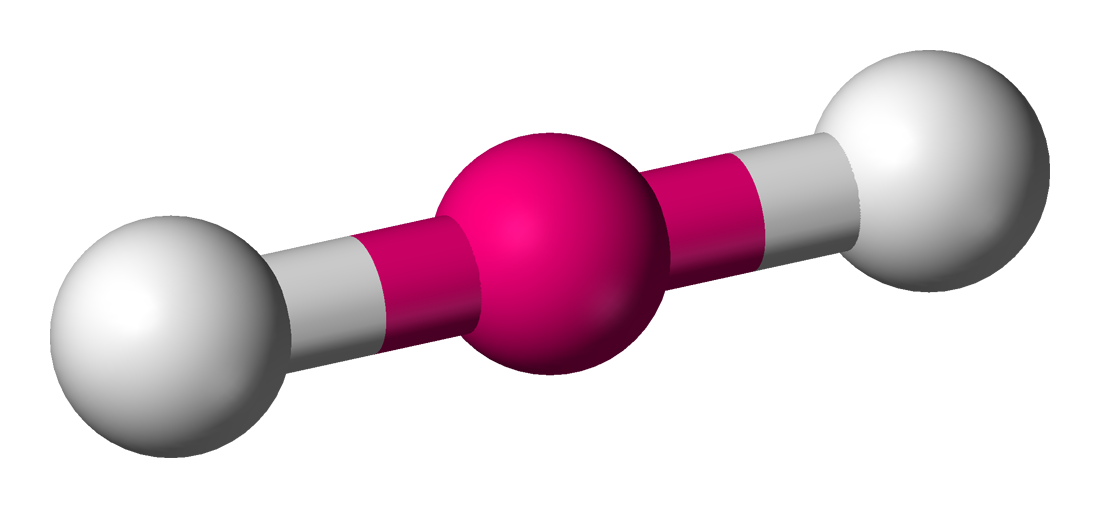

=== Electronic properties ===
State transitions of ^{56}FeH_{2} in the ν_{3} fundamental band
Transition	Wavenumber (cm^{−1})	Frequency (THz)
P_{4}(10)	1614.912	48.4100
P_{4}(7)	1633.519	48.9717
Q_{4}(4),Q_{3}(3)	1672.658	50.1450
Q_{4}(4),Q_{4}(5),Q_{3}(3)	1676.183	50.2507
R_{4}(4)	1704.131	51.0886
R_{4}(5)	1707.892	51.2013
R_{4}(8)	1725.227	51.7210
R_{4}(9)	1729.056	52.8358

A few of dihydridoiron's electronic states lie relatively close to each other, giving rise to varying degrees of radical chemistry. The ground state and the first two excited states are all quintet radicals with four unpaired electrons (X^{5}Δ_{g}, A^{5}Π_{g}, B^{5}Σ_{g}^{+}). With the first two excited states only 22 and 32 kJ mol^{−1} above the ground state, a sample of dihydridoiron contains trace quantities of excited states even at room temperature. Furthermore, Crystal field theory predicts that the low transition energies correspond to a colourless compound.

The ground electronic state is ^{5}Δ_{g}.

=== Metallurgical chemistry ===
In iron-hydrogen alloys that have hydrogen content near 3.48 wt%, hydrogen can precipitate as iron(II) hydride and lesser quantities of other polymeric iron hydrides. However, due to the limited solubility of hydrogen in iron, the optimum content for the formation of iron(II) hydride can only be reached by applying extreme pressure.

In metallurgical chemistry, iron(II) hydride is fundamental to certain forms of iron-hydrogen alloys. It occurs as a brittle component within the solid matrix, with a physical makeup that depends on its formation conditions and subsequent heat treatment. As it decomposes over time, the alloy will slowly become softer and more ductile, and may start to suffer from hydrogen embrittlement.

== Production ==
Dihydridoiron has been produced by several means, including:

- By reaction of FeCl_{2} and PhMgBr under a hydrogen atmosphere (1929).
- Electrical discharge in a mixture of pentacarbonyliron and dihydrogen diluted in helium at 8.5 Torr.
- Evaporation of iron with a laser in an atmosphere of hydrogen, pure or diluted in neon or argon, and condensing the products on a cold surface below 10 K.
- Decomposition product of collision-excited ferrocenium ions.

=== Iron reduction ===
Most iron(II) hydride is produced by iron reduction. In this process, stoichiometric amounts of iron and hydrogen react under an applied pressure of between approximately 45 and 75 GPa to produce iron(II) hydride according to the reaction:

nFe + nH_{2} → (FeH_{2})_{n}

The process involves iron(I) hydride as an intermediate, and occurs in two steps.

1. 2nFe + nH_{2} → 2(FeH)_{n}
2. 2(FeH)_{n} + nH_{2} → 2(FeH_{2})_{n}

=== Bis[bis(mesityl)iron] reduction ===
Amorphous iron(II) hydride is produced by bis[bis(mesityl)iron] reduction. In this process, bis[bis(mesityl)iron] is reduced with hydrogen under an applied pressure of 100 atmospheres to produce iron(II) hydride according to the reaction:

n [Fe(mes)_{2}]_{2} + 4n H_{2} → 2(FeH_{2})_{n} + 4n Hmes

The process involves bis[hydrido(mesityl)iron] and dihydridoiron as intermediates, and occurs in three steps.

1. [Fe(mes)_{2}]_{2} + 2H_{2} → [FeH(mes)]_{2} + 2 Hmes
2. [FeH(mes)]_{2} + H_{2} → FeH_{2} + Hmes
3. n FeH_{2} → (FeH_{2})_{n}

== Reactions ==
As dihydridoiron is an electron-deficient molecule, it spontaneously autopolymerises in its pure form, or converts to an adduct upon treatment with a Lewis base. Upon treatment of adducts of weak-field Lewis bases with a dilute standard acid, it converts to an hydridoiron(1+) salt and elemental hydrogen. Treatment of adducts of strong-field Lewis bases with a standard base, converts it to a metal ferrate(1−) salt and water. Oxidation of iron dihydrides give iron(II) hydroxide, whereas reduction gives hexahydridoferrate(4−) salts. Unless cooled to −243 °C (−405.4 °F) or below, dihydridoiron decomposes to produce elemental iron and hydrogen. Other iron dihydrides and adducts of dihydridoiron decompose at higher temperatures to also produce elemental hydrogen, and iron or polynuclear iron adducts:

FeH_{2} → Fe + H_{2}

Non-metals, including oxygen, strongly attack iron dihydrides, forming hydrogenated compounds and iron(II) compounds:

FeH_{2} + O_{2} → FeO + H_{2}O

Iron(II) compounds can also be prepared from an iron dihydride and an appropriate, concentrated acid:

FeH_{2} + 2 HCl → FeCl_{2} + 2 H_{2}

== History ==
Even though complexes containing dihydridoiron was known since 1931, the simple compound with the molecular formula FeH_{2} is only a much more recent discovery. Following the discovery of the first complex containing dihydridoiron, tetracarbonylate, it was also quickly discovered that it is not possible to remove the carbon monoxide by thermal means - heating an dihydridoiron containing complex only causes it to decompose, a habit attributable to the weak iron-hydrogen bond. Thus, a practical method has been sought since then for the production of the pure compound, without the involvement of a liquid phase. Furthermore, there is also on going research into its other adducts. Although iron(II) hydride has received attention only recently, complexes containing the dihydridoiron group have been known at least since 1931, when iron carbonyl hydride FeH_{2}(CO)_{4} was first synthesised. The most precisely characterised FeH_{2}L_{4} complex as of 2003 is FeH_{2}(CO)_{2}[P(OPh)_{3}]_{2}.

Complexes can also contain FeH_{2} with hydrogen molecules as a ligand. Those with one or two molecules of hydrogen are unstable, but FeH_{2}(H_{2})_{3} is stable and can be produced by the evaporation of iron into hydrogen gas.

From infrared spectra of samples of dihydridoiron trapped in frozen argon between 10 and 30 K, Chertihin and Andrews conjectured in 1995 that dihydridoiron readily dimerized into Fe_{2}H_{4}, and that it reacts with atomic hydrogen to produce trihydridoiron (FeH_{3}). However, it was later proven that the product of the reaction was likely to have been hydrido(dihydrogen)iron (FeH(H_{2})).
