= PKS 0054+018 =

Radio galaxy in the constellation Cetus

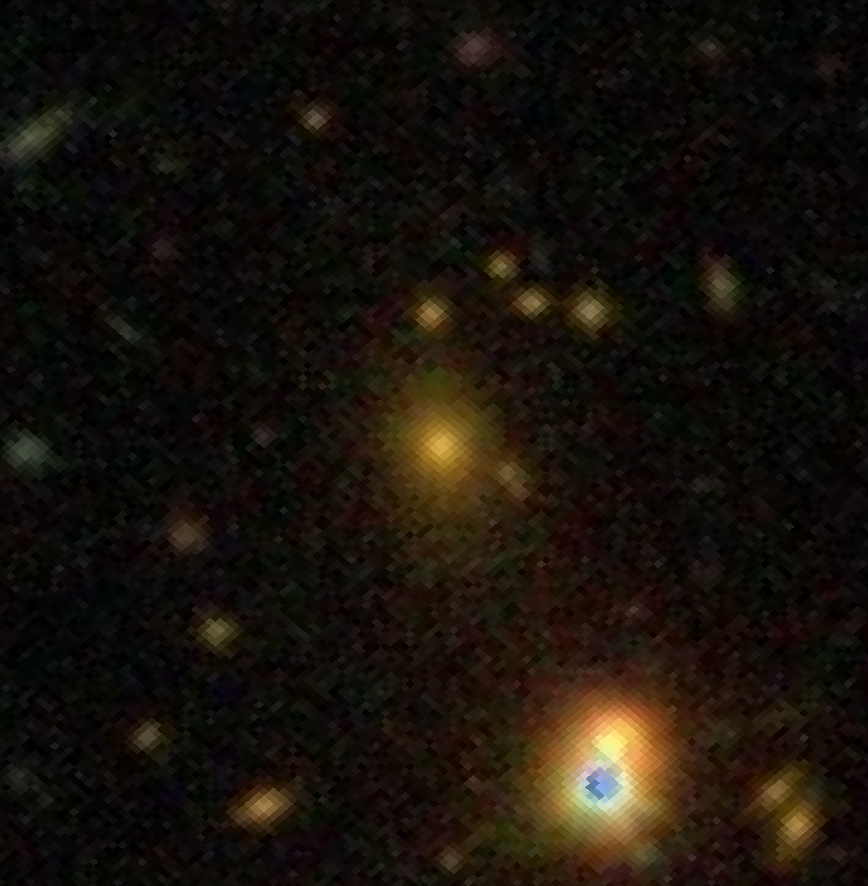
- SDSS image of PKS 0054+018

Observation data (J2000.0 epoch)
- Constellation: Cetus
- Right ascension: 00^{h} 57^{m} 27.88^{s}
- Declination: +02° 09′ 34.50″
- Redshift: 0.292362
- Heliocentric radial velocity: 87,648 ± 14 km/s
- Distance: 4,200.4 ± 294.0 Mly (1,287.85 ± 90.15 Mpc)
- Group or cluster: WHL J005727.9+020935
- magnitude (K): 13.11

Characteristics
- Type: Elliptical
- Size: ~623,000 ly (191.0 kpc) (estimated)

Other designations
- 2MASX J00572791+0209345, APMUKS(BJ) B005453.49+015322.2, LEDA 1217899, MRC 0054+018, NVSS J005727+020933, PKS B0054+018, RGZ J005727.8+020934, WHL J005727.9+020935 BCG

PKS 0054+018 also known as RGZ J005727.8+020934, is a radio galaxy located in the constellation of Cetus. The redshift of the galaxy has been estimated as (z) 0.292 and it was first discovered as an astronomical radio source by astronomers in October 1975. Subsequently, it was identified with a galaxy counterpart in November 1976.

== Description ==
PKS 0054+018 is a Fanaroff-Riley Class Type I radio galaxy residing as the brightest cluster galaxy (BCG) of the galaxy cluster, WHL J005727.9+020935 with 39 confirmed galaxy member candidates. The total r-band magnitude of the galaxy is 17.32 magnitude and its absolute magnitude is -23.67. There is no evidence of an extended emission-line region (EELR).

The galaxy contains an extended radio source depicted as a double based on radio imaging made by the Very Large Array (VLA), with the total flux density of 0.550 mJy at 1.5 GHz frequencies and 0.160 at 4.9 GHz frequencies. A total spectral index is calculated to be 0.95α.

The total radio luminosity of the source at 1.4 GHz is estimated to be 25.9 W Hz^{−1} and the largest projected size is 182 kiloparsecs. The radio power is calculated to be 119.18 × 10^{24} WHz^{−1} and the flux density is 433.0 mJy at 1.4 GHz, obtained by the NRAO VLA Sky Survey (NVSS).

The radio source is bent, with an angle of 14.3°, with an excess bending angle of 8.7°. The source tail is also radically bent in respect to the cluster. The optical spectrum of the galaxy displays strong signatures of emission lines, including hydrogen-beta, magnesium b triplet and calcium monohydride.
