= Iron hydride =

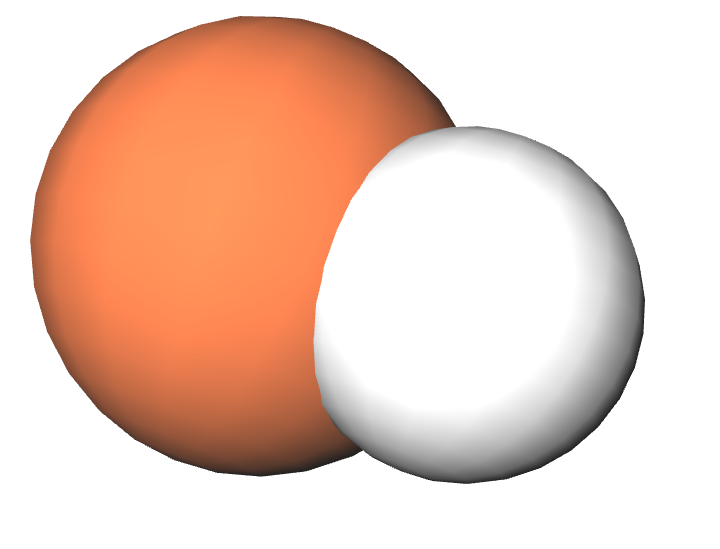
Space-filling model of the iron(I) hydride (FeH) free molecule.

An iron hydride is a chemical system which contains iron and hydrogen in some associated form.

Because of the common occurrence of those two elements in the universe, possible compounds of hydrogen and iron have attracted attention. A few molecular compounds have been detected in extreme environments (such as stellar atmospheres) or in small amounts at very low temperatures. The two elements form a metallic alloy above 35,000 standard atmospheres (3.5 GPa) of pressure, that has been advanced as a possible explanation for the low density of Earth's "iron" core. However those compounds are unstable when brought to ambient conditions, and eventually decompose into the separate elements.

Small amounts of hydrogen (up to about 0.08% by weight) are absorbed into iron as it solidifies from its molten state. Although the H_{2} is simply an impurity, its presence can affect the material's mechanical properties.

Despite the fleeting nature of binary iron hydrides, there are many fairly stable complexes containing iron-hydrogen bonds (and other elements).

== Overview ==
=== Solid solutions ===
Iron and iron-based alloys can form solid solutions with hydrogen, which under extreme pressure may reach stoichiometric proportions, remaining stable even at high temperatures and surviving for a while under ambient pressure, at temperatures below 150K.

=== Binary compounds ===
==== Molecular compounds ====
- Hydridoiron (FeH). This molecule has been detected in the atmosphere of the Sun and some red dwarf stars. It is stable only as a gas, above the boiling point of iron, or as traces in frozen noble gases below 30 K (where it may form complexes with molecular hydrogen, such as FeH·H_{2}).
- Dihydridoiron (FeH_{2}). This compound has been obtained only in rarefied gases or trapped in frozen gases below 30 K (−243 °C), decomposing into the elements on warming. It may form a dimer Fe_{2}H_{4} and complexes with molecular hydrogen, such as FeH_{2}(H_{2})_{2} and FeH_{2}(H_{2})_{3}.
- What was once believed to be trihydridoiron (FeH_{3}) was later shown to be FeH bound to molecular hydrogen H_{2}.

==== Polymeric network compounds ====
- Iron(I) hydride. It is stable at pressures exceeding 3.5 GPa.
- Iron(II) hydride or ferrous hydride. It is stable at pressures between 45 and 75 GPa.
- Iron(III) hydride or ferric hydride. It is stable at pressures exceeding 65 GPa.
- Iron pentahydride FeH_{5} is a polyhydride, where there is more hydrogen than expected by valence rules. It is stable under pressures over 85 GPa. It contains alternating sheets of FeH_{3} and atomic hydrogen.

=== Iron-hydrogen complexes ===
Complexes displaying iron–hydrogen bonds include, for example:

- iron tetracarbonyl hydride FeH_{2}(CO)_{4}, the first such compound to be synthesised (1931).
- FeH_{2}(CO)_{2}[P(OPh)_{3}]_{2}.
- Salts of the FeH_{6}^{4−} anion, such as magnesium iron hexahydride, Mg_{2}FeH_{6}, produced by treating mixtures of magnesium and iron powders with high pressures of H_{2}.
- Di- and polyiron hydrides, e.g. [HFe_{2}(CO)_{8}]^{−} and the cluster [HFe_{3}(CO)_{11}]^{−}.

Complexes are also known with molecular hydrogen (H_{2}) ligands.

== Biological occurrence ==
Methanogens, archaea, bacteria and some unicellular eukaryotes contain hydrogenase enzymes that catalyse metabolic reactions involving free hydrogen, whose active site is an iron atom with Fe–H bonds as well as other ligands.

== See also ==
- Iron–hydrogen alloy
