= ExoMol =

ExoMol is a database of molecular line lists that can be used for spectral characterisation and simulation of astrophysical environments such as exoplanets, brown dwarfs, cool stars and sunspots. The project is run by the theoretical molecular physics group of University College London and is led by Jonathan Tennyson. New line lists for about 30 small molecules of astrophysical interest that currently lack a complete spectroscopic coverage are being generated. The list includes diatomics (e.g., C_{2}, O_{2}, AlO, MgH, CaH, FeH), triatomics (e.g., H_{2}O, H_{2}S, C_{3}, SO_{2}), tetratomics (e.g., PH_{3}, HOOH, H_{2}CO) and a few larger molecules (most notably CH_{4} and HNO_{3}). Full details on the ExoMol web site (www.exomol.com).
