= Chromium(II) hydride =

Chromium dihydride
Names
- Other names Chromium dihydride

Identifiers
CAS Number	13966-81-9
3D model (JSmol)	Interactive image
ChemSpider	24769800
PubChem CID	12132694
- InChI: InChI=1S/Cr.2H Key: YAWAIQPUSWNPRE-UHFFFAOYSA-N
- SMILES: [Cr].[H].[H]

Properties
Chemical formula	CrH_{2}
Molar mass	54.0040 g/mol
Appearance	brown solid

Related compounds
Related compounds	Chromium(I) hydride; Chromium hydride
- Except where otherwise noted, data are given for materials in their standard state (at 25 °C [77 °F], 100 kPa). Infobox references

Chromium(II) hydride, systematically named chromium dihydride and poly(dihydridochromium) is pale brown solid inorganic compound with the chemical formula (CrH_{2})_{n} (also written ([CrH_{2}])_{n} or CrH_{2}). Although it is thermodynamically unstable toward decomposition at ambient temperatures, it is kinetically metastable. It is the second simplest polymeric chromium hydride (after chromium(I) hydride).

== Nomenclature ==
The most common name for chromium(II) hydride is chromium dihydride, following the IUPAC compositional nomenclature. Because the compositional name does not distinguish between different compounds with stoichiometry CrH_{2}, "chromium dihydride" is ambiguous between an unstable molecular species (see § Monomer) and the metastable (but common) polymeric form.

== Structure and properties ==
=== Monomer ===
The chromium(II) hydride monomer, is both thermodynamically and kinetically unstable towards autopolymerization at ambient temperature, and so cannot be concentrated. Nevertheless, molecules of CrH_{2} and Cr_{2}H_{4} have been isolated in solid gas matrices.

=== Dimer ===
In diluted CrH_{2}, the molecules are known to oligomerise forming at least Cr_{2}H_{4} (dimers), being connected by covalent bonds. The dissociation enthalpy of the dimer is estimated to be 121 kJ mol^{−1}. CrH_{2} is bent, and is weakly repulsive to one hydrogen molecule, but attractive to two molecules of hydrogen. The bond angle is 118±5°. The stretching force constant is 1.64 mdyn / Å. The dimer has a distorted rhombus structure with C_{2h} symmetry.

== Production ==
The dimer is produced synthetically by hydrogenation. In this process, chromium and hydrogen react according to the reaction:

Cr + H2 → HCr(μ-H)_{2}CrH

This process involves atomic chromium as an intermediate, and occurs in two steps. The hydrogenation (step 2) is a spontaneous process.

1. Cr (s) → Cr (g)
2. Cr (g) + H_{2} (g) → HCr(μ-H)_{2}CrH (g)

In an inert gas matrix atomic Cr reacts with H_{2} to make the dihydride when it is irradiated with ultraviolet light between 320 and 380 nm. The reaction of chromium with molecular hydrogen is endothermic. 380 nm or greater wavelength radiation is required to procure photochemically generated CrH_{2}.

== Uses ==
In metallurgical chemistry, chromium(II) hydride is fundamental to certain forms of chromium-hydrogen alloys.

== Reactions ==
In the presence of pure hydrogen, dihydridochromium readily converts to bis(dihydrogen)dihydridochromium, CrH_{2}(H_{2})_{2} in an exothermic reaction.

== History ==
In 1979 the simplest molecular chromium(II) hydride with the chemical formula CrH_{2} (systematically named dihydridochromium) was synthesised and identified for the first time. It was synthesised directly from the elements, in a reaction sequence which consisted of simultaneous sublimation of chromium to atomic chromium and thermolysis of hydrogen, and concluded with co-deposition in a cryogenic argon matrix to form dihydridochromium.

In 2003 the dimer with the chemical formula HCr(μ-H)_{2}CrH (systematically named di-μ-hydrido-bis(hydridochromium)) was synthesised and identified for the first time. It was also synthesised directly from the elements, in a reaction sequence which consisted of laser ablation of chromium to atomic chromium, followed by co-deposition with hydrogen in a cryogenic matrix to produce dihydridochromium, and concluded with annealing to form didi-μ-hydrido-bis(hydridochromium).
