= WASP-79b =

Exoplanet

WASP-79b / Pollera
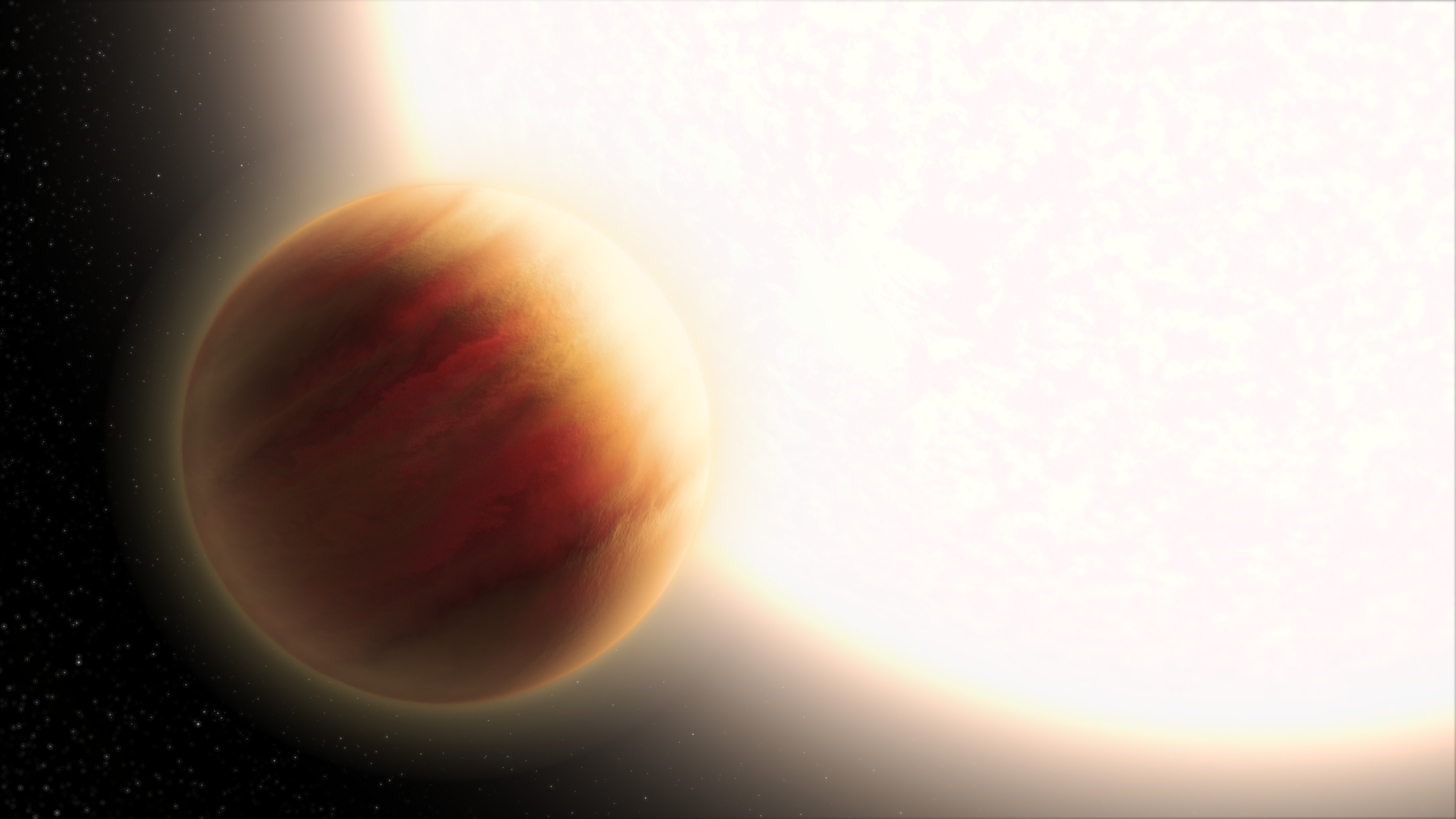
- Artist impression of WASP-79b

Discovery
- Discovered by: Smalley et al.
- Discovery date: June 1 2012
- Detection method: Transit method

Orbital characteristics
- Semi-major axis: 0.05014+0.00034 −0.00035 AU
- Eccentricity: 0
- Orbital period (sidereal): 3.66239094(60) days
- Inclination: 85.52°±0.1°
- Star: WASP-79

Physical characteristics
- Mean radius: 1.756±0.031 R_{J}
- Mass: 0.835±0.077 M_{J}
- Temperature: 1,747±27 K

WASP-79b, also known as Pollera, is an extrasolar planet orbiting the star WASP-79 (Montuno). This planet is in the constellation Eridanus, and is about 780 light-years from Earth.

The name Pollera was selected in the NameExoWorlds campaign by Panama, during the 100th anniversary of the IAU. A pollera is the traditional costume the woman wears in the "El Punto", a Panamanian dance.

== Characteristics ==
WASP-79b is a very large hot Jupiter that is among the largest exoplanets discovered although its size is uncertain. The discovery paper estimated it to be 2.09 ± 0.14 R_{J} (approximately 300,000 kilometers across) with a temperature of 1,900 ± 50 K, but modern studies give a lower radius of 1.756±0.031 R_{J} and a temperature of 1,747±27 K.

The planet is orbiting the host star at nearly polar orbit with respect to star's equatorial plane, inclination being equal to −95.2^{+0.9}_{−1.0}°.

In 2019 and 2020, the transmission spectra of WASP-79b were taken utilizing HST and Spitzer Space Telescope, with best fit being the hazy atmosphere containing about 1% water and traces of iron(I) hydride. The presence of iron hydride was confirmed in 2021, along with tentative detection of vanadium oxide. Also, in 2022 an atmospheric sodium has been detected.

== See also ==
- GQ Lupi b
- WASP-17b
- TrES-4b
