= Second solar spectrum =

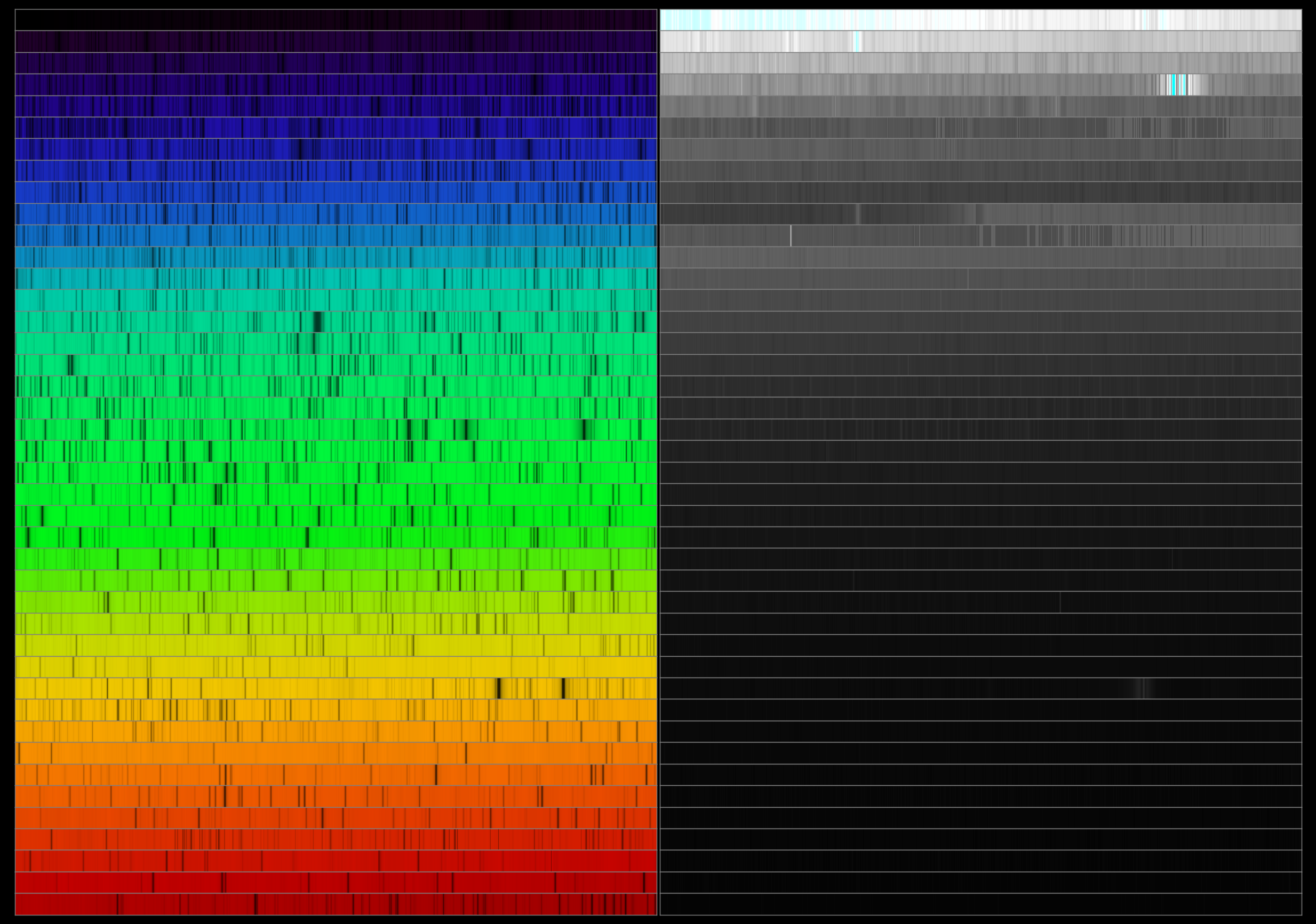
A visualization of the visible part of the solar spectrum (left) and second solar spectrum at the solar limb (right). The intensity spectrum is coloured to mimic a spectrograph observation, while the linear polarization is proportional to the brightness.

The second solar spectrum is an electromagnetic spectrum of the Sun that shows the degree of linear polarization. The term was coined by V. V. Ivanov in 1991. The polarization is at a maximum close to the limb (edge) of the Sun, thus the best place to observe such a spectrum is from just inside the limb. It is also possible to get polarized light from outside the limb, but since this is much dimmer compared to the disk of the Sun, it is very easily polluted by scattered light.

The second solar spectrum differs significantly from the solar spectrum determined by the intensity of light. Large effects come around the Ca II K and H line. These have broad effects 200 Å wide and show a sign reversal at their centers. Molecular lines with stronger polarization than the background due to MgH and C_{2} are common. Rare-earth elements stand out far more than expected from the intensity spectrum.

Other odd lines include Li I at 6708 Å which has 0.005% more polarization at its peak, but is almost unobservable in the intensity spectrum. The Ba II 4554 Å appears as a triplet in the second solar spectrum. This is due to differing isotopes and hyperfine structure.

Two lines at 5896 Å 4934 Å being the D_{1} lines of sodium and barium were predicted not to be polarized, but nevertheless are present in this spectrum.

== Continuum ==
The continuum in the spectrum is the light with wavelengths between the lines. Polarization in the continuum is due to Rayleigh scattering by neutral hydrogen atoms (H I) and Thomson scattering by free electrons. Most of the opacity in the sun is due to the hydride ion, H^{−} which however does not alter polarization. In 1950 Subrahmanyan Chandrasekhar came up with a solution for the degree of polarization due to scattering, and predicted 11.7% polarization at the limb of the Sun. But nowhere near this level is observed. What happens at the limb is that there is a forest of spicules poking out from the edge, so it is not possible to get parallel to such a rough surface.

For most of the solar disk the degree of linear polarization of the continuum is under 0.1%, but it rises to 1% at the limb. The polarization also depends strongly on the wavelength, and for near ultraviolet 3000 Å the light near the limb is 100 times more polarized than red light at 7000 Å. At the limit of the Balmer series a change happens where at shorter wavelengths more bound-bound Balmer series transitions cause more opacity. This extra opacity drops the polarization degree by a factor of two near 3746 Å.
