= Chromium(I) hydride =

Chromium hydride
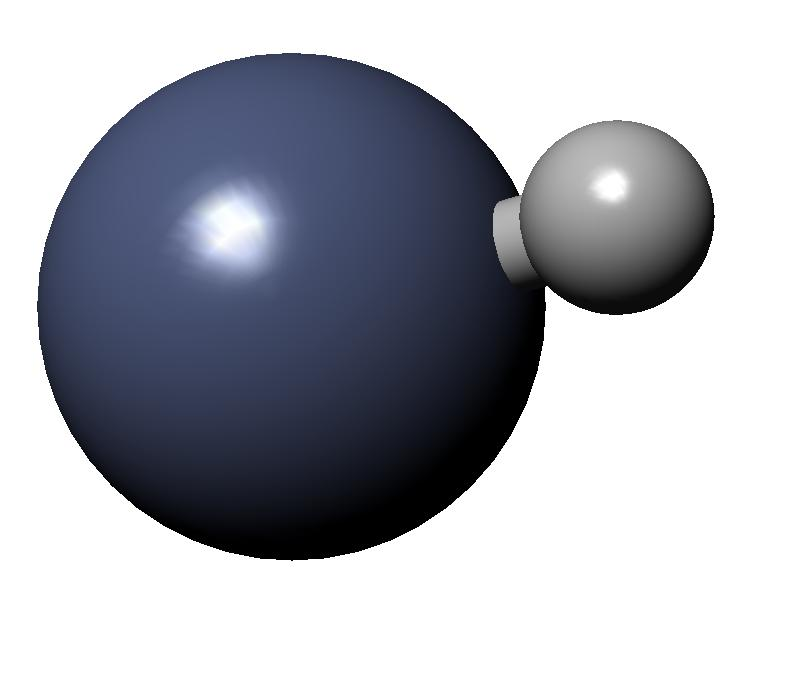
- Stick and ball model of chromium hydride molecule

Names
- Other names Chromium monohydride chromhydrid

Identifiers
| CAS Number | 13966-79-5 |
| 3D model (JSmol) | Interactive image |
| ChemSpider | 29331166 |
| PubChem CID | 57456817 |
- InChI: InChI=1S/Cr.H/q+1;-1 Key: UUWBKSAWTLMFGW-UHFFFAOYSA-N; InChI=1/Cr.H/q+1;-1 Key: UUWBKSAWTLMFGW-UHFFFAOYAP
- SMILES: [H-].[Cr+]

Properties
| Chemical formula | CrH |
| Molar mass | 53.0040 g/mol |
| Appearance | Colorless gas |

Related compounds
| Related compounds | Iron(I) hydride |
- Except where otherwise noted, data are given for materials in their standard state (at 25 °C [77 °F], 100 kPa). Infobox references

Chromium(I) hydride, systematically named chromium hydride, is an inorganic compound with the chemical formula (CrH)_{n} (also written as ([CrH])_{n} or CrH). It occurs naturally in some kinds of stars where it has been detected by its spectrum. However, molecular chromium(I) hydride with the formula CrH has been isolated in solid gas matrices. The molecular hydride is very reactive. As such the compound is not well characterised, although many of its properties have been calculated via computational chemistry.

== Molecular forms ==
A. G. Gaydon first created CrH gas with an electric arc between chromium electrodes in a hydrogen air flame. CrH can be formed by the reaction of chromium metal vapour, created by an electrical discharge in the presence of hydrogen. The electric discharge breaks up the H_{2} molecules into reactive H atoms. So the reaction then proceeds as Cr(g) + H → CrH.

Another method to make CrH is to react chromium carbonyl (Cr(CO)_{6}) vapour with atomic hydrogen generated by an electric discharge.

Chromium hydride can also be formed by reacting chromium with methane in an electric arc. This also produces a variety of carbon and hydrogen containing chromium molecules such as CrCH_{3} and CrCCH. Also it is possible to trap CrH into a solid argon noble gas matrix. The solid argon does not react with CrH and allows studying reactive molecules that need to be kept apart from other molecules. The researchers that produced the trapped CrH molecules also believe that they made and trapped CrH_{2} molecules, based on its spectrum.

=== Properties ===
When produced in the reaction with chromium vapour in an electric discharge, the chromium hydride gas glows with a bright bluish-green colour.

The ground electronic state of CrH is ^{6}Σ^{+}. The outer electronic configuration is σ^{2}σ^{1}δ^{2}π^{2}. The σ^{2} electron is the bonding electron with hydrogen, and the other electrons are unpaired. The only part of the molecule with nuclear spin, is the proton in the hydrogen. Hyperfine structure of the spectral lines is extremely fine. The Fermi contact term which measures the hyperfine splitting is only -34.43 MHz, whereas for the hydrogen atom it is 1420.40575177 MHz.

The dipole moment of the molecule is 3.864 Debye.

The disassociation energy required to break the molecule into two atoms is 2.118 eV or 1.93 eV.

The CrH molecule is strongly paramagnetic. It can have a lifetime of over 0.1 seconds when it is trapped in ^{3}He cooled to 0.650 K.

=== Spectrum ===
Like other molecules, the CrH molecule can store energy in several ways. Firstly, the molecule can spin with the hydrogen atom seeming to orbit the chromium atom. Secondly, it can vibrate with the two atoms bouncing towards and away from each other. Thirdly, electrons can change from one atomic orbital to another in the chromium atom. All of these can happen at the same time. All the numerous combinations of changes result in many different possible energy changes. Each of these changes will match a frequency in the electromagnetic spectrum which is absorbed. When many of these frequencies cluster together in a group, an absorption band results.

An ultraviolet spectral band between 360 and 370 nm was discovered in 1937. A^{6}Σ^{+}–X^{6}Σ^{+} transition is observed in S type stars and sunspots and also L type brown dwarfs.

=== Submillimeter ===
Changes in the rotational rate of the molecule lead to a far-infrared spectrum. N=1→0 transition has line frequencies at 5/2 → 3/2 337.259145 GHz, 5/2 → 7/2 362.617943 GHz and 362.627794 GHz, and 5/2 → 5/2 396.541818 GHz and 396.590874 GHz. N=2→1 735 GHz; N=3→2 at 1.11 THz N=4→3 at 1.47 THz

Kleman & Uhler observed the infrared spectrum and were the first to note absorption bands.

=== Occurrence in stars ===
The existence of CrH in stars was only established in 1980 when spectral lines were identified in S-type stars and sunspots. CrH was discovered in brown dwarfs in 1999. Along with FeH, CrH became useful in classifying L dwarfs. The CrH spectrum was identified in a large sunspot in 1976, but the lines are much less prominent than FeH.

Concentration of CrH in the L5 type of brown dwarf is 3 parts per billion compared to H, whereas the normal abundance of chromium is 0.5 parts per million compared to Hydrogen. In S-type stars a series of unknown lines appeared in the near infrared spectrum. They were termed the Keenan bands based on a spectrum of R Cyg. One of the bands with a band head at 861.11 nm was identified as due to CrH.

CrH is used to classify the L-type brown dwarfs into subtypes L0 to L8. The CrH absorption band is a diagnostic feature of L-type stars. For subtypes of the L-type brown dwarfs, L5 to L8 the CrH band at 861.1 nm is more prominent than the FeH band at 869.2 nm and for L4 these two bands are equally strong. For L0 type stars, TiO lines are similar in strength to CrH lines, and in L1 Ti0 lines are slightly weaker than CrH. L1 to L3 have FeH band stronger than the CrH.

=== Chromium(II) hydride ===
A related chemical compound, is the more stable chromium(II) hydride, identified by Weltner et al. in 1979 using a solid argon matrix. This compound is susceptible to dimerisation in the gas phase. The dimer is more stable than the monomer by 121 kJ mol^{−1}. Chromium(II) hydride is the most hydrogenated, groundstate classical hydride of chromium. CrH_{2} is predicted to be bent, rather than linear in shape. The bond angle is 118±5°. The stretching force constant is 1.64 mdyn / Å. In an inert gas matrix atomic Cr reacts with H_{2} to make the dihydride when it is irradiated with ultraviolet light between 320 and 380 nm. The CAS number is 13966-81-9.

=== Non-classical hydrides ===
Other nonclassical hydrides also exist. They include dihydrogen molecules as a ligand, such as CrH(H_{2}), CrH_{2}(H_{2}), CrH_{2}(H_{2})_{2}. The nonclassical hydrides are formed by reacting chromium(I) or chromium(II) hydride with dihydrogen gas, with optional inert gas. Chromium trihydride excimer is formed when CrH_{2}(H_{2}) is subjected to green or yellow light.
