= Magnesium monohydride =

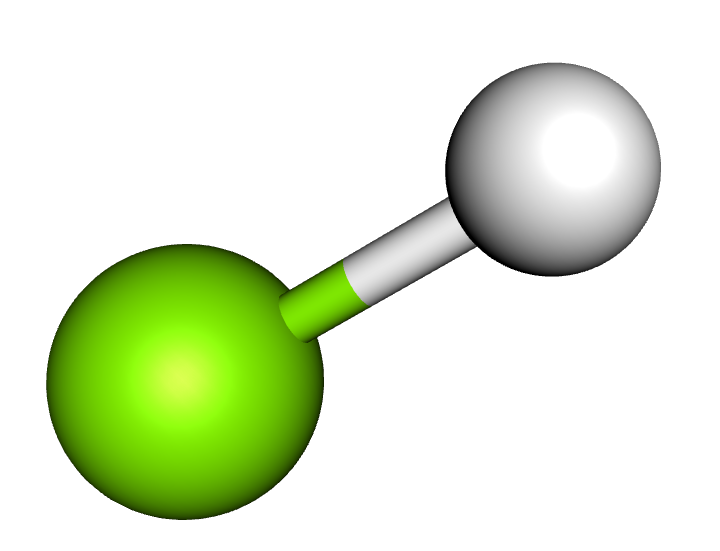
- Magnesium monohydride

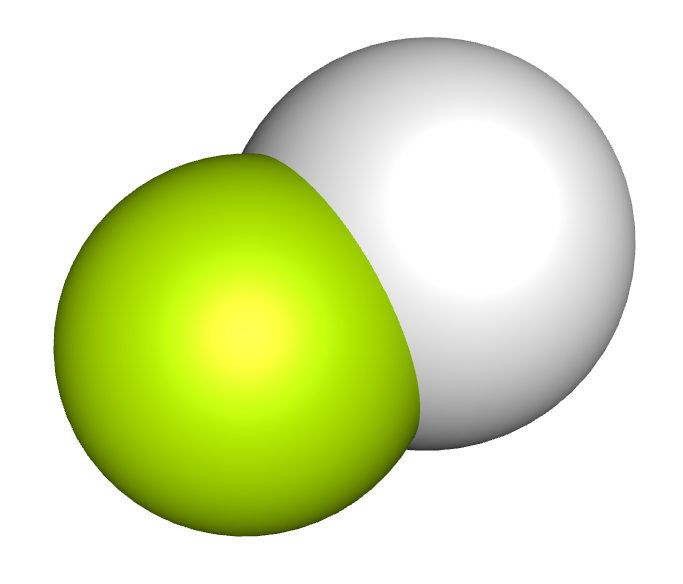

Names
- IUPAC name Magnesium monohydride
- Other names Magnesium(I) hydride, Hydridomagnesium(•)

Identifiers
CAS Number	14332-53-7
3D model (JSmol)	Interactive image
- InChI: InChI=1S/Mg.H Key: RZCHRULKKYOSQS-UHFFFAOYSA-N
- SMILES: [H].[Mg]

Properties
Chemical formula	MgH
Molar mass	25.313 g/mol
Appearance	green glowing gas
Solubility in water	reacts violently

Related compounds
Other cations	Beryllium monohydride; Calcium monohydride; Strontium monohydride; Barium monohydride; Potassium hydride
Related Magnesium hydrides	Magnesium hydride; Tetramagnesium hexahydride
- Except where otherwise noted, data are given for materials in their standard state (at 25 °C [77 °F], 100 kPa). Infobox references

Magnesium monohydride is a molecular gas with formula MgH that exists at high temperatures, such as the atmospheres of the Sun and stars. It was originally known as magnesium hydride, although that name is now more commonly used when referring to the similar chemical magnesium dihydride.

== History ==
George Downing Liveing and James Dewar are claimed to be the first to make and observe a spectral line from MgH in 1878. However they did not realise what the substance was.

== Formation ==
A laser can evaporate magnesium metal to form atoms that react with molecular hydrogen gas to form MgH and other magnesium hydrides.

An electric discharge through hydrogen gas at low pressure (20 pascals) containing pieces of magnesium can produce MgH.

Thermally produced hydrogen atoms and magnesium vapour can react and condense in a solid argon matrix. This process does not work with solid neon, probably due to the formation of MgH_{2} instead.

A simple way to produce some MgH is to burn magnesium in a bunsen burner flame, where there is enough hydrogen to form MgH temporarily. Magnesium arcs in steam also produce MgH, but also produce MgO.

Natural formation of MgH happens in stars, brown dwarfs, and large planets, where the temperature is high enough. The reaction that produces it is either 2 Mg + H_{2} → 2 MgH or Mg + H → MgH. Decomposition is by the reverse process. Formation requires the presence of magnesium gas. The amount of magnesium gas is greatly reduced in cool stars by its extraction in clouds of enstatite, a magnesium silicate. Otherwise in these stars, below any magnesium silicate clouds where the temperature is hotter, the concentration of MgH is proportional to the square root of the pressure, and concentration of magnesium, and 10^{−4236/T}. MgH is the second most abundant magnesium containing gas (after atomic magnesium) in the deeper hotter parts of planets and brown dwarfs.

The reaction of Mg atoms with H_{2} (dihydrogen gas) is actually endothermic and proceeds when magnesium atoms are excited electronically. The magnesium atom inserts into the bond between the two hydrogen atoms to create a temporary MgH_{2} molecule, which spins rapidly and breaks up into a spinning MgH molecule and a hydrogen atom. The MgH molecules produced have a bimodal distribution of rotation rates. When protium is changed for deuterium in this reaction the distribution of rotations remains unchanged. (Mg + D_{2} or Mg +HD). The low rotation rate products also have low vibration levels, and so are "cold".

== Properties ==
=== Spectrum ===
The far infrared contains the rotational spectrum of MgH ranging from 0.3 to 2 THz. This also contains hyperfine structure. ^{24}MgH is predicted to have spectral lines for various rotational transition for the following vibrational levels.

Rotation	Vibrational level frequency (GHz)			
Rotation	0	1	2	3
1-0	343.68879	332.92012	321.68306	309.86369
2-1	687.10305	665.59200	643.11285	619.46374
3-2	1030.07630	997.76743	964.03611	928.54056

The infrared vibration rotation bands are in the range 800–2200 cm^{−1}. The fundamental vibration mode is at 6.7 μm. Three isotopes of magnesium and two of hydrogen multiply the band spectra with six isotopomers: ^{24}MgH ^{25}MgH ^{26}MgH ^{24}MgD ^{25}MgD ^{26}MgD. Vibration and rotation frequencies are significantly altered by the different masses of the atoms.

The visible band spectrum of magnesium hydride was first observed in the 19th century, and was soon confirmed to be due to a combination of magnesium and hydrogen. Whether there was actually a compound was debated due to no solid material being able to be produced. Despite this the term magnesium hydride was used for whatever made the band spectrum. This term was used before magnesium dihydride was discovered. The spectral bands had heads with fluting in the yellow green, green, and blue parts of the visible spectrum.

The yellow green band of the MgH spectrum is around the wavelength 5622 Å. The blue band is 4845 Å

The main band of MgH in the visible spectrum is due to electronic transition between the A^{2}Π→X^{2}Σ^{+} levels combined with transitions in rotational and vibrational state.

For each electronic transition, there are different bands for changes between the different vibrational states. The transition between vibrational states is represented using parenthesis (n,m), with n and m being numbers. Within each band there are many lines organised into three sets called branches. The P, Q and R branch are distinguished by whether the rotational quantum number increases by one, stays the same or decreases by one. Lines in each branch will have different rotational quantum numbers depending on how fast the molecules are spinning. For the A^{2}Π→X^{2}Σ^{+} transition the lowest vibrational level transitions are the most prominent, however the A^{2}Π energy level can have a vibration quantum state up to 13. Any higher level and the molecule has too much energy and shakes apart. For each level of vibrational energy there are a number of different rates of rotation that the molecule can sustain. For level 0 the maximum rotational quantum number is 49. Above this rotation rate it would spin so fast it would break apart. Then for subsequently higher vibrational levels from 2 to 13 the number of maximum rotational levels decreasing going through the sequence 47, 44, 42, 39, 36, 33, 30, 27, 23, 19, 15, 11 and 6.

The B'^{2}Σ^{+}→X^{2}Σ^{+} system is a transition from a slightly higher electronic state to the ground state. It also has lines in the visible spectrum that are observable in sunspots. The bands are headless. The (0,0) band is weak compared to the (0,3), (0,4), (0,5), (0,6), (0,7), (1,3), (1,4), (1,7), and (1,8) vibrational bands.

The C^{2}Π state has rotational parameters of B = 6.104 cm^{−1}, D = 0.0003176 cm ^{−1}, A = 3.843 cm^{−1}, and p = -0.02653 cm^{−1}. It has an energy level of 41242 cm^{−1}.

Another ^{2}Δ electronic level has energy 42192 cm^{−1} and rotation parameters B = 6.2861 cm^{−1} and A = -0.168 cm^{−1}.

The ultraviolet has many more bands due to higher energy electronic states.

The UV spectrum contains band heads at 3100 Å due to a vibrational transition (1,0) 2940 Å (2,0) 2720 Å (3,0) 2640 Å (0,1) 2567 Å (1,3).

colour	band wavelength	band head	vibration transition	strength
green	4950-5330	5212	(0.0)	strongest degrades to violet
		5182	(1,1)	strong
		5155	(2,2)	strong
blue	4844			
yellow green	5622	5621	(0,1)	quite strong
		5568	(1,2)	weak
		5516	(2,3)	weak
		6083	(0,2)	weak
UV	2350-2330	2348.8	(0,0) and (1,1) Q branch of ^{2}Π→X^{2}Σ^{+}	violet degraded
UV		2329		weak violet degraded

=== Physical ===
The magnesium monohydride molecule is a simple diatomic molecule with a magnesium atom bonded to a hydrogen atom. The distance between hydrogen and magnesium atoms is 1.7297Å. The ground state of magnesium monohydride is X^{2}Σ^{+}. Due to the simple structure the symmetry point group of the molecule is C_{∞v}. The moment of inertia of one molecule is 4.805263×10^{−40} g cm^{2}.

The bond has significant covalent character. The dipole moment is 1.215 Debye.

Bulk properties of the MgH gas include enthalpy of formation of 229.79 kJ mol^{−1}, entropy 193.20 J K^{−1} mol^{−1} and heat capacity of 29.59 J K^{−1} mol^{−1}.

The dissociation energy of the molecule is 1.33 eV. Ionization potential is around 7.9 eV with the MgH^{+} ion formed when the molecule loses an electron.

== Dimer ==
In noble gas matrices MgH can form two kinds of dimer: HMgMgH and a rhombic shaped (◊) (HMg)_{2} in which a dihydrogen molecule bridges the bond between two magnesium atoms. MgH also can form a complex with dihydrogen HMg·H_{2}. Photolysis increases reactions which form the dimer. The energy to break up the dimer HMgMgH into two MgH radicals is 197 kJ/mol. Mg(μ-H_{2})Mg has 63 kJ/mol more energy than HMgMgH. In theory gas phase HMgMgH can decompose to Mg_{2} and H_{2} releasing 24 kJ/mol of energy exothermically. The distance between the magnesium atoms in HMgMgH is calculated to be 2.861 Å. HMgMgH can be considered a formal base compound for other substances LMgMgL that have a magnesium to magnesium bond. In these magnesium can be considered to be in oxidation state +1 rather than the normal +2. However these sorts of compounds are not made from HMgMgH.

== Related ions ==
MgH^{+} can be made by protons hitting magnesium, or dihydrogen gas H_{2} interacting with singly ionized magnesium atoms (H_{2} + Mg^{+} → MgH^{+} + H).

MgH^{−}, MgH^{−}_{3} and MgH^{−}_{2} are formed from low pressure hydrogen or ammonia over a magnesium cathode. The trihydride ion is produced the most, and in a greater proportion when pure hydrogen is used rather than ammonia. The dihydride ion is produced the least of the three.

== Related radicals ==
HMgO and HMgS have been theoretically investigated. MgOH and MgSH are lower in energy.

== Applications ==
The spectrum of MgH in stars can be used to measure the isotope ratio of magnesium, the temperature, and gravity of the surface of the star. In hot stars MgH will be mostly disassociated due to the heat breaking the molecules, but it can be detected in cooler G, K and M type stars. It can also be detected in starspots or sunspots. The MgH spectrum can be used to study the magnetic field and nature of starspots.

Some MgH spectral lines show up prominently in the second solar spectrum, that is the fractional linear polarization. The lines belong to the Q_{1} and Q_{2} branches. The MgH absorption lines are immune to the Hanle effect where polarization is reduced in the presence of magnetic fields, such as near sunspots. These same absorption lines do not suffer from the Zeeman effect either. The reason that the Q branch shows up in this way is because Q branch lines are four times more polarizable, and twice as intense as P and R branch lines. These lines that are more polarizable are also less subject to magnetic field effects.

== Other reading ==
- Guntsch, Arnold (1934). "Uber das Bandenspektrum des Magnesiumhydrids". Zeitschrift für Physik (in German). 87 (5–6): 312–322. Bibcode:1934ZPhy...87..312G. doi:10.1007/bf01333426. ISSN 1434-6001. S2CID 121108292.
- Guntsch, Arnold (1937). "Neue Untersuchungen über das Bandenspektrum des Magnesiumhydrids". Zeitschrift für Physik (in German). 104 (7–8): 584–591. Bibcode:1937ZPhy..104..584G. doi:10.1007/BF01330073. ISSN 1434-6001. S2CID 122298682.
- Gumtsch, Arnold (1935). "Über das ultraviolette Bandenspektrum des Magnesiumhydrids und Magnesiumdeutrids". Zeitschrift für Physik (in German). 93 (7–8): 534–538. Bibcode:1935ZPhy...93..534G. doi:10.1007/bf01330379. ISSN 1434-6001. S2CID 122512562.
- Guntsch, Arnold (1937). "Über einige neue Banden des Magnesiumhydrids". Zeitschrift für Physik (in German). 107 (5–6): 420–424. Bibcode:1937ZPhy..107..420G. doi:10.1007/bf01330185. ISSN 1434-6001. S2CID 121467969.
- Balfour, Walter J.; Cartwright, Hugh M. (1975). "Low-lying electronic states of magnesium hydride". Chemical Physics Letters. 32 (1): 82–85. Bibcode:1975CPL....32...82B. doi:10.1016/0009-2614(75)85173-6. ISSN 0009-2614.
- Balfour, Walter J.; Cartwright, Hugh M. (1976). "TheB′2Σ+ → X2Σ+systems of MgH and MgD". Canadian Journal of Physics. 54 (18): 1898–1904. Bibcode:1976CaJPh..54.1898B. doi:10.1139/p76-229. ISSN 0008-4204.
- Chan, Arthur C. H.; Davidson, Ernest R. (1970). "Theoretical Study of the MgH Molecule". The Journal of Chemical Physics. 52 (8): 4108. Bibcode:1970JChPh..52.4108C. doi:10.1063/1.1673619. ISSN 0021-9606.
- Sink, M.L.; Bandrauk, A.D.; Henneker, W.H.; Lefebvre-Brion, H.; Raseev, G. (1976). "Theoretical study of the low-lying electronic states of MgH". Chemical Physics Letters. 39 (3): 505–510. Bibcode:1976CPL....39..505S. doi:10.1016/0009-2614(76)80316-8. ISSN 0009-2614.
- Main, Roger P.; Carlson, Donald J.; DuPuis, Richard A. (1967). "Measurement of oscillator strengths of the MgO(B1Σ+ - X1Σ+) and MgH(A2π - X2Σ+) band systems". Journal of Quantitative Spectroscopy and Radiative Transfer. 7 (5): 805–811. Bibcode:1967JQSRT...7..805M. doi:10.1016/0022-4073(67)90036-2. ISSN 0022-4073.
- Lambert, D. L.; Mallia, E. A.; Petford, A. D. (1971). "Magnesium Hydride in the Sun". Monthly Notices of the Royal Astronomical Society. 154 (3): 265–278. Bibcode:1971MNRAS.154..265L. doi:10.1093/mnras/154.3.265.
- Boyer, R. (1971). "Isotopic Lines of the MgH Molecule". Astronomy and Astrophysics. 12: 464. Bibcode:1971A&A....12..464B.
- Olga Yurchenko. "ExoMol Bibliography for MgH".
- "Isotopologues of MgH". ExoMol.
