= WASP-79 =

Star in the constellation Eridanus

Observation data Epoch J2000 Equinox ICRS
- Constellation: Eridanus
- Right ascension: 04^{h} 25^{m} 29.01666^{s}
- Declination: −30° 36′ 01.6107″
- Apparent magnitude (V): 10.04

Characteristics
- Evolutionary stage: main sequence
- Spectral type: F5

Astrometry
Radial velocity (R_{v})	+5.39±0.27 km/s
Proper motion (μ)	RA: −0.222 mas/yr Dec.: +2.615 mas/yr
Parallax (π)	4.0708±0.0149 mas
Distance	801 ± 3 ly (245.7 ± 0.9 pc)

Details
Mass	1.26±0.10 M_{☉}
Radius	1.73±0.02 R_{☉}
Luminosity	4.43±0.03 L_{☉}
Surface gravity (log g)	4.06±0.03 cgs
Temperature	6365±41 K
Metallicity [Fe/H]	+0.03±0.10 dex
Rotational velocity (v sin i)	21.5±0.7 km/s
Age	1.4±0.3 Gyr

Other designations
- Montuno, CD−30 1812, SAO 195000, TOI-413, TIC 170634116, WASP-79, TYC 7038-834-1

Database references
SIMBAD	data
Exoplanet Archive	data

WASP-79, also named Montuno, is an F-type main-sequence star about 801 light-years (246 parsecs) away in the constellation Eridanus. With an apparent magnitude of 10, it is much too faint to be visible to the naked eye. With 1.26 M_{☉} and 1.73 R_{☉}, it is both larger and more massive than the Sun. Its effective temperature is 6,365 K, making it hotter than the Sun. It hosts one known exoplanet, WASP-79b.

== Nomenclature ==
The designation WASP-79 comes from the Wide Angle Search for Planets; other designations include CD−30 1812 from the Durchmusterung catalog.

This was one of the systems selected to be named in the 2019 NameExoWorlds campaign during the 100th anniversary of the IAU, which assigned each country a star and planet to be named. This system was assigned to Panama. The approved names were Montuno for the star and Pollera for the planet, after the traditional costumes worn by a man and woman in the Panamanian folk dance El Punto.

== Planetary system ==
The planet WASP-79b, later named Pollera, is a large, low-density hot Jupiter, discovered in 2012 by the Wide Angle Search for Planets using the transit method. It has a nearly polar orbit. Observations by the Hubble Space Telescope have been used to characterize its atmosphere, detecting molecules such as water vapor and measuring its temperature.

The WASP-79 planetary system
Companion (in order from star)	Mass	Semimajor axis (AU)	Orbital period (days)	Eccentricity	Inclination (°)	Radius
b / Pollera	0.835±0.077 M_{J}	0.05014+0.00035 −0.00034	3.66239094(60)	<0.066	85.52±0.1	1.5795±0.0048 R_{J}
