= Chromium hydride =

Compound of chromium and hydrogen

Chromium hydrides are compounds of chromium and hydrogen, and possibly other elements. Intermetallic compounds with not-quite-stoichometric quantities of hydrogen exist, as well as highly reactive molecules. When present at low concentrations, hydrogen and certain other elements alloyed with chromium act as softening agents that enables the movement of dislocations that otherwise not occur in the crystal lattices of chromium atoms.

The hydrogen in typical chromium hydride alloys may contribute only a few hundred parts per million in weight at ambient temperatures. Varying the amount of hydrogen and other alloying elements, and their form in the chromium hydride either as solute elements, or as precipitated phases, expedites the movement of dislocations in chromium, and thus controls qualities such as the hardness, ductility, and tensile strength of the resulting chromium hydride.

== Material properties ==
Even in the narrow range of concentrations that make up chromium hydride, mixtures of hydrogen and chromium can form a number of different structures, with very different properties. Understanding such properties is essential to making quality chromium hydride. At room temperature, the most stable form of pure chromium is the body-centered cubic (BCC) structure α-chromium. It is a fairly hard metal that can dissolve only a small concentration of hydrogen.

It can occur as a dull brown or dark grey solid in two different crystalline forms: face-centered cubic with formula CrH_{~2} or a close packed hexagonal solid with formula CrH_{~1}. Chromium hydride is important in chrome plating, being an intermediate in the formation of the chromium plate.

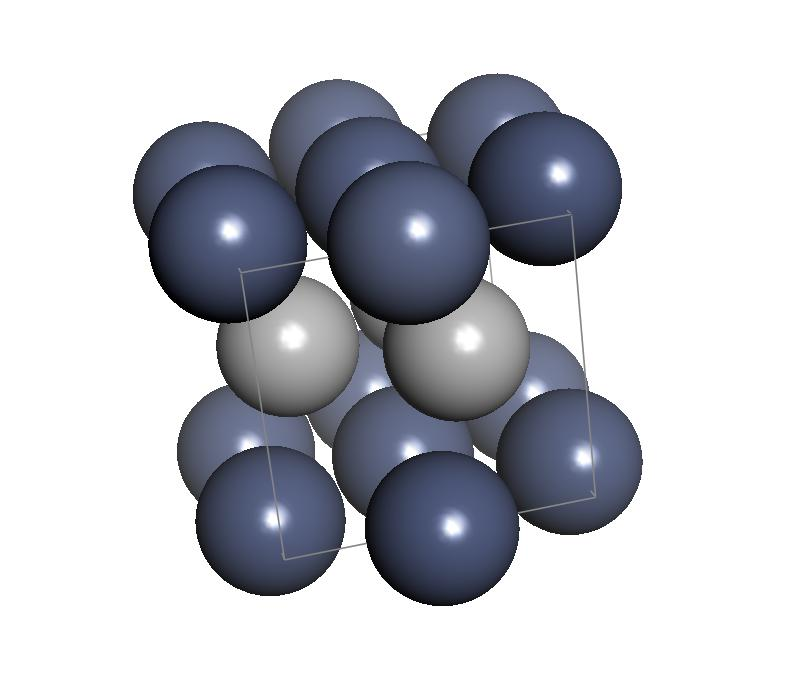
Unit cell of hexagonal close packed form of chromium hydride

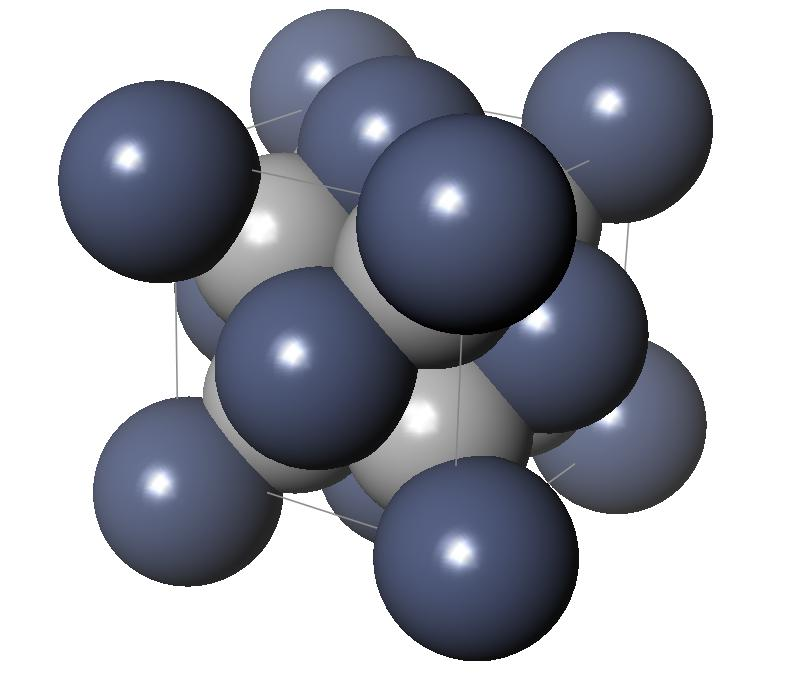
Unit cell of face-centered cubic CrH_{2}

An apparent unusual allotrope of chromium in a hexagonal crystal form was investigated by Ollard and Bradley by X-ray crystallography; however they failed to notice that it contained hydrogen. The hexagonal close packed crystalline substance they discovered actually contains CrH_{x} with x between 0.5 and 1. The lattice for the hexagonal form had unit cell dimensions a=0.271 nm and c=0.441 nm. The crystal form has been described as anti-NiAs structure and is known as the β-phase. Also known as ε-CrH, the space group is Fm3̅m with hydrogen only in octahedral sites.

A face-centered cubic (fcc) phase of chromium hydride can also be produced when chromium is electrodeposited. Cloyd A. Snavely used chromate in sugar syrup cooled to about 5 °C and with a current density of 1290 amperes per square meter. The unit cell dimension in the material was 0.386 nm. The material is brittle and easily decomposed by heat. The composition is CrH_{x}, with x between 1 and 2. For current density above 1800 amps per square meter and at low temperatures, the hexagonal close-packed form was made, but if the current was lower or the temperature was higher, then regular body-centered cubic chromium metal was deposited. The condition for preferring the formation of face-centered cubic chromium hydride is a high pH. The fcc form of CrH has hydrogen atoms in octahedral sites in the P6_{3}/mmc spacegroup.

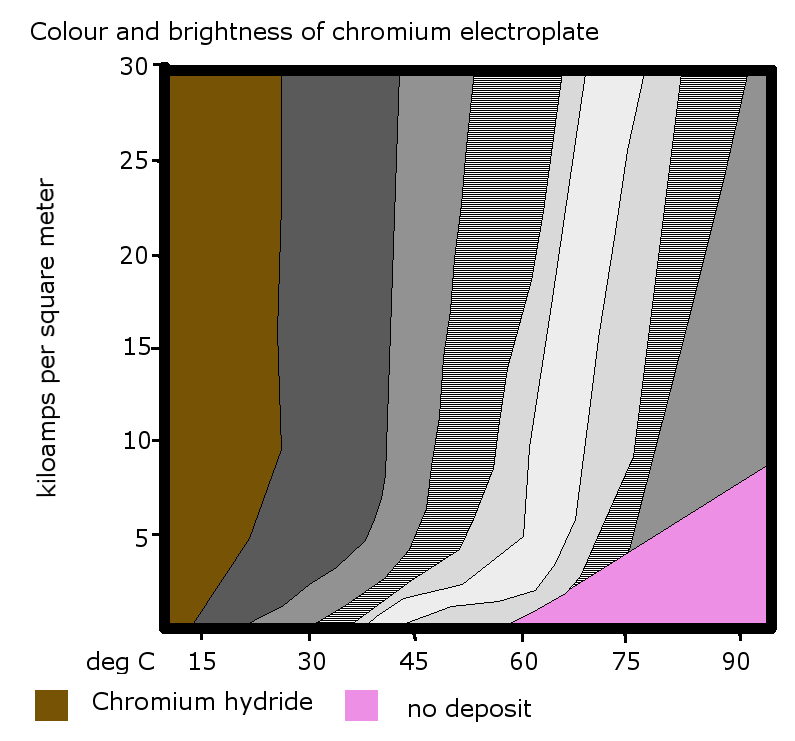
Chart of effect of temperature and current density on chromium plate brightness. Brown and dark grey are the conditions for chromium hydride formation; pink is the area of no plating.

Face-centered cubic CrH had the composition CrH_{1.7}. But in theory it would be CrH_{2} if the substance was pure and all the tetrahedral sites were occupied by hydrogen atoms. The solid substance CrH_{2} appears as a dull grey or brown colour. Its surface is easily scratched, but that is due to the brittleness of the hydride.

Face-centered cubic chromium hydride also forms temporarily when chromium metal is etched with hydrochloric acid.

The hexagonal form spontaneously changes to normal chromium in 40 days, whereas the other form (face-centered cubic) changes to the body-centered cubic form of chromium in 230 days at room temperature. Ollard already noticed that hydrogen is evolved during this transformation, but was not sure that the hydrogen was an essential component of the substance, as electrodeposited chromium usually contained hydrogen. Colin G Fink observed that if the hexagonal form was heated in a flame that the hydrogen would quickly burn off.

Electroplating chromium metal from a chromate solution involves the formation of chromium hydride. If the temperature is high enough the chromium hydride rapidly decomposes as it forms, yielding microcrystalline body-centered cubic chromium. Therefore, to ensure that the hydride decomposes sufficiently rapidly and smoothly, chromium must be plated at a suitably high temperature (roughly 60C to 75C, depending on conditions). As the hydride decomposes, the plated surface cracks. The cracking can be controlled and there may be up to 40 cracks per millimeter. Substances on the plating surface, mostly chromium sesquioxide, are sucked into the cracks as they form. The cracks heal over and newer electroplated layers will crack differently. When observed with a microscope the electroplated chromium will appear to be in the form of crystals with 120° and 60° angles, but these are the ghosts of the original hydride crystals; the actual crystals that finally form in the coating are much smaller and consist of body centered cubic chromium.

Superhexagonal chromium hydride has also been produced by exposing chromium films to hydrogen under high pressure and temperature.

In 1926 T. Weichselfelder and B. Thiede claimed to have prepared solid chromium trihydride by reacting hydrogen with chromium chloride and phenylmagnesium bromide in ether, forming a black precipitate.

Solid hexagonal CrH can burn in air with a bluish flame. It is ignitable with a burning match.

== Related alloys ==
The hydrogen content of chromium hydride is between zero and a few hundred parts per million in weight for plain chromium-hydrogen alloys. These values vary depending on alloying elements, such as iron, manganese, vanadium, titanium and so on.

Alloys with significantly higher than a few hundred parts per million hydrogen content can be formed, but require extraordinarily high pressures to be stable. Under such conditions, the hydrogen content may contribute up to 0.96% of its weight, at which point it reaches what is called a line compound phase boundary. As the hydrogen content moves beyond the line compound boundary, the chromium-hydrogen system ceases to behave as an alloy, and instead forms a series of non-metallic stoichiometric compounds, each succeeding one requiring still higher pressure for stability. The first such compound found is dichromium hydride (Cr_{2}H), where the chromium-to-hydrogen ratio is 1/0.5, corresponding to a hydrogen content of 0.96%. Two of these compounds are metastable at ambient pressures, meaning that they decompose over extended lengths of time, rather than instantaneously so. The other such compound is Chromium(I) hydride which is several times more stable. Both these compounds are stable at cryogenic temperatures, persisting indefinitely. Although precise details are not known.-

Other materials are often added to the chromium/hydrogen mixture to produce chromium hydride alloy with desired properties. Titanium in chromium hydride make the β-chromium form of the chromium-hydrogen solution more stable.
