= Magnesium iron hexahydride =

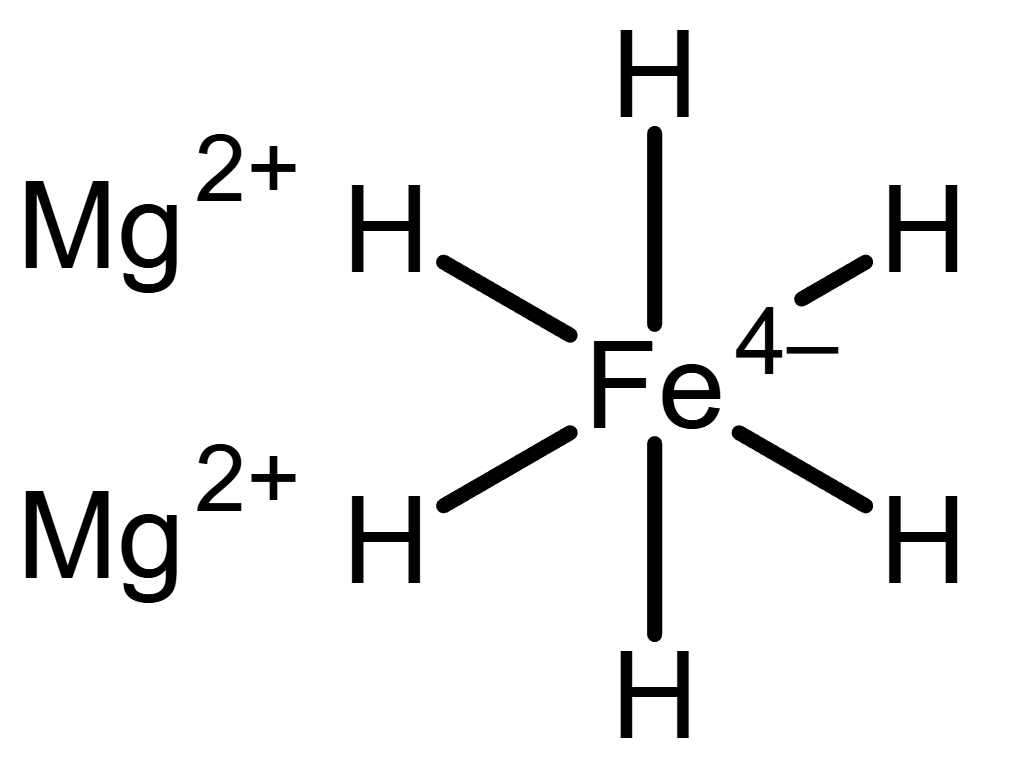

Names
- Other names: Dimagnesium iron hexahydride; Magnesium hexahydroferrate(II); Magnesium hexahydridoferrate(II)

Identifiers
CAS Number	89959-23-9
3D model (JSmol)	Interactive image
- InChI: InChI=1S/Fe.2Mg.6H/q3*+2;6*-1 Key: VJOPJGZJJZUMMB-UHFFFAOYSA-N
- SMILES: [Mg+2].[Mg+2].[FeH6-4]

Properties
Chemical formula	FeH_{6}Mg_{2}
Molar mass	110.503 g·mol^{−1}
Appearance	green solid
Density	2.74 g/cm^{3}
- Except where otherwise noted, data are given for materials in their standard state (at 25 °C [77 °F], 100 kPa). Infobox references

Magnesium iron hexahydride is an inorganic compound with the formula Mg_{2}FeH_{6}. It is a green diamagnetic solid that is stable in dry air. The material is prepared by heating a mixture of powdered magnesium and iron under high pressures of hydrogen:

2 Mg + Fe + 3 H_{2} → Mg_{2}FeH_{6}

== Structure ==
Interaction between one (of four) MgBr(thf)_{2}^{+} centers and FeH_{6}^{4-}.

The compound is isomorphous with K_{2}PtCl_{6}, i.e., their connectivities and structures are the same. The [FeH_{6}]^{4−} centre adopts octahedral molecular geometry with Fe-H distances of 1.56 Å. The Mg^{2+} centres are bound to the faces of the octahedron, with Mg-H distances of 2.38 Å. Several related compounds are known including salts of [RuH_{6}]^{4−}, [OsH_{6}]^{4−}, and [PtH_{6}]^{2−} anions.

== Soluble derivatives ==
Although Mg_{2}FeH_{6} is not soluble in ordinary solvents, related derivatives are. For example, the related salt Mg_{4}Br_{4}(THF)_{4}FeH_{6} is soluble as are related alkoxides. Measurements on such compounds suggest that the hydride ligand exerts a weaker crystal field than cyanide.
