= Calcium monohydride =

- Calcium monohydride

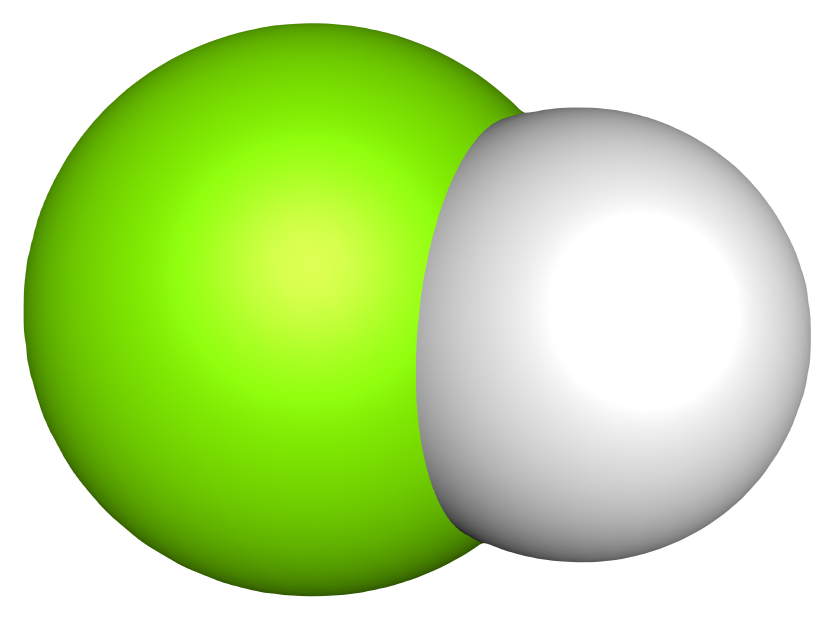

Names
- IUPAC name Calcium monohydride
- Other names Calcium(I) hydride

Identifiers
CAS Number	14452-75-6
3D model (JSmol)	Interactive image
ChemSpider	26667671
PubChem CID	5462806
- InChI: InChI=1S/Ca.2H/q+1;;-1 Key: CHYDSHXOJGDCRJ-UHFFFAOYSA-N; InChI=1S/Ca.H Key: PKHCKQOIOXDRJH-UHFFFAOYSA-N
- SMILES: [H].[Ca]

Properties
Chemical formula	CaH
Molar mass	41.085899 g/mol
Appearance	glowing red gas
Solubility in water	reacts violently

Related compounds
Other cations	Beryllium monohydride, Magnesium monohydride, Strontium monohydride, Barium monohydride, Potassium hydride
Related calcium hydrides	Calcium hydride
- Except where otherwise noted, data are given for materials in their standard state (at 25 °C [77 °F], 100 kPa). Infobox references

Calcium monohydride is a molecule composed of calcium and hydrogen with formula CaH. It can be found in stars as a gas formed when calcium atoms are present with hydrogen atoms.

== Discovery ==
Calcium monohydride was first discovered when its spectrum was observed in Alpha Herculis and ο Ceti by Alfred Fowler in 1907. It was observed in sunspots the following year by C. M. Olmsted. Next, it was made in a laboratory in 1909 by A. Eagle, and with early research by Hulthèn, and Watson and Weber in 1935. It was further observed in red dwarfs by Y. Öhman in 1934. Öhman proposed its use as a proxy for stellar luminosity, similar to magnesium monohydride (MgH), in being more apparent in the spectra of compact, cool, high surface gravity stars such as M dwarfs than in cool, low surface gravity stars such as M giants of non-negligible, or even comparable, metallicity.

Calcium monohydride is the first molecular gas that was cooled by a cold buffer gas and then trapped by a magnetic field. This extends the study of trapped cold atoms such as rubidium to molecules.

== Formation ==
Calcium monohydride can be formed by exposing metallic calcium to an electric discharge in a hydrogen atmosphere above 750 °C. Below this temperature the hydrogen is absorbed to form calcium hydride.

Calcium monohydride can be formed by laser ablation of calcium dihydride in a helium atmosphere.

Gaseous calcium reacts with formaldehyde at temperatures around 1200 K to make CaH as well as some CaOH and CaO. This reaction glows orange-red.

== Properties ==
The dipole moment of the CaH molecule is 2.94 debye. Spectrographic constants have been measured as bond length R_{e}=2.0025 Å dissociation energy D_{e}=1.837 eV and harmonic vibrational frequency ω_{e}=1298.34 cm^{−1}. Ionisation potential is 5.8 eV. Electron affinity is 0.9 eV.

The ground state is X^{2}Σ^{+}.

The electronic states are:

- 6σ^{2}7σ X^{2}Σ^{+}
- 6σ^{2}3π A^{2}Π
- 6σ^{2}8σ B^{2}Σ^{+}
- 6σ^{2}4π E^{2}Π
- 6σ7σ^{2} D^{2}Σ^{+}

=== Spectrum ===
B^{2}Σ, with ν'=0 ← X^{2}Σ with ν"=0 634 nm (or is it 690 nm?) CaH fluoresces with 634 nm light giving 690 nm emissions.

B^{2}Σ^{+} ← X^{2}Σ^{+} 585.8 nm to 590.2 nm.

A^{+2}Π ← X^{2}Σ^{+} 686.2 to 697.8 nm

R12 branch

J'	J"	N"	ν	nm	THz
3/2	1/2	0	14408.94	694.0135	431.9691
5/2	3/2	1	14421.12	693.4274	432.3343
7/2	5/2	2	14432.92	692.8605	432.6881
9/2	7/2	3	14444.54	692.3031	433.0364
11/2	9/2	4	14455.76	691.7658	433.3728
13/2	11/2	5	14467.20	691.2188	433.71574

R2 branch

J'	J"	N"	ν	nm	THz
3/2	1/2	0	14480.93	690.5633	434.1274
5/2	3/2	1	14495.08	689.8893	434.5516
7/2	5/2	2	14510.09	689.1756	435.0015
9/2	7/2	3	14525.53	688.4430	435.4644
11/2	9/2	4	14541.43	687.6903	435.9411
13/2	11/2	5	14557.98	686.9085	436.4373

C^{2}Σ^{+} →X^{2}Σ^{+} transition is in near ultraviolet.

=== Microwave spectrum ===
The energy required to spin the CaH molecule from its lowest level to the first quantum level corresponds to a microwave frequency, so there is an absorption around 253 GHz. However, the spin of the molecule is also affected by the spin of an unpaired electron on the calcium, and the spin of the proton in the hydrogen. The electron spin leads to splitting of the line by about 1911.7 MHz, and the spin relative to the proton spin results in hyperfine splitting of the line by about 157.3 MHz.

molecule spin quantum number		electron spin quantum number		proton spin quantum number		frequency
N	N'	J	J'	F	F'	kHz
0	1	1/2	1/2	1	1	252163082
0	1	1/2	1/2	1	0	252216347
0	1	1/2	1/2	0	1	252320467
0	1	1/2	3/2	1	1	254074834
0	1	1/2	3/2	1	2	254176415
0	1	1/2	3/2	0	1	254232179

== Reactions ==
CaH reacts with lithium as a cold gas releasing 0.9eV of energy and forming LiH molecules and calcium atoms.

== Extra reading ==
- Calvin, Aaron T.; Janardan, Smitha; Condoluci, John; Rugango, Réne; Pretzsch, Eric; Shu, Gang; Brown, Kenneth R. (16 March 2018). "Rovibronic Spectroscopy of Sympathetically Cooled40CaH". The Journal of Physical Chemistry A. 122 (12): 3177–3181. Bibcode:2018JPCA..122.3177C. doi:10.1021/acs.jpca.7b12823. hdl:1853/60241. PMID 29521505.
