= Iron–hydrogen alloy =

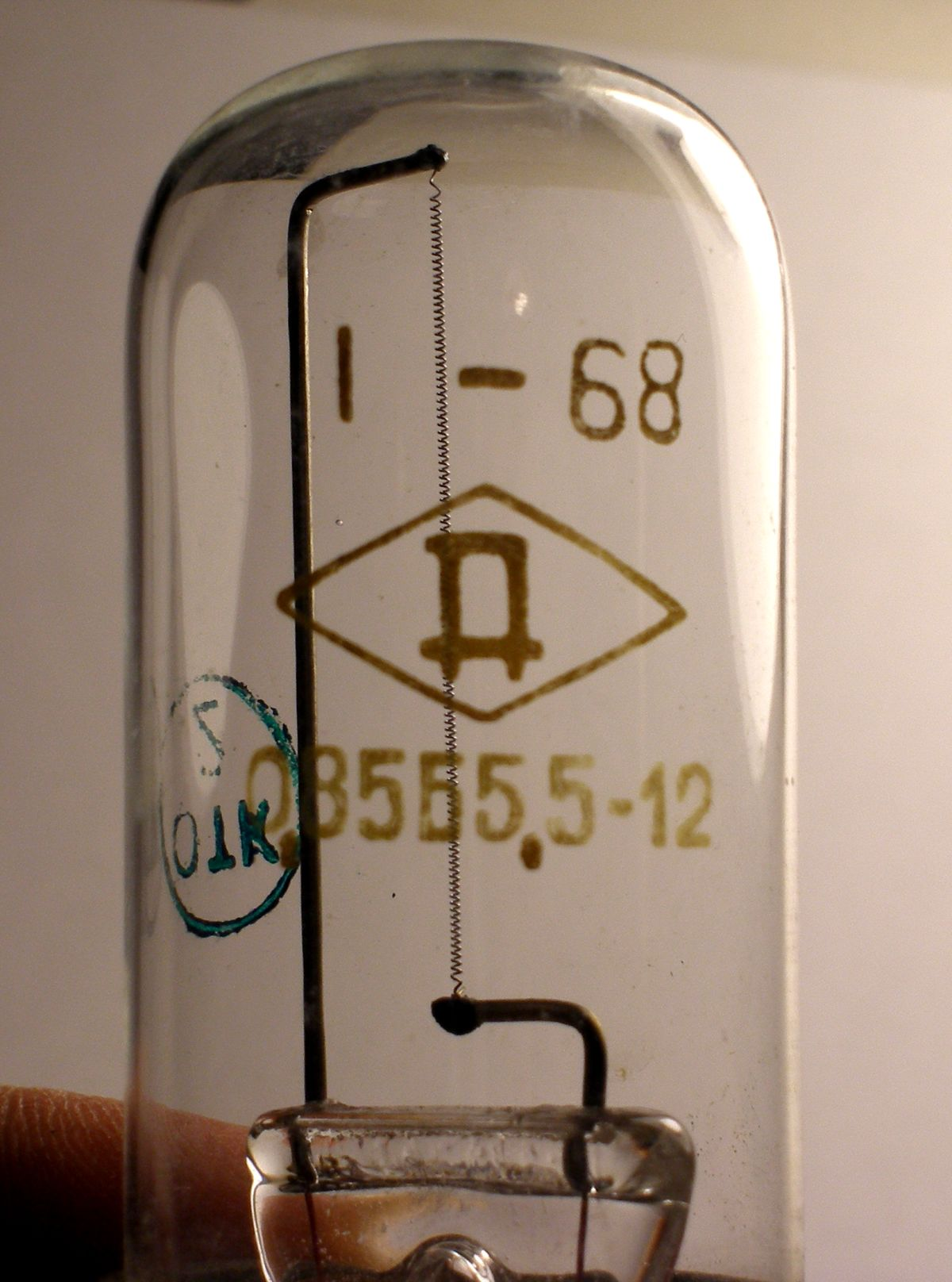
An iron-hydrogen resistor, or 'barretter', containing an iron hydride filament under a hydrogen atmosphere, wherein the temperature-dependent hydrogen solubility controls resistance.

Iron–hydrogen alloy, also known as iron hydride, is an alloy of iron and hydrogen and other elements. Because of its lability when removed from a hydrogen atmosphere, it has no uses as a structural material.

Iron is able to take on two crystalline forms (allotropic forms), body centered cubic (BCC) and face centered cubic (FCC), depending on its temperature. In the body-centred cubic arrangement, there is an iron atom in the centre of each cube, and in the face-centred cubic, there is one at the center of each of the six faces of the cube. It is the interaction of the allotropes of iron with the alloying elements that gives iron-hydrogen alloy its range of unique properties.

In pure iron, the crystal structure has relatively little resistance to the iron atoms slipping past one another, and so pure iron is quite ductile, or soft and easily formed. In iron hydride, small amounts of hydrogen within the iron act as a softening agent that promote the movement of dislocations that are common in the crystal lattices of iron atoms. Other elements and inclusions act as hardening agents that prevent the movement of dislocations.

The hydrogen in typical iron hydrides may contribute up to 13 ppm in its weight. Varying the amount of hydrogen, as well as controlling its chemical and physical makeup in the final iron hydride (either as a solute element, or as a precipitated phase), hastens the movement of those dislocations that make pure iron ductile, and thus controls and undermines its qualities. Varying the other alloying elements and controlling their chemical and physical makeup also controls, but enhances its qualities. These qualities include such things as the hardness, quenching behaviour, need for annealing, tempering behaviour, yield strength, and tensile strength of the resulting iron-hydrogen alloy. The retention of iron hydride's strength compared to pure iron is possible only by maintaining iron's ductility.

At ordinary pressure, iron can incorporate a small amount of hydrogen into its crystal structure, and at extreme temperatures and pressures, such as might be found in the Earth's core, larger amounts of hydrogen can be incorporated. These substances are the subject of study in industrial metallurgy and planetary geology.

== Material properties ==
Iron is commonly found in the Earth's crust in the form of an ore, usually an iron oxide, such as magnetite, hematite, etc. Iron is smelted from iron ore by a number of chemical processes. One such process, known as hydrogen roasting, is more commonly applied to metals such as tungsten and molybdenum, but can be used to produce iron-hydrogen alloys.

In the narrow range of mixtures of hydrogen and iron that make an iron hydride at atmospheric pressure, a small number of different metallurgical structures with different properties can form. At room temperature, the most stable form of pure iron is the body-centred cubic (BCC) structure called alpha-iron or α-iron. It is a fairly soft metal that can dissolve only a very small concentration of hydrogen, no more than 2 ppm at 25 °C (77 °F) and 3.6 ppm at 912 °C (1,674 °F). The inclusion of hydrogen in alpha iron is called ferritic iron hydride. At 910 °C (1,670 °F) pure iron transforms into a face-centred cubic (FCC) structure, called gamma-iron or γ-iron. The inclusion of hydrogen in gamma iron is called austenitic iron hydride. The more open FCC structure of austenitic iron can dissolve somewhat more hydrogen, as much as 9.0 ppm hydrogen at 1,394 °C (2,541 °F). At this temperature iron transforms into another BCC structure called delta-iron or δ-iron. It can dissolve even more hydrogen, as much as 13 ppm hydrogen at 1,538 °C (2,800 °F), which reflects the upper hydrogen content of iron hydride. When hydrogen moves out of solution with iron it reverts to elemental hydrogen (H_{2}).

When iron hydrides with more than 2 ppm hydrogen are cooled, the hydrogen no longer fits within the crystalline structures, resulting in an excess of hydrogen. The way for hydrogen to leave the crystalline phases is for it to precipitate out of solution as elemental hydrogen, leaving behind a surrounding phase of BCC iron called ferrite with a small proportion of hydrogen in solution. In a supersaturated composition (greater than 2 ppm hydrogen), the hydrogen will precipitate out as large inclusions of elemental hydrogen at the grain boundaries until the proportion of hydrogen in the grains has decreased to the saturated composition (2 ppm). The above assumes that the cooling process is very slow, allowing enough time for the hydrogen to migrate. As the rate of cooling is increased, the hydrogen will have less time to migrate to form elemental hydrogen at the grain boundaries; hence the elemental hydrogen is more widely dispersed and acts to prevent slip of defects within those grains, resulting in hardening of the iron hydride. At the very high cooling rates produced by quenching, the hydrogen has no time to migrate but is locked within the crystalline structure and forms martensic iron hydride. Martensic iron hydride is a highly strained and stressed, supersaturated form of hydrogen and iron and is exceedingly hard but brittle.

=== Heat treatment ===
There are many types of heat treating processes available to iron-hydride alloy. The most common are annealing, quenching, and tempering. Heat treatment is effective on compositions above the saturated composition of 2 ppm hydrogen, aiding to prevent hydrogen embrittlement. Non-saturated iron hydride does not benefit from heat treatment.

Annealing is the process of heating the iron-hydrogen alloy to a sufficiently high temperature to relieve local internal stresses. It does not create a general softening of the product but only locally relieves strains and stresses locked up within the material. Annealing goes through three phases: recovery, recrystallisation, and grain growth. The temperature required to anneal a particular iron hydride depends on the type of annealing to be achieved and the alloying constituents.

Quenching involves heating the iron-hydrogen alloy to create a different phase then quenching it in water or oil. This rapid cooling results in a hard but brittle martensitic structure. The iron-hydrogen alloy is then tempered, which is just a specialised type of annealing, to reduce brittleness. In this application the annealing (tempering) process transforms some of the dissolved hydrogen into elemental hydrogen and hence it reduces the internal stresses and defects. The result is a more ductile and fracture-resistant iron-hydrogen alloy.

== High pressure properties ==
The common form of iron is the “α” form, with body centred cubic (BCC) crystalline structure; in the absence of reactive chemicals, at ambient temperature and 13 GPa of pressure it converts to the “ε” form, with hexagonal close packing (HCP) structure. In an atmosphere of hydrogen at ambient temperature, α-Fe retains its structure up to 3.5 GPa (35,000 atmospheres), with only small amounts of hydrogen diffusing into it forming a solid interstitial solution.

Starting at about 3.5 GPa of pressure, hydrogen H_{2} rapidly diffuses into metallic iron (with diffusion length of about 500 mm per 10 s at 5 GPa) to form a crystalline solid with formula close to FeH. This reaction, in which the iron expands significantly, was first inferred from the unexpected deformation of steel gaskets in diamond anvil cell experiments. In 1991 J. V. Badding and others analysed a sample using X-ray diffraction, as having an approximate composition FeH_{0.94} and double hexagonal close packed (DHCP) structure.

Since then, the pressure-temperature phase diagram of the iron-hydrogen system has been intensively investigated up to 70 GPa. Two additional stable crystalline forms have been observed, denoted “ε’” (the original DHCP form), “ε” (hexagonal close packed, HPC). In these phases the packing of iron atoms is less dense than in pure iron. The HCP and FCC forms have the same iron lattice as in the pure iron forms, but have different number of hydrogen neighbors, and have different local magnetic moments. The hydrogen and iron atoms are electrically neutral for the bcc form.

At low temperatures the stable forms are BCC below 5 GPa and ε’ (DHCP) above 5 GPa at least up to 80 GPa; at higher temperatures γ (FCC) exists at least up to 20 GPa. The triple point ε'-γ-melt is predicted to be at 60 GPa and 2000 K. Theoretical calculations however predict that, at 300 K, the stable structures should be DHCP below 37 GPa, HCP between 37–83 GPa, and FCC above 83 GPa.

Other hydrogenated forms FeH_{x} with x = 0.25 (Fe_{4}H), x = 0.50 (Fe_{2}H), and x = 0.75 (Fe_{4}H_{3}) have been the subject of theoretical studies. These compounds dissociate spontaneously at ordinary pressures, but at very low temperatures they will survive long enough in a metastable state to be studied. At ordinary temperatures, rapid depressurization of FeH from 7.5 GPa (at 1.5 GPa/s) results in metallic iron containing many small hydrogen bubbles; with slow depressurization the hydrogen diffuses out of the metal. High pressure stability of different iron hydrides was systematically studied using density-functional calculations and evolutionary crystal structure prediction by Bazhanova et al., who found that at pressures and temperatures of the Earth's inner core only FeH, FeH_{3} and an unexpected compound FeH_{4} are thermodynamically stable, whereas FeH_{2} is not.

=== ε’ (DHCP) form ===
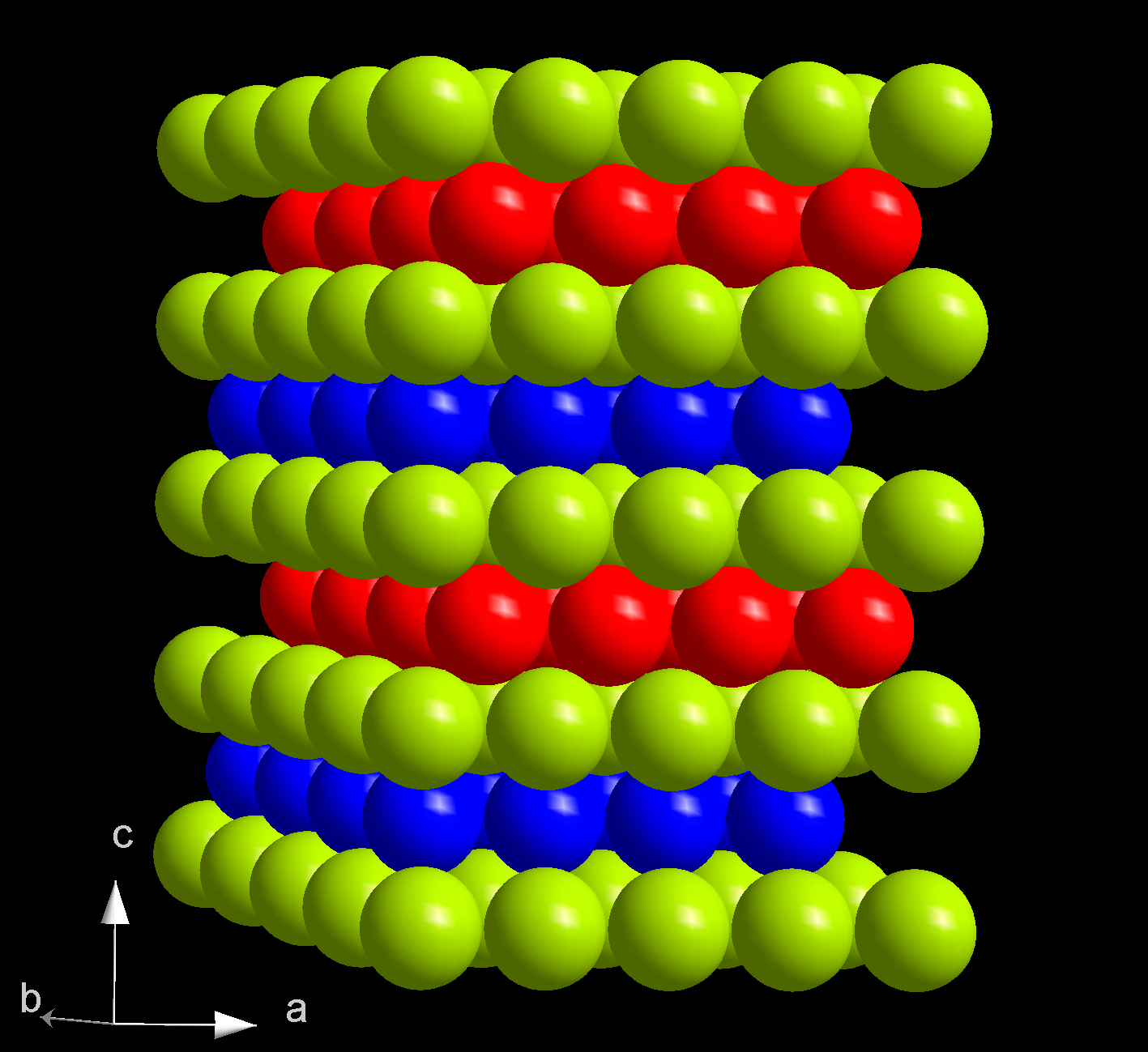
The double hexagonal close packed (dhcp) structure with ABAC alignment of FeH. Each sphere is an iron atom. Hydrogen are located in the interstices.

The best-known high-pressure phase in the iron-hydrogen system (characterized by V. E. Antonov and others, 1989) has a double hexagonal close packed (DHCP) structure. It consists of layers of hexagonal packed iron atoms, offset in a pattern ABAC; which means that even-numbered layers are vertically aligned, while the odd-numbered ones alternate between the two possible relative alignments. The c axis of the unit cell is 0.87 nm. Hydrogen atoms occupy octahedral cavities between the layers. The hydrogen layers come in vertically aligned pairs, bracketing the B and C layers and shifted like them. For each hydrogen added the unit cell expands by 1.8 Å^{3} (0.0018 nm^{3}). This phase was denoted ε’, after the similar structure that iron assumes above 14 GPa.

This phase is rapidly created at room temperature and 3.8 GPa from hydrogen and α-iron. The transformation entails an expansion by 17–20% in volume. The reaction is complex and may involve a metastable HCP intermediate form; at 9 GPa and 350 °C there are still noticeable amounts of unreacted α-Fe in the solid. The same form is obtained from by reacting hydrogen with the higher-pressure HCP form of iron (ε-Fe) at 1073 K and 20 GPa for 20 min; and also from α-iron and H_{2}O at 84 GPa and 1300 K.

This phase is stable at room temperature at least up to 80 GPa, but turns into the γ form between 1073 and 1173 K and 20 GPa.

This material has metallic appearance and is an electrical conductor. Its resistivity is higher than that of iron, and decreases down to a minimum at 8 GPa. Above 13 GPa the resistivity increases with pressure. The material is ferromagnetic at the lowest pressure range, but the ferromagnetism begins to decrease at 20 GPa and disappears at 32 GPa t.

The bulk elasticity modulus of this compound is 121 ± 19 GPa, substantially lower than iron's 160 GPa. This difference means that at 3.5 GPa FeH has 51% less volume than the mixture of hydrogen and iron that forms it.

The speed of compressional sound waves in FeH rises as pressure rises, at 10 GPa it is at 6.3 km/s, at 40 GPa 8.3 km/s and 70 GPa 9 km/s.

The DHCP form of iron hydride can be preserved in a metastable form at ambient pressures by first lowering the temperature below 100 K.

=== ε (HCP) form ===
A hexagonal close packed (HCP) form of FeH also exists at lower pressure hydrogen, also described by M. Yamakata and others in 1992. This is called the ε phase (no prime). The hcp phase is not ferromagnetic, probably paramagnetic. This appears to be the most stable form in a wide pressure range. It seems to have a composition between FeH_{0.42}.

The hcp form of FeH can be preserved in a metastable form at ambient pressures by first lowering the temperature below 100 K.

=== Melting point ===
These high pressure iron-hydrogen alloys melt at a significantly lower temperature than pure iron:

Pressure (GPa)	7.5	10	11.5	15	18	20
Melting point (°C)	1150	1473	1448	1538	1548	1585

The slope of the melting point curve with pressure (dT/dP) is 13 K/GPa.

== Occurrence in the Earth’s core ==
Very little is known about the composition of Earth's inner core. The only parameters that are known with confidence are the speed of the pressure and shear sound waves (the existence of the latter implying that it is a solid). The pressure at the boundary between the inner core and the liquid outer core is estimated at 330 GPa, still somewhat beyond the range of laboratory experiments. The density of the outer and inner cores can only be estimated by indirect means. The inner core was at first thought to be 10% less dense than pure iron at the predicted conditions, but this presumed “density deficit” has later been revised downwards: 2 to 5% by some estimates or 1 to 2% by others.

The density deficit is thought to be due to mixture of lighter elements such as silicon or carbon. Hydrogen has been thought unlikely because of its volatility, but recent studies have uncovered plausible mechanisms for its incorporation and permanence in the core. It is estimated that hcp FeH would be stable under those conditions. Iron–hydrogen alloys could have been formed in a reaction of iron with water in magma during the formation of the Earth. Above 5 GPa, iron will split water yielding the hydride and ferrous ions:

3Fe + H_{2}O → 2FeH + FeO

Indeed, Okuchi obtained magnetite and iron hydride by reacting magnesium silicate, magnesium oxide, silica and water with metallic iron in a diamond cell at 2000 C. Okuchi argues that most of the hydrogen accreted to Earth should have dissolved into the primeval magma ocean; and if the pressure at the bottom of the magma was 7.5 GPa or more, then almost all of that hydrogen would have reacted with iron to form the hydride, which then would have sunk to the core where it would be stabilized by the increased pressure. Moreover, it appears that at those pressures iron binds hydrogen in preference to carbon.

Based on density and sound velocity measurements at room temperature and up to 70 GPa, extrapolated to core conditions, Shibazaki and others claim that the presence of 0.23 ± 0.06% hydrogen in weight (that is, a mean atomic composition of FeH_{0.13 ± 0.03}) would explain a 2–5% density deficit. and match the observed speed of pressure and shear sound waves in the solid inner core. A different study predicts 0.08–0.16% (weight) hydrogen in the inner core, while others proposed from 50% to 95% FeH (by mole count) If the core has this much hydrogen it would amount to ten times as much as in the oceans.

The liquid outer core also appears to have density 5–10% lower than iron. Shibazaki and others estimate that it should have a somewhat higher proportion of hydrogen than the inner core, but there is not enough data about molten FeH_{x} for accurate estimates. Narygina and others estimate 0.5–1.0% (weight) of hydrogen in the melt. Similar, but without extrapolations in pressure, theoretical estimates give a narrower range of concentrations 0.4-0.5% (weight), however, this results to too low mean atomic mass of the inner core (43.8-46.5) and hydrogen seems to be less likely than other elements (S, Si, C, O) to be the main light alloying element in the core.

== See also ==
- Iron hydride
- Transition metal hydride
- Intermetallic
- Interstitial compound
- Non-stoichiometric compound
- Metallic hydrogen
- Allotropes of iron
