= Beryllium monohydride =

Identifiers
CAS Number	13597-97-2
3D model (JSmol)	Interactive image
ChemSpider	21865051
CompTox Dashboard (EPA)	DTXSID501029799
- InChI: InChI=1S/Be.H Key: AYBCUKQQDUJLQN-UHFFFAOYSA-N
- SMILES: [BeH]

Properties
Chemical formula	BeH^{•}
Molar mass	10.02012 g mol^{−1}
Appearance	Colourless gas

Thermochemistry
Std molar entropy (S^{⦵}_{298})	176.83 J K^{−1} mol^{−1}
Std enthalpy of formation (Δ_{f}H^{⦵}_{298})	321.20 kJ mol^{−1}

Hazards
- NIOSH (US health exposure limits)
PEL (Permissible)	TWA 0.002 mg/m^{3} C 0.005 mg/m^{3} (30 minutes), with a maximum peak of 0.025 mg/m^{3} (as Be)
REL (Recommended)	Ca C 0.0005 mg/m^{3} (as Be)
IDLH (Immediate danger)	Ca [4 mg/m^{3} (as Be)]
- Except where otherwise noted, data are given for materials in their standard state (at 25 °C [77 °F], 100 kPa). Infobox references

Beryllium monohydride (BeH) is an example of a molecule with a half-bond order according to molecular orbital theory. It is a metastable monoradical species which has only been observed in the gas phase. In beryllium monohydride, beryllium has a valency of one, and hydrogen has a valency of one.

BeH has only 5 electrons and is the simplest open shell neutral molecule, and is therefore extremely important for the benchmarking of ab initio methods. With such a light mass, it is also an important benchmark system for studying the breakdown of the Born–Oppenheimer approximation. Due to its simplicity, BeH is expected to be present in astronomical contexts such as exoplanetary atmospheres, cool stars, and the interstellar medium, but so far has only been found on the Sun. Because of the long lifetime (by nuclear physics standards) of ^{11}Be, ^{11}BeH is the leading candidate for the formation of the first halo nucleonic molecule.

BeH has been studied spectroscopically since 1928 and in over 80 theoretical studies (see for a review).

The bond length is 134.2396(3) pm and the dissociation energy is 17702(200) cm^{−1}.

The dimeric molecule Be_{2}H_{2} has also been observed in an argon matrix at 10 K.
