= Parent hydride =

Molecule made of a main-group element bound to hydrogen

In chemistry, a parent hydride in IUPAC nomenclature refers to a main group compound with the formula AH_{n}, where A is a main group element. The names of parent hydrides end with -ane, analogous with the nomenclature for alkanes. Derivatives of parent hydrides are named by appending prefixes or suffixes to the name of the parent hydride to indicate the substituents that replace the hydrogen atoms.

Parent hydrides are used in both the organic nomenclature, and inorganic nomenclature systems.

Parent hydride names for group 13-17 elements (with standard bond numbers)
13	14	15	16	17
BH_{3}, borane	CH_{4}, methane*	NH_{3}, azane (ammonia)*	OH_{2}, oxidane (water)*	FH, fluorane (hydrogen fluoride)*
AlH_{3}, alumane (aluminum hydride)	SiH_{4}, silane*	PH_{3}, phosphane (phosphine)*	SH_{2}, sulfane (hydrogen sulfide)*	ClH, chlorane (hydrogen chloride)*
GaH_{3}, gallane	GeH_{4}, germane*	AsH_{3}, arsane (arsine)*	SeH_{2}, selane (hydrogen selenide)*	BrH, bromane (hydrogen bromide)*
InH_{3}, indigane	SnH_{4}, stannane*	SbH_{3}, stibane	TeH_{2}, tellane (hydrogen telluride)*	IH, iodane (hydrogen iodide)*
TlH_{3}, thallane	PbH_{4}, plumbane	BiH_{3}, bismuthane	PoH_{2}, polane	AtH, astatane

*extensive body of chemistry

== Reactions and structure ==
Parent hydrides are useful reference compounds, but many are nonexistent or unstable. Group III parent hydrides exist only under extraordinary conditions. Borane dimerizes irreversibly. Gallane and heavier congeners polymerize, sometimes with loss of hydrogen. Plumbane and bismuthane, stibane, indane, thallane are unstable.

== See also ==
- Borderline hydrides
- Hydride
- Preferred IUPAC name
