= Group 13 hydride =

Chemical compound with hydrogen bonded to atoms of the boron group

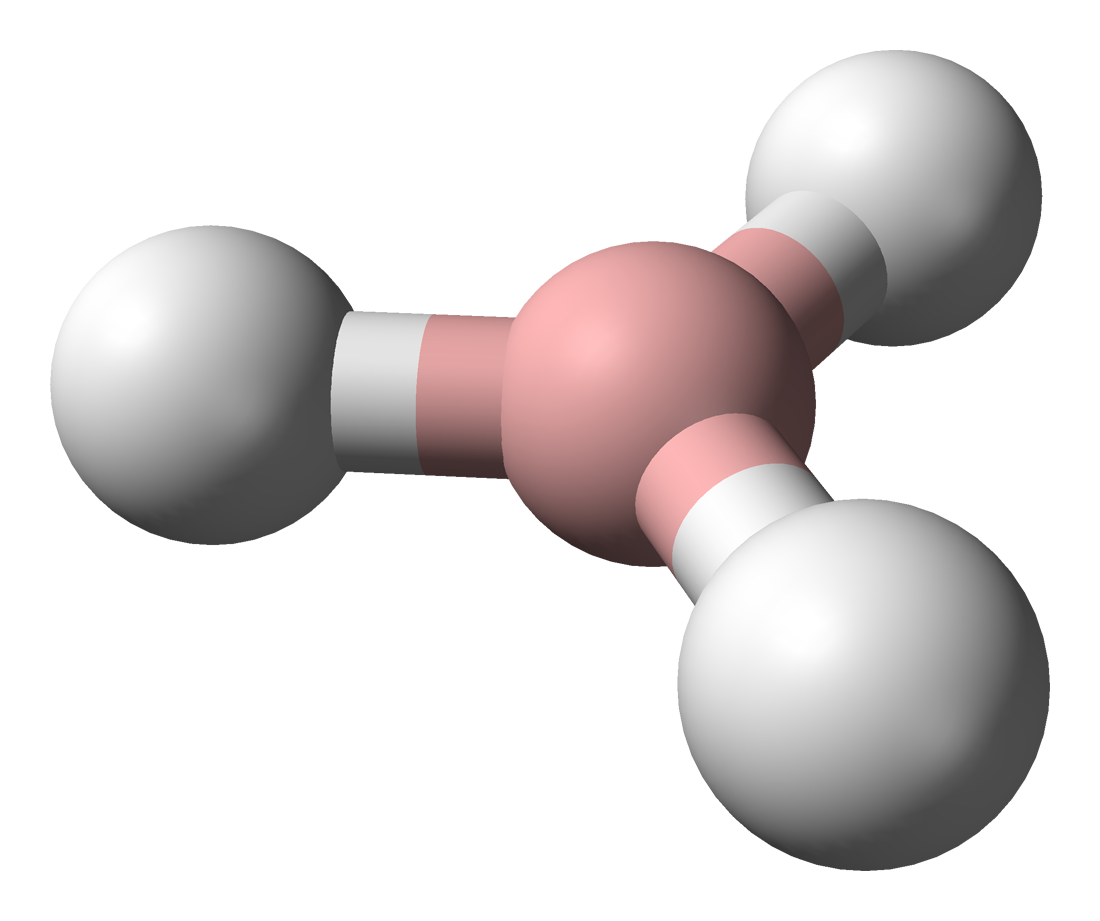
Borane, a simple and elusive group 13 hydride

Group 13 hydrides are chemical compounds with a group 13 element directly bonded to hydrogen. The elements of group 13 are boron, aluminium, gallium, indium, and thallium. This article focuses on parent compounds with the formula EH_{n}^{x}, where x is the charge (zero, negative, or positive).

== Neutral hydrides ==
The mono-, di- and trihydrides of the group 13 elements are mainly of theoretical and pedagogical interest. AlH_{3}, alane, can be isolated as a solid, but all others are difficult to even observe. Neutral hydrides of Ga, In, and Tl spontaneously degrade into the group 13 element and hydrogen gas.

Compound	Chemical formula	Geometry	Comment
Borane	BH_{3}	trigonal planar	fully dimerizes to diborane
Aluminium hydride (alane)	AlH_{3}	polymeric	forms soluble adducts with Lewis bases
Gallane	GaH_{3}	dimer and polymer	decomposes to elements above -30 °C
indium trihydride (indigane)	InH_{3}		rare
thallium trihydride (thallane)	TlH_{3}		rare

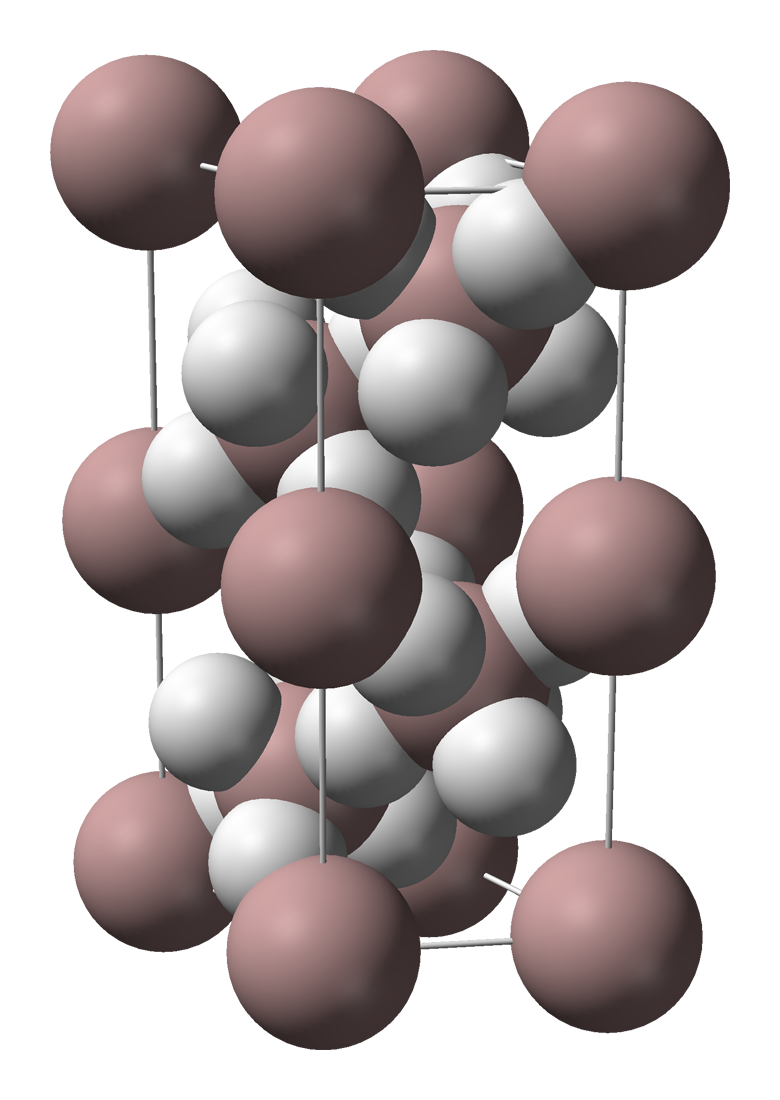
Alane (aluminium trihydride) is a covalent network solid.

== Anions and cations ==
Group 13 tetrahydrides include the anions borohydride (BH_{4}^{−}) and tetrahydroaluminate (AlH_{4}^{−}). The compounds sodium borohydride and lithium aluminium hydride are of some technological significance. Upon heating tetrahydroaluminate eliminates elemental aluminium and some hydrogen, producing the hexahydrides:

3 NaAlH_{4} → Na_{3}AlH_{6} + 2 Al + 3 H_{2}

Cationic binary hydrides are unknown.

== Catenated derivatives ==
For group 13 elements, catenation is often achieved by forming E-H-E linkages (E = group 13 atom). This trend is illustrated by the structures of diborane and digallane. Diborane is a useful reagent in organic chemistry and as a dopant in the semiconductor industry. In general, catenated hydrides of group 13 elements aside from those of boron are of little importance. A great variety of boron hydride clusters are known both as charge-neutral and anionic versions. Examples include B_{4}H_{10}, tetraborane, and [B_{12}H_{12}]^{2−}, dodecaborate.

== Beyond binary hydrides ==
This article focuses on species with the formula EH_{n}^{x}, where x is the charge (zero, negative, or positive). Expanding the scope to non-binary species, opens the way to large numbers of useful derivatives. Dialkylboron hydrides (e.g. 9-BBN) and dialkylaluminium hydrides (e.g. diisobutylaluminium hydride are reagents in organic synthesis and generally organoaluminium chemistry.
