= Hakim Muhammad Hassan Qarshi =

Pakistani physician

Shifa-ul-Mulk Hakim Muhammad Hassan Qarshi
- حکیم محمد حسن قرشی
- Pakistan Stamps 2002 Hakim Muhammad Hasan Qarshi
- Born: Muhammad Hassan; December 27, 1896; Gujrat, British India
- Died: 6 December 1974 (aged 77)
- Education: Ayurvedic and Unani Tibbia College, Delhi
- Occupation: Health practitioner in Unani medicine
- Years active: 1920 – 1974
- Spouse: Bilqees Begum
- Children: 4 sons and 3 daughters
- Father: Qazi Fazal Uddin

Hakim Muhammad Hassan Qarshi (December 27, 1896 – December 6, 1974) was a practitioner of Unani medicine, an author, and the founder of Qarshi Dawakhana. He was a student of Hakim Ajmal Khan and the family physician of Muhammad Iqbal from 1934 to 1938.

== Life and career ==
Qarshi was born on December 27, 1896, in Gujrat, Punjab, British India. He received his primary education in his hometown. He enrolled in Islamia College Lahore for further education, but was expelled from the college for participating in national movements. Then he entered Hakeem Ajmal Khan's Unani Tibbia College, Delhi. He had a special interest in medical knowledge. Noticing his passion for medical education, Hakim Ajmal Khan gave him the title of "Qarshi". He was entrusted with the responsibilities of the principal of the medical college, founded by Hakim Ajmal Khan in Bombay (now Mumbai). Qarshi strived throughout his life to give Unani Tib its rightful place in society.

Qarshi was a close friend and physician of Muhammad Iqbal during his last years. Earlier, upon the suggestion of Iqbal, he had founded the "Matab Qarshi" in 1920 in Lahore.

Qarshi remained an active member of Tibb Research Committee, Hyderabad and the Tibb Research Committee, Punjab from 1920 to 1946 in British India.

Qarshi also was an active member of Khilafat Movement and held the position of Vice President of his local Khilafat Committee in Lahore. He coordinated his efforts towards this, as a loyal team member, with the national leaders of this movement like Mohammad Ali Jauhar, Maulana Shaukat Ali and Maulana Zafar Ali Khan.

== Personal life ==
Qarshi married Bilqees Begum in 1922. They had 4 sons and 3 daughters together.

== Death ==
Qarshi died on December 6, 1974, at the age of 78.

== Books ==
- Bayaz-e-Maseeha
- Dastoor-ul-Atibba.
- Jame-ul-Hikmat
- Jame-ul-Hikmat
- Jinsi Amraz Ka Ilaj (Silk-e-Murwareed)
- Kitab-ul-Kulliyat.
- Mukhtasar-ul-Kulliyat

== Awards and honors ==
- On 20 December 2002, the Pakistan Post issued a commemorative postage stamp in the memory of Hakeem Muhammad Hassan Qureshi on the occasion of his 100th birthday.

== See also ==
- Hakim Muhammad Sharif Khan (1722 - 1807)
- Hakim Ajmal Khan (1868 - 1927)
- Hakeem Muhammad Saeed (1920 - 1998)
- Hakeem Rizwan Hafeez Malik
