= Semi-hydrogenation of alkynes =

Chemical process

Semi/partial hydrogenation of alkynes refers to the reduction of alkyne by one equivalent of hydrogen gas (H_{2}) to give alkene rather than the fully reduced alkane. This process is a valuable transformation in organic synthesis and industrial chemistry, enabling selective conversion of alkynes to either cis (Z) or trans (E) alkenes. A variety of methods have been developed for this purpose, including classical approaches like Lindlar's catalyst and the Birch reduction, as well as modern techniques involving transition metal catalysis. Each method offers distinct advantages in terms of stereoselectivity, functional group tolerance, and scalability, allowing chemists to tailor reductions to specific synthetic goals.

== Classical methods ==
=== Lindlar's catalyst ===
One of the most popular methods for partial alkyne hydrogenation is the use of Lindlar's catalyst. A Lindlar catalyst consists of

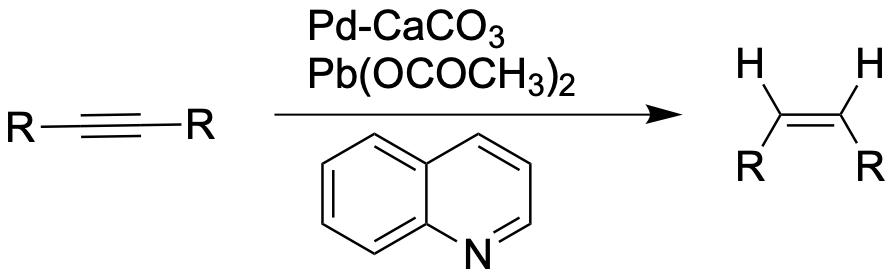
A Lindlar catalyst and subsequent semi-hydrogenation

two components. Palladium deposited on calcium carbonate serves as a reductant. Lead salts and quinoline act as poisons to limit the catalysts reactivity, avoiding overreduction to the alkane. Lindlar's catalyst gives the Z-alkene product exclusively.

=== Birch reduction ===
Alkynes can be partially reduced to alkenes with the use of sodium metal in ammonia at low temperatures. Two molar equivalents of sodium are used to deliver two electrons to the alkyne, which is then protonated by the ammonia. The E-alkene structure arises from the more stable tautomeric form of the anion. This reduction results in E-alkenes.

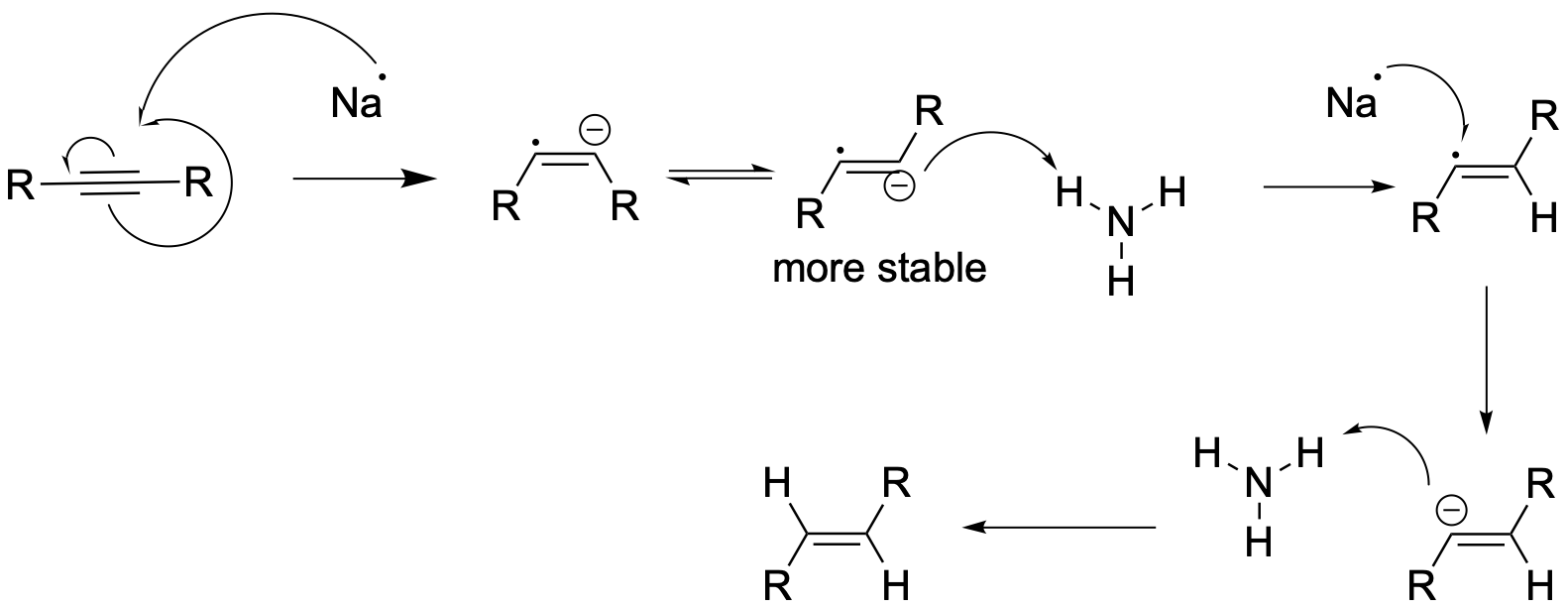
An alkyne is reduced by two equivalents of sodium metal and ammonia

== Modern methods for alkyne semi-hydrogenation ==
=== Transition metal catalysis ===
Further work has been done to develop specialized catalysts which partially hydrogenate alkynes in a selective E- or Z-manner. These catalysts rely on specialized ligands designed to select for the desired isomer and vary in their other functional group tolerability. Metals used in these catalysts include copper, palladium, ruthenium, iridium, manganese, nickel and vanadium. Specialty transition metal catalysts are advantageous because they can offer greater tolerance for functional groups. One such example is Elsevier's homogenous palladium catalyst as shown below which tolerates ester, carboxylic acid and nitro functional groups. Because alkynes coordinate to palladium better than alkenes, the reduced alkene is rapidly displaced by another alkene substituent, preventing over reduction.

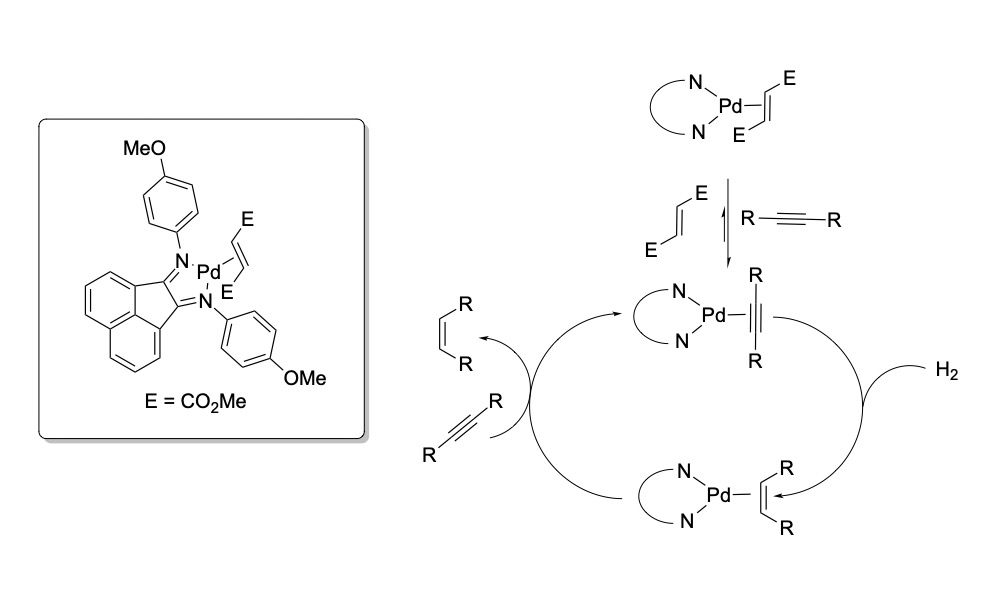
General mechanism for the semi-hydrogenation of an alkyne using Elsevier's palladium catalyst

Many transition metal catalysts tend to give the Z-alkene product because of the delivery of both hydrogen atoms by the metal on the same face of the alkene. Fürstner and coworkers were able to access a E-selective hydrogenation by developing a series of ruthenium catalysts. The authors suggest that the E-selectivity comes from the formation of a monohydride ruthenium

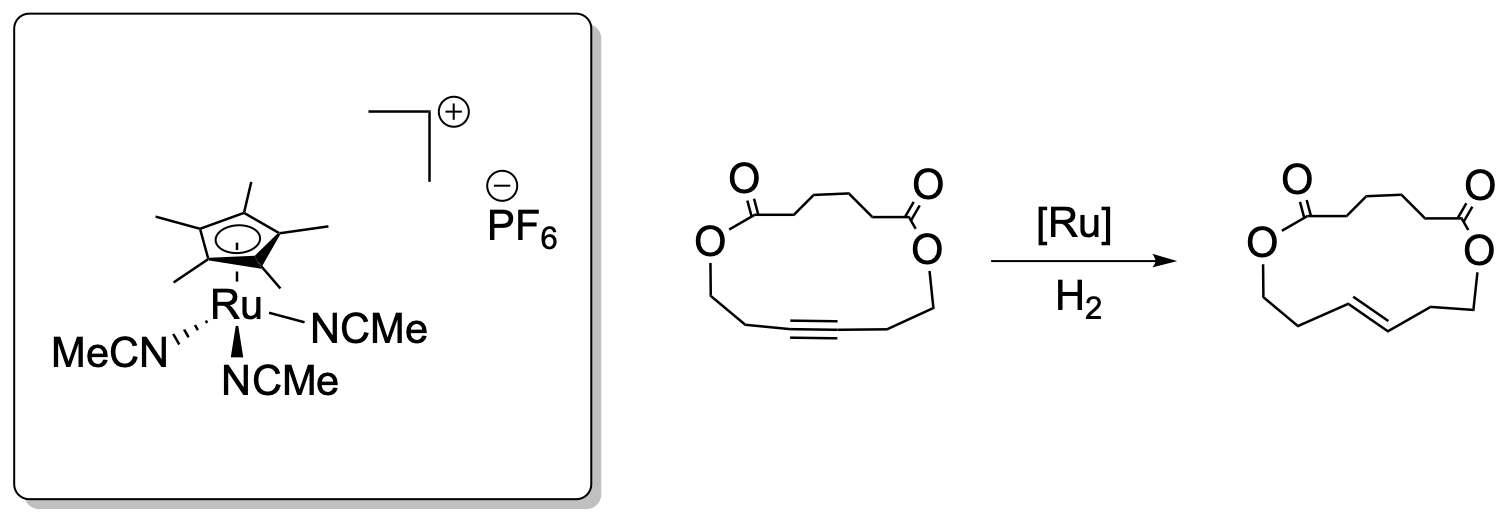
An example of one of Fürstner's semi-hydrogenation ruthenium catalysts and a reduction it completed

species, though a detailed mechanism is not proposed.

=== Nanoparticles ===
Palladium nanoparticles are a useful way to reduce alkynes. These are especially of interest at industrial scale, where acetylene gas needs to be reduced. These catalytic systems are efficient but suffer from over-reduction, so they are often poisoned using the same logic as Lindlar's catalyst. Common poisons include carbon monoxide, sulfur, or another metal such as gold, silver, copper, zinc or gallium. In most cases, the products are Z-selective.

== Hydrometalation ==
Several reactions are available wherein a hydrogen and metal or metalloid are added across an alkyne to form the vinyl metalloid. These products can be subsequently protodemetalated to give the alkene. These reactions are especially common with metalloids boron, silicon and tin because of the usefulness of the products in further cross-coupling reactions. However, hydrometallation of alkynes is also seen with metals such as zirconium and aluminum.

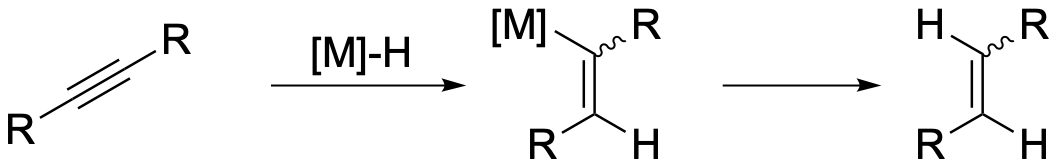
Alkynes can be partially reduced through a hydrometallation intermediate, where a metal and hydrogen atom are added across the pi bond.

=== Hydroboration ===
Hydroboration can be used to reduce alkynes to alkenyl boronates and proceeds without a catalyst. The reaction proceeds through complexation of the alkyne with a borane and results in the cis-addition of the boron and hydrogen across the bond. Catalyzed hydroborations exist, though the catalyst usually serves to form the diborane which is a very active hydroborating reagent. The regioselectivity of the boron addition varies based on the boron substituent.

=== Hydrosilylation ===
Early work on hydrosilylation used platinized charcoal or peroxides to catalyze a radical silylation, leading to trans-addition across the alkyne. Hydrosilylation of alkynes has also been achieved through strong lewis acid catalysis, also leading to trans-addition. Many hydrosilylation reactions are achieved through transition metal catalysis, including through cobalt, iridium, rhodium and ruthenium catalysis. The mechanisms for these reactions are complex and vary by catalyst which determine the regio- and E/Z selectivity of the final product.

=== Hydrostannation ===
Hydrostannation, or addition of tin across a bond, generally proceeds through a radical mechanism. The regioselectivity of the stannane addition is then determined by the most stable radical intermediate. The E/Z outcome of the addition varies by substrate. Hydrostannation can also be catalyzed by transition metals such as palladium, molybdenum, rhodium and ruthenium. These often lead to cis-addition across the alkyne, though recent examples of trans-addition exist.

=== Hydrozirconation ===
Hydrozirconation occurs through cis addition of the H and Zr atoms across the triple bond. The regioselectivity of the addition is often determined by sterics. Hydrozirconation of alkynes can be accomplished with Schwartz's reagent.

=== Hydroalumination ===
Hydroalumination is a useful way to prepare alkenyl aluminum compounds. These compounds are rarely isolated due to their instability but are helpful intermediates for interception with substrates to generate a desired alkene. Regioselectivity of the addition is generally poor unless a directing group is present on the compound. E or Z alkenes can be accessed through hydroalumination reactions depending on the type of aluminum reductant and directing groups present on the compound.
