= C20H26N2 =

The molecular formula C_{20}H_{26}N_{2} (molar mass: 294.43 g/mol, exact mass: 294.2096 u) may refer to:

- Ajmalan
- Dimetacrine, or acripramine
- Tetrindole
- Trimipramine
