= Aluminium hydride =

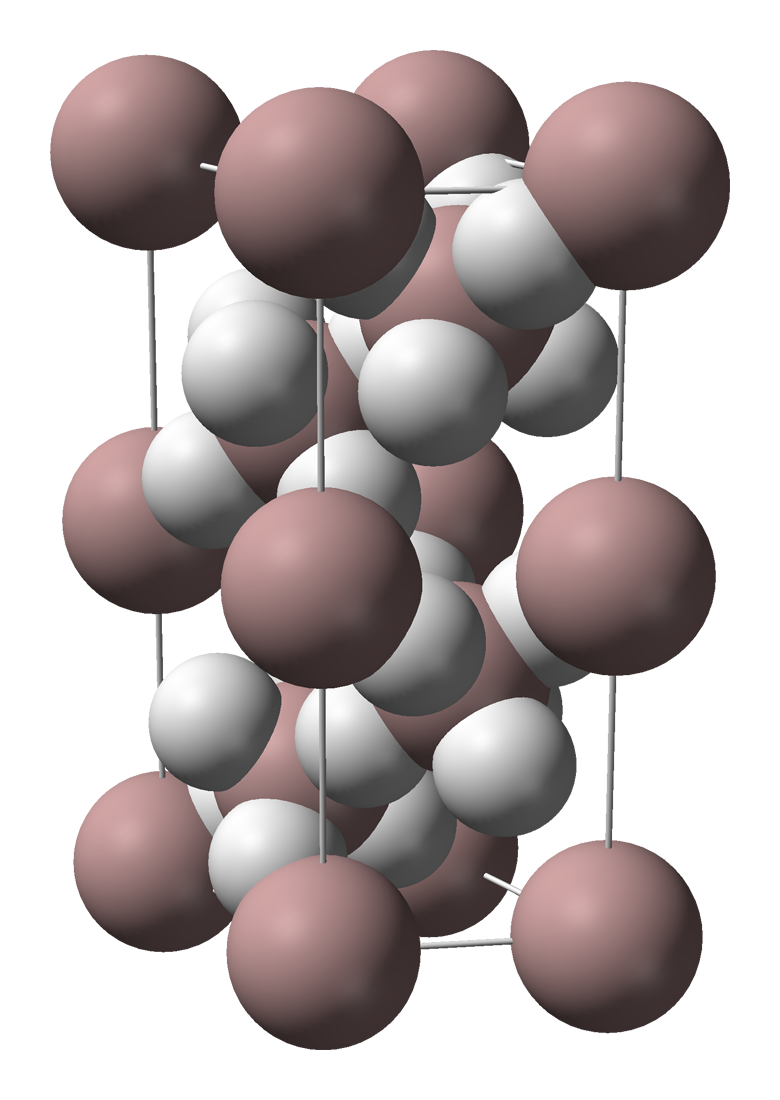
- Unit cell spacefill model of aluminium hydride

Names
- Preferred IUPAC name Aluminium hydride
- Systematic IUPAC name Alumane
- Other names: Alane; Aluminic hydride; Aluminium(III) hydride; Aluminium trihydride; Trihydridoaluminium

Identifiers
CAS Number	7784-21-6
3D model (JSmol)	Interactive image
ChEBI	CHEBI:30136
ChemSpider	13833; 17625618 (^{3}H_{3})
ECHA InfoCard	100.029.139
Gmelin Reference	245
PubChem CID	14488; 14399066 (^{2}H_{3}); 16721258 (^{3}H_{3})
UNII	KZJ3T010RQ
CompTox Dashboard (EPA)	DTXSID80895037
- InChI: InChI=1S/Al.3H Key: AZDRQVAHHNSJOQ-UHFFFAOYSA-N; InChI=1S/Al.3H Key: AZDRQVAHHNSJOQ-UHFFFAOYSA-N; InChI=1/Al.3H/rAlH3/h1H3 Key: AZDRQVAHHNSJOQ-FSBNLZEDAV
- SMILES: [AlH3]

Properties
Chemical formula	AlH_{3}
Molar mass	30.006 g·mol^{−1}
Appearance	white crystalline solid, non-volatile, highly polymerized, needle-like crystals
Density	1.477 g/cm^{3}, solid
Melting point	150 °C (302 °F; 423 K) starts decomposing at 105 °C (221 °F)
Solubility in water	reacts
Solubility	soluble in ether reacts in ethanol

Thermochemistry
Heat capacity (C)	40.2 J/(mol·K)
Std molar entropy (S^{⦵}_{298})	30 J/(mol·K)
Std enthalpy of formation (Δ_{f}H^{⦵}_{298})	−11.4 kJ/mol
Gibbs free energy (Δ_{f}G^{⦵})	46.4 kJ/mol

Related compounds
Other cations	Borane; Gallane; Indigane; Thallane
Related compounds	Lithium aluminium hydride Diborane; Digallane
- Except where otherwise noted, data are given for materials in their standard state (at 25 °C [77 °F], 100 kPa). verify (what is ?) Infobox references

Aluminium hydride (also known as alane and alumane) refers to a collection of inorganic compounds with the formula AlH_{3}. As a gas, alane is a planar molecule. When generated in ether solutions, it exists as an ether adduct. Solutions of alane polymerize to solids, which exist in several crystallographically distinguishable forms.

== Structure ==
=== Solid alane ===
Solid alane, which is colorless and nonvolatile, precipitates from ethereal solutions over the course of hours at room temperature. Numerous polymorphs can be obtained, which have been labeled α-, α'-, β-, γ-, ε-, and ζ-alanes. The best characterized solid alane is α-alane. According to X-ray crystallography, it adopts a cubic or rhombohedral morphology. It features octahedral AlH_{6} centers interconnected by Al-H-Al bridges. The Al-H distances are all equivalent (172 pm) and the Al-H-Al angles are 141°. α'-Alane forms needle-like crystals, and γ-alane forms bundles of fused needles.

Crystallographic Structure of α-AlH_{3}
The α-AlH_{3} unit cell	Aluminium coordination	Hydrogen coordination

=== Gaseous alane ===
Monomeric AlH_{3} is of theoretical and pedagogical interest. It has been isolated at low temperature in a solid noble gas matrix. It is a planar molecule with D_{3h} symmetry. The dimeric form, Al_{2}H_{6}, has been isolated in solid hydrogen. It is isostructural with diborane (B_{2}H_{6}) and digallane (Ga_{2}H_{6}).

== Handling ==
Alane is highly reactive toward oxygen and protic solvents, including water. According to some recommendations, it is handled like its usual precursor, lithium aluminium hydride). Alane reductions of organofluorine compounds have led to explosions.

== Preparation ==
Aluminium hydride is usually prepared by the reaction of aluminium trichloride with lithium aluminium hydride in ether solution. Its first synthesis was published in 1947, and a patent for the synthesis was assigned in 1999. The procedure is intricate: attention must be given to the removal of lithium chloride before the alane precipitates as a polymer:

3 Li[AlH_{4}] + AlCl_{3} + 8 O(C_{2}H_{5})_{2}→ 4 AlH_{3}·(O(C_{2}H_{5})_{2})_{2} + 3 LiCl
3 n AlH_{3}·(O(C_{2}H_{5})_{2})_{2} → (AlH_{3})_{n} + 2n O(C_{2}H_{5})_{2}

Intermediates in this reaction include LiAlCl_{3}H and Al_{2}H_{3}Cl_{3}. Al_{2}H_{3}Cl_{3}, which does not polymerize, is a distillable mixture.

Several other methods, some analogous to the Schlessinger reaction involving aluminium trichloride, exist for the preparation of aluminium hydride:

2 Li[AlH_{4}] + BeCl_{2} → 2 AlH_{3} + Li_{2}[BeH_{2}Cl_{2}]
2 Li[AlH_{4}] + H_{2}SO_{4} → 2 AlH_{3} + Li_{2}SO_{4} + 2 H_{2}
2 Li[AlH_{4}] + ZnCl_{2} → 2 AlH_{3} + 2 LiCl + ZnH_{2}
2 Li[AlH_{4}] + I_{2} → 2 AlH_{3} + 2 LiI + H_{2}
2 Li[AlH_{4}] + CH_{3}CO_{2}H → 2 AlH_{3} + Li[CH_{3}CH_{2}O] + LiOH

=== Electrochemical synthesis ===
Alane can be produced electrochemically. Different electrochemical alane production methods have been patented. Electrochemically generating alane avoids chloride impurities. Two mechanisms are discussed for the formation of alane in Clasen's electrochemical cell containing THF as the solvent, sodium aluminium hydride as the electrolyte, an aluminium anode, and an iron (Fe) wire submerged in mercury (Hg) as the cathode. The sodium forms an amalgam with the Hg cathode preventing side reactions and the hydrogen produced in the first reaction could be captured and reacted back with the sodium mercury amalgam to produce sodium hydride. Clasen's system results in no loss of starting material. For insoluble anodes, reaction 1 occurs, while for soluble anodes, anodic dissolution is expected according to reaction 2:

1. [AlH_{4}]^{−} − e^{−} + n THF → AlH_{3}·nTHF + 1/_{2} H_{2}
2. 3 [AlH_{4}]^{−} + Al − 3 e^{−} + 4n THF → 4 AlH_{3}·nTHF

In reaction 2, the aluminium anode is consumed, limiting the production of aluminium hydride for a given electrochemical cell.

The crystallization and recovery of aluminium hydride from electrochemically generated alane has been demonstrated.

=== High pressure hydrogenation of aluminium ===
α-AlH_{3} can be produced by hydrogenation of aluminium at 10 GPa and 600 °C (1,112 °F). The reaction between the liquified hydrogen produces α-AlH_{3} which could be recovered under ambient conditions.

== Reactions ==
=== Formation of adducts with Lewis bases ===
Structures of 1:2 and 1:1 adducts of alane with trimethylamine

It is revealing that that the synthesis of solid aluminium trihydride proceeds via a soluble intermediate ether adduct. These adducts are described as AlH_{3}((CH_{3}CH_{2})_{2}O)_{n}. THF behaves similarly. Reflecting the low basicity of ethers, these adducts are labile near room temperature, resulting in the formation of the binary phase AlH_{3}. Trimethylamine is a much stronger Lewis base, and the corresponding adducts are well characterized as both 1:1 and 1:2 complexes form with. Both are monomeric in the gas phase, but in the solid phase it is dimeric with bridging hydrogen centres, [(CH_{3})_{3}NAlH_{2}(μ-H)]_{2}. The 1:2 complex adopts a trigonal bipyramidal structure. The 1:1 complex is also pentacoordinate at aluminium, but with a bridging hydride ligand. It represents an adduct of the elusive dialane.

Some adducts (e.g. dimethylethylamine alane, (CH_{3}CH_{2})(CH_{3})_{2}N·AlH_{3}) thermally decompose to give aluminium and may have use in MOCVD applications.

The reaction with lithium hydride in ether produces lithium aluminium hydride:

AlH_{3} + LiH → Li[AlH_{4}]

Various alanates have been characterized beyond lithium aluminium hydride. They tend to feature five- and six-coordinate Al centers: Na_{3}AlH_{6}, Ca(AlH_{4)})_{2}, SrAlH_{5}).

=== Reduction of functional groups ===
Alane and its derivatives are reducing reagents in organic synthesis based around group 13 hydrides. In solution—typically in ethereal solvents such tetrahydrofuran or diethyl ether—aluminium hydride forms complexes with Lewis bases, and reacts selectively with particular organic functional groups (e.g., with carboxylic acids and esters over organic halides and nitro groups), and although it is not a reagent of choice, it can react with carbon-carbon multiple bonds (i.e., through hydroalumination). Given its density, and with hydrogen content on the order of 10% by weight, some forms of alane are, as of 2016, active candidates for storing hydrogen and so for power generation in fuel cell applications, including electric vehicles. As of 2006 it was noted that further research was required to identify an efficient, economical way to reverse the process, regenerating alane from spent aluminium product.

In organic chemistry, aluminium hydride is mainly used for the reduction of functional groups. In many ways, the reactivity of aluminium hydride is similar to that of lithium aluminium hydride. Aluminium hydride will reduce aldehydes, ketones, carboxylic acids, anhydrides, acid chlorides, esters, and lactones to their corresponding alcohols. Amides, nitriles, and oximes are reduced to their corresponding amines.

In terms of functional group selectivity, alane differs from other hydride reagents. For example, in the following cyclohexanone reduction, lithium aluminium hydride gives a trans:cis ratio of 1.9 : 1, whereas aluminium hydride gives a trans:cis ratio of 7.3 : 1.

Stereoselective reduction of a substituted cyclohexanone using aluminium hydride

Alane enables the hydroxymethylation of certain ketones (that is the replacement of C−H by C−CH_{2}OH at the alpha position). The ketone itself is not reduced as it is "protected" as its enolate.

Functional Group Reduction using aluminium hydride

Organohalides are reduced slowly or not at all by aluminium hydride. Therefore, reactive functional groups such as carboxylic acids can be reduced in the presence of halides.

Functional Group Reduction using aluminium hydride

Aluminium hydride reduces esters in the presence of nitro groups.

Ester reduction using aluminium hydride

Aluminium hydride reduces acetals to half protected diols.

Acetal reduction using aluminium hydride

Aluminium hydride reduces epoxides to their corresponding alcohols:

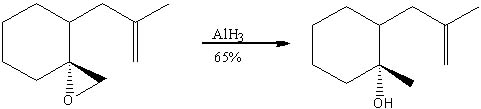
Epoxide reduction using aluminium hydride

The allylic rearrangement reaction carried out using aluminium hydride is a S_{N}2 reaction, and it is not sterically demanding:

Phosphine reduction using aluminium hydride

Aluminium hydride will reduce carbon dioxide to methane with heating:

4 AlH_{3} + 3 CO_{2} → 3 CH_{4} + 2 Al_{2}O_{3}

=== Hydroalumination ===
Akin to hydroboration, aluminium hydride can, in the presence of titanium tetrachloride, add across multiple bonds. When the multiple bond in question is a propargylic alcohols, the results are alkenylaluminium compounds.

Hydroalumination of 1-hexene

=== Fuel ===
In its passivated form, alane once was considered for Hydrogen storage. It contains up 10.1% hydrogen by weight (at a density of 1.48 grams per milliliter),

Alane is also a potential additive to solid rocket fuel and to explosive and pyrotechnic compositions. In its unpassivated form, alane is also a promising rocket fuel additive, capable of delivering impulse efficiency gains of up to 10%.

=== Deposition ===
Heated alane releases hydrogen gas and produces a very fine thin film of aluminum metal that can be deposited onto other materials.
