= Lithium tetrahydridogallate =

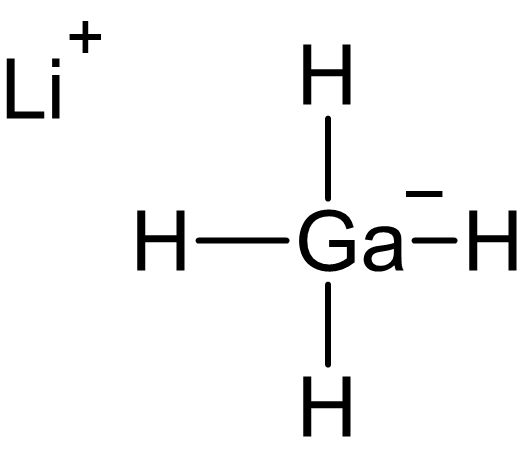

Names
- IUPAC name Lithium tetrahydridogallate(III)
- Other names Lithium gallium hydride Lithium tetrahydrogallate

Identifiers
CAS Number	17836-90-7
3D model (JSmol)	Interactive image
ChemSpider	25945327
- InChI: InChI=1S/Ga.Li.4H/q-1;+1;;;; Key: FRRLJROQAGRKMM-UHFFFAOYSA-N
- SMILES: [Li+].[GaH4-]

Properties
Chemical formula	LiGaH_{4}
Molar mass	80.7 g/mol
Appearance	white crystals (pure samples)
Melting point	70 °C (158 °F; 343 K) (decomposes)
Solubility in water	Reacts

Related compounds
Related hydride	Gallium hydride Sodium tetrahydridogallate Potassium tetrahydridogallate Cesium tetrahydridogallate
- Except where otherwise noted, data are given for materials in their standard state (at 25 °C [77 °F], 100 kPa). Infobox references

Lithium tetrahydridogallate is the inorganic compound with formula LiGaH_{4}. It is a white solid similar to but less thermally robust than lithium aluminium hydride.

== Synthesis ==
Lithium tetrahydridogallate was first reported by Finholt, Bond and Schlesinger. It is prepared by the reaction of lithium hydride and an ethereal solution of gallium trichloride:

GaCl_{3} + 4 LiH → LiGaH_{4} + 3 LiCl

The reactants are combined at -80 °C and then allowed to get to room temperature. Higher yields (80-95%) and reaction rates are possible by using gallium tribromide.

== Properties ==
Lithium tetrahydridogallate is easily dissolved in diethyl ether with which it forms a stable complex, making removal of the solvent difficult. Ethereal solutions of LiGaH_{4} are indefinitely stable if sealed in glass vessels at 0 °C. Lithium tetrahydridogallate can also be dissolved in tetrahydrofuran and diglyme.

Lithium tetrahydridogallate slowly decomposes at room temperature. The decomposition is fast at 70 °C and the reaction produces lithium hydride, gaseous hydrogen and metallic gallium. The reaction is autocatalyzed by the small particles of metallic gallium being formed.

== Reactivity ==
It can be generally stated that lithium tetrahydridogallate's reactivity is similar to lithium tetrahydridoaluminate's reactivity, but the first is less stable. This is due to the susceptibility of the gallium-hydrogen bonds to hydrolysis. As a consequence LiGaH_{4} is usually prepared in the absence of air.

Lithium tetrahydridogallate violently reacts with water by releasing 4 moles of gaseous hydrogen. It can generally be stated that lithium gallium hydride reacts with protic solvents.

Ethereal solutions of LiGaH_{4} are strongly reductant but less than LiBH_{4} and LiAlH_{4}. It reacts with primary and secondary amines to release gaseous hydrogen. LiGaH_{4} reduces acetamide and acetonitrile to ethylamine. Aliphatic acids, aldehydes and ketones are reduced to the corresponding alcohols. Aromatic nitriles, aldehydes, ketones and esters are not reduced.

== Usage ==
Lithium gallium hydride is often used to prepare other complex gallium hydrides. For example, it can be used to convert thallium trichloride into thallium tetrahydrogallate (which appears as a white solid powder that decomposes above -90 °C) and silver perchlorate into silver tetrahydrogallate (which appears as an orange-reddish solid powder that rapidly decomposes in ethereal solution above -75 °C). In the first case the reaction is carried out at a temperature of -115 °C, in the latter the reaction is carried out at -100 °C.

Reacting lithium gallium hydride and sodium hydride or potassium hydride yields respectively the more stable sodium tetrahydrogallate (decomposes in argon atmosphere at 165 °C) and potassium tetrahydrogallate (decomposes at about 230 °C). Both appear as white crystalline powders that can be preserved in the absence of water and moisture for more than one year.

Digallane is produced by reaction between lithium tetrahydrogallate and monochlorogallane.
