= Digallane =

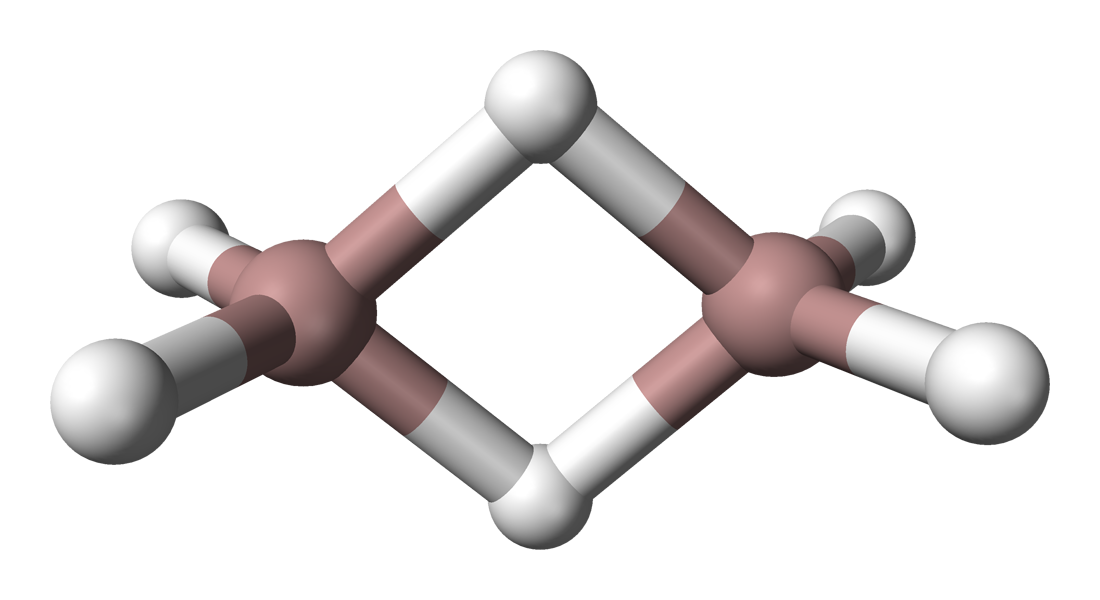

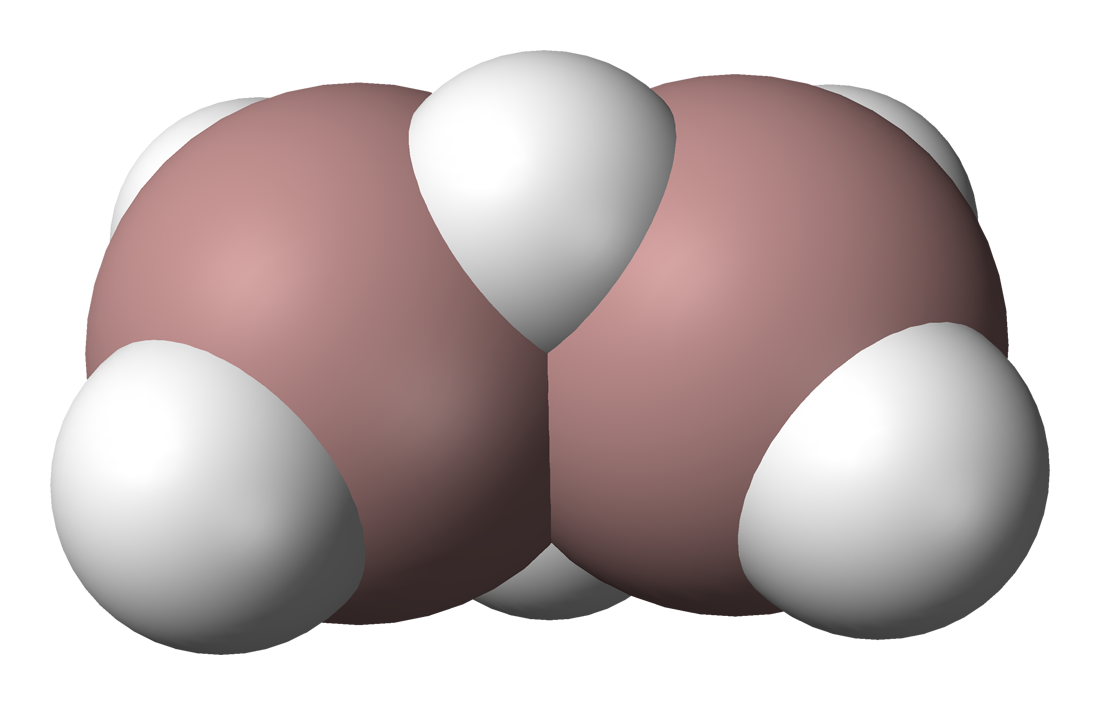

Names
- IUPAC name digallane(6)
- Other names Di-μ-hydrido-tetrahydridodigallium; Gallane dimer

Identifiers
CAS Number	12140-58-8
3D model (JSmol)	Interactive image
ChemSpider	24769416
- InChI: InChI=1S/2Ga.6H Key: GFQCQFDOQMRGIQ-UHFFFAOYSA-N
- SMILES: [GaH2]1[H][GaH2][H]1

Properties
Chemical formula	Ga_{2}H_{6}
Molar mass	145.494 g/mol
Appearance	White solid or colorless gas
Melting point	−50 °C (−58 °F; 223 K) (sublimes)
Boiling point	0 °C (32 °F; 273 K) (decomposes)
Solubility in water	Reacts to form gallium(III) hydroxide

Related compounds
Related compounds	Diborane; Aluminium hydride; Indium trihydride; Thallium hydride
- Except where otherwise noted, data are given for materials in their standard state (at 25 °C [77 °F], 100 kPa). verify (what is ?) Infobox references

Digallane (systematically named digallane(6)) is an inorganic compound with the chemical formula GaH_{2}(H)_{2}GaH_{2} (also written [{GaH_{2}(μ-H)}_{2}] or [Ga_{2}H_{6}]). It is the dimer of the monomeric compound gallane. The eventual preparation of the pure compound, reported in 1989, was hailed as a "tour de force." Digallane had been reported as early as 1941 by Wiberg; however, this claim could not be verified by later work by Greenwood and others. This compound is a colorless gas that decomposes above 0 °C.

== Preparation ==
A two-stage approach proved to be the key to successful synthesis of pure digallane. Firstly the dimeric monochlorogallane, (H_{2}GaCl)_{2} (containing bridging chlorine atoms and thus formulated as (H_{2}Ga(μ-Cl))_{2}) was prepared via the hydrogenation of gallium trichloride, GaCl_{3}, with trimethylsilane, Me_{3}SiH. This step was followed by a further reduction with Li[GaH_{4}] (lithium tetrahydrogallate), solvent free, at −23 °C, to produce digallane, Ga_{2}H_{6} in low yield.

Ga_{2}Cl_{6} + 4 Me_{3}SiH → (H_{2}GaCl)_{2} + 4 Me_{3}SiCl
(H_{2}GaCl)_{2} + 2 Li[GaH_{4}] → 2 Ga_{2}H_{6} + 2 LiCl

Digallane is volatile and condenses at −50 °C into a white solid.

== Structure ==
Electron diffraction measurements of the vapour at 255 K established that digallane is structurally similar to diborane with 2 bridging hydrogen atoms (so-called three-center two-electron bonds). The terminal Ga-H bond length is 152 pm, the Ga-H bridging is 171 pm and the Ga-H-Ga angle is 98°. The Ga-Ga distance is 258 pm. The ^{1}H NMR spectrum of a solution of digallane in toluene shows two peaks attributable to terminal and bridging hydrogen atoms.

In the solid state, digallane appears to adopt a polymeric or oligomeric structure. The vibrational spectrum is consistent with tetramer (i.e. (GaH_{3})_{4}). The vibrational data indicate the presence of terminal hydride ligands. In contrast, the hydrogen atoms are all bridging in α-alane, a high-melting, relatively stable polymeric form of aluminium hydride wherein the aluminium centers are 6-coordinated. Digallane decomposes at ambient temperatures:

Ga_{2}H_{6} → 2 Ga + 3 H_{2}
