= Ayurvedic and Unani Tibbia College =

Indian college affiliated to the University of Delhi

Coordinates: 28°39′21″N 77°11′41″E

- Established: 1882
- Founder: Hakim Ajmal Khan
- Affiliations: University of Delhi
- Principal: Mohammad Zubair
- Director: Raj Kumar Manchanda
- Location: Delhi, Delhi NCT, 110005, India
- Campus: Urban, 33.5 acres (0.136 km^{2})
- Website: autch.delhi.gov.in

The Ayurvedic and Unani Tibbia College, also known as Tibbia College, is an institution of the Government of Delhi in Karol Bagh in Delhi, India. The institution, which offers education and training in ayurvedic and Unani medicine, has its origins in the late 19th century. The college was founded by Charles Hardinge, 1st Baron Hardinge of Penshurst on 29 March 1916 and inaugurated by Mahatma Gandhi on 13 February 1921. It offers bachelor's degrees—the Bachelor of Ayurveda, Medicine and Surgery & BUMS degrees—and a master's (MD) degree in ayurvedic and Unani forms of medicine.

On 15 February 2008, a 60-bed maternity and child ward at Tibbia College Hospital was established, and the Delhi government announced plans to transform the college into a university, acknowledging its contributions to ayurvedic and Unani medicine.

== History ==
=== Beginning years ===
It was first established by Hakim Abdul Majeed in 1882 in Gali Qasim Jan, a locality in Chandni Chowk, one of the oldest and busiest markets in Delhi, India. In 1889, after inauguration by a local commissioner, it was referred to as Madrasa Tibbia that functioned under the Anjuman-e-Tibbia society. After the death of Majeed in 1901, his younger brother Hakim Wasil took over the Madrasa and in 1903, Masih-ul-Mulk Mohammad Ajmal Khan (1863-1927 CE), better known as Hakim Ajmal Khan raised the quality of the institution. The efforts of Hakim Ajmal Khan helped extend the site over an area more than of 50 acres including a garden of herbs (Jadi Booti Bagh) across the road. At present is named after Hakim Ajmal Khan as "Ajmal Khan Park" maintained by MCD. The road has also been named after Hakim Ajmal Khan as "Ajmal Khan Road", a popular shopping area of Delhi.

=== Inauguration ===
After its foundation laid down by Lord Hardinge, the then Viceroy of India on 29 March 1916, the college had buildings that housed classrooms, laboratories, hospital pharmacies, hostels, office and staff quarters. A mix of classical, colonial, Mughul and Indian architecture was utilized for constructing the College buildings. This institution was the first architectural marvel in the newly founded capital of India.It came into existence much before the parliament, north and south avenues, India Gate etc. This institution was inaugurated by Father of the Nation Mahatma Gandhi on 13 February 1921. Ajmal Khan previously corresponded with Mahatma Gandhi during the Khilafat Movement, a political campaign launched mainly by Muslims in British India in the aftermath of the World War I and because of his close association with Gandhi, on 13 February 1921, the latter formally inaugurated the college.

=== Effect of Partition Riots ===
The Partition Riots which spread to Delhi in September 1947 affected the functioning of the college. The refugees who settled in Karol Bagh took possession of the college building and its all furniture was disposed of, its property was ransacked and its boarding house was also occupied. This whole episode severely affected the working of the college. A majority of members of the governing body and students were Muslims, and many of them including Ajmal khan family members of the founder Hakim Ajmal Khan migrated to Pakistan in December 1947.

== Activities ==
=== Research era ===
It was Hakeem Ajmal Khan's father, his brothers, and him who brought two ancient systems of medicine, Ayurvedic and Unani, to one platform resulting in the institution to be one of its kind in India. The main objective behind the institution is to promote Indian medical science and to amalgamate both these systems of medicine. Dr. Salimuzzaman Siddiqui, a notable Pakistani scientist in natural products chemistry was requested by Hakeem Ajmal Khan to initiate the Ayurvedic and Unani Tibbi Research Institute. He continued to be the institute's director until after Ajmal Khan's death in 1927.

Besides the college and hospital, Ajmal Khan and his brothers, Hakim Wasil Khan and Hakim Majeed Khan, helped establish Hindustani Dawakhana and Ayurvedic Rasayanashastra for manufacturing medicines. The Dawakhana, which appears as a Gothic cathedral with its curious blend of Asiatic and Latin architecture, was founded in 1910. Due to the availability of the herbal garden within its campus, the dispensary was able to obtain patents for 84 rare herbal formulae like Musafi, Sarbat-e-Sadar, Sekhon and Hebab-Kebatare. The institution developed and researched several unparalleled medicines, such Rauwolfia serpentina, the medicine to recover the lunatic mind.

=== Academic Programme ===
In 1973, the college was affiliated to the University of Delhi. The five and a half year degrees that are offered by the university are:

Bachelor of Ayurvedic Medicine and Surgery (in short B.A.M.S.) & Bachelor of Unani Medicine and Surgery (in short B.U.M.S.)

Besides under-graduate courses in Ayurveda & Unani stream, the post-graduate (MD/MS) courses are also imparted in the following specialties:

PG courses in Ayurveda: i. Kaya chikitisa (Medicine) ii. Kriya. Sharir (Physiology) iii. Panchakarma iv. Dravyaguna

PG courses in Unani: i. Ilm-us-Saidla (Pharmaceutical Science) ii. Munafe-ul-Aza (Physiology) iii. Moalejat (Medicine) iv. Amraz-Nissan wa Qabalat ( Gyanae & Obs)

=== Management ===
Previously this college and allied units were managed by a Board established under Tibbia College Act, 1952. This Act was repealed by another Act known as Delhi Tibbia College (Take Over) Act, 1998 and enforced by the Govt. of NCT of Delhi w.e.f. 1 May 1998.

== Notable alumni ==
- Hakim Muhammad Hassan Qarshi (1896 – 1974)

== See also ==
- Dawakhana Shifaul Amraz
- Government Nizamia Tibbi College
