= Borderline hydrides =

Borderline hydrides typically refer to hydrides formed of hydrogen and elements of the periodic table in group 11 and group 12 and indium (In) and thallium (Tl). These compounds have properties intermediate between covalent hydrides and saline hydrides. Hydrides are chemical compounds that contain a metal and hydrogen acting as a negative ion.

== Properties ==
Borderline hydrides exhibit bonding characteristics between ionic and covalent bond types. A specific example of a borderline hydride is CuH, copper hydride, that appears as a spongy reddish-brown substance is a moderate reducing agent. It will catalytically oxidize hypophosphorous acid to phosphorous acid at room temperature, and it gives off hydrogen gas when subjected to heat. ZnH_{2} is also a solid at room temperature that breaks down at 90 °C, but even left alone decomposes over several days to zinc metal and hydrogen gas. Hydrogen telluride (H_{2}Te) and hydrogen selenide (H_{2}Se) are both borderline hydrides of high volatility that produce strong, unpleasant odors.

== Examples ==
- (CuH)_{n} copper hydride
- (ZnH_{2})_{n} zinc(II) hydride
- HgH_{2} mercury(II) hydride
- TlH_{3} thallium hydride

== Synthesis ==
Borderline hydrides are most commonly formed via the acidification or reduction of metal salts. For instance, copper hydride is formed by reacting copper sulfate and hypophosphorous acid at about 70 °C, forming a yellow precipitate that soon turns red-brown. Zinc hydride, ZnH_{2}, can be formed by the reduction of either a zinc halide or dimethylzinc.

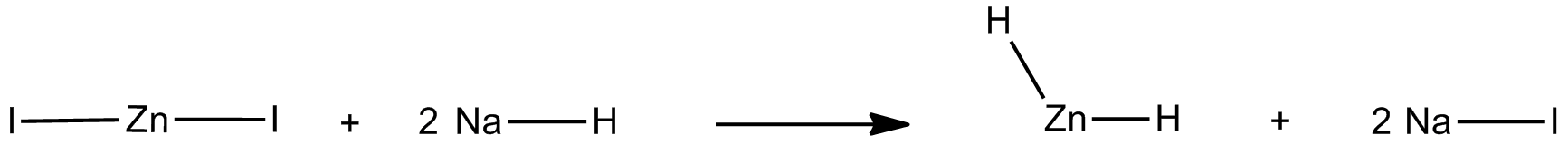
ZnH_{2} synthesis via reduction of zinc iodide

== Alternative definition ==
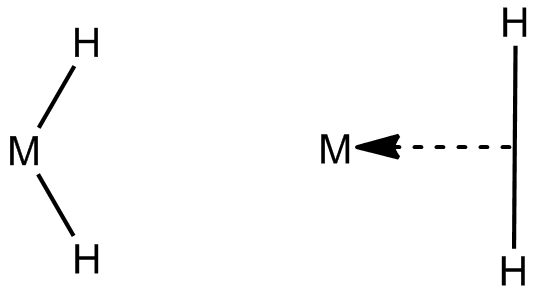
An example of the classical dihydride M(H)_{2} (left) compared to the non-classical M(H_{2}) dihydrogen bonding (right).

A more recent definition of borderline hydrides refers to hydrides that exist between classic and non-classic dihydrides. The classic form is the dihydride M(H)_{2} configuration, where the metal is bound to two free hydrogen atoms. The non-classic form contains two hydrogen atoms bound to a central metal atom with an η^{2}-H_{2} hapticity, indicating that a single coordination point on the metal atom bonds to two contiguous atoms from another molecule, in this case H_{2}. A well-known example of this is from the first such molecule to be synthesized with a coordinated hydrogen ligand (dihydrogen complex): W(CO)_{3}(PPri_{3})_{2}(η^{2}-H_{2}). Classic dihydrides containing the dihydride M-(H)_{2} ligands are typically found as a tautomer with the non-classical dihydrogen complexes containing a M-(η^{2}-H_{2}) group.

Borderline hydrides exist with a bond character somewhere between the classical and non-classical hydrides. Those that are thermally unstable exhibit stretching frequencies ν_{HH} greater than 2150 cm^{−1} as a result of poor electron donation from the metal center. An electron dense metal center will yield hydride with a ν_{HH} less than 2060 cm^{−1}, while anything between is considered to be in the borderline region. Kubas, et al. state that a stretching frequency of 2090 cm^{−1} is within the bounds of stable H_{2} complexes while 2060 cm^{−1} is right on the borderline between dihydrogen and dihydrides.
