= Ajmalan =

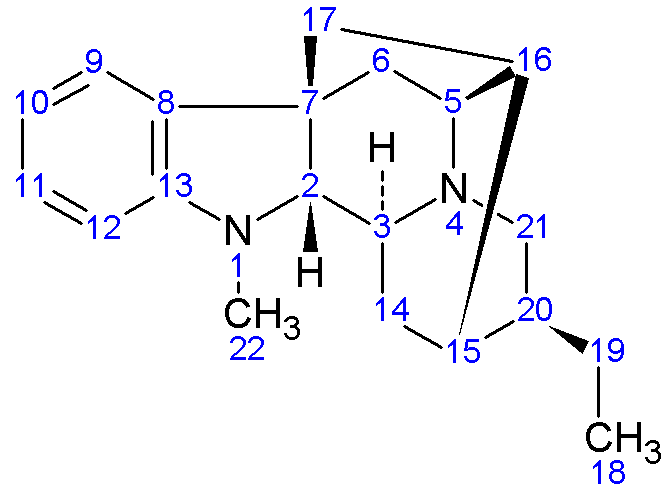
- The conventional representation of the ajmalan skeleton, with numbering

Names
- IUPAC name (1S,9R,10S,12S,13S,16S,17S)-13-Ethyl-8-methyl-8,15-diazahexacyclo[14.2.1.0^{1,9}.0^{2,7}.0^{10,15}.0^{12,17}]nonadeca-2,4,6-triene

Identifiers
| CAS Number | 34612-39-0 |
| 3D model (JSmol) | Interactive image |
| ChEBI | CHEBI:37673 |
| ChemSpider | 21429431 |
| PubChem CID | 9548857 |
- InChI: InChI=1S/C20H26N2/c1-3-12-11-22-17-8-13(12)14-9-20(10-18(14)22)15-6-4-5-7-16(15)21(2)19(17)20/h4-7,12-14,17-19H,3,8-11H2,1-2H3/t12-,13+,14+,17+,18+,19+,20+/m1/s1 Key: AJONLKUQHMDAFG-UAWDQXROSA-N
- SMILES: CC[C@@H]1CN2[C@H]3C[C@@H]1[C@H]4[C@@H]2C[C@]5(C4)[C@H]3N(c6c5cccc6)C
- Except where otherwise noted, data are given for materials in their standard state (at 25 °C [77 °F], 100 kPa). Infobox references

Ajmalan is a parent hydride used in the IUPAC nomenclature of natural products and also in CAS nomenclature. It is a 20-carbon alkaloid with six rings and seven chiral centres.

The name is derived from ajmaline, an antiarrhythmic alkaloid isolated from the roots of Rauvolfia serpentina which is formally a dihydroxy-derivative of ajmalan. The –an ending indicates that ajmalan is partially saturated. Ajmaline itself is named after Hakim Ajmal Khan, a distinguished practitioner of the Unani school of traditional medicine in South Asia.

The absolute configuration of the seven chiral carbon atoms in ajmalan is defined by convention, as is the numbering system. The stereochemistry is the same as that in naturally occurring ajmaline, and corresponds to (2R,3S,5S,7S,15S,16R,20S) using conventional numbering.

Ajmalan can be systematically named as

(1S,4S,5S,7S,8R,16S,17R)-4-ethyl-9-methyl-2,9-diazahexacyclo[14.2.1.0^{2,7}.0^{5,18}.0^{8,16}.0^{10,15}]nonadeca-10,12,14-triene

or as

(2S,3S,5S,6aS,11aR,11bS,12R)-4H,11H-3-ethyl-11-methyl-1,2,3,5,6,6a,11a,11b-octahydro-2,5,6a-(epiethane[1,1,2]triyl)indolo[2,3-c]quinolizine.

Note that the numbering of the atoms in the systematic names is different from the conventional numbering of ajmalan.

The ajmalan skeleton is similar to those of certain other alkaloids, and ajmalan could also be given the following semisystematic names:

(2β,5β,16R,20β)-1-methyl-1,2,19,20-tetrahydro-5,16-cyclo-16a-homo-17-norakuammilan;
(2β,5β,7β,16R,20β)-1-methyl-2,7-dihydro-5,16:7,17-dicyclocorynan;
(2β,7β,16R,20β)-1-methyl-2,7,19,20-tetrahydro-7,17-cyclosarpagan;
(2β,3α,7β,20β)-1-methyl-2,7,19,20-tetrahydro-3,4:7,17-dicyclo-22-norvobasan;
(2β,5β,7β,16R,20β)-1-methyl-2,7-dihydro-5,16:7,17-dicyclo-17-secoyohimban.

However, the relative complexity even of these names justifies the use of ajmalan as a defined parent hydride in alkaloid nomenclature.
