= Gallane =

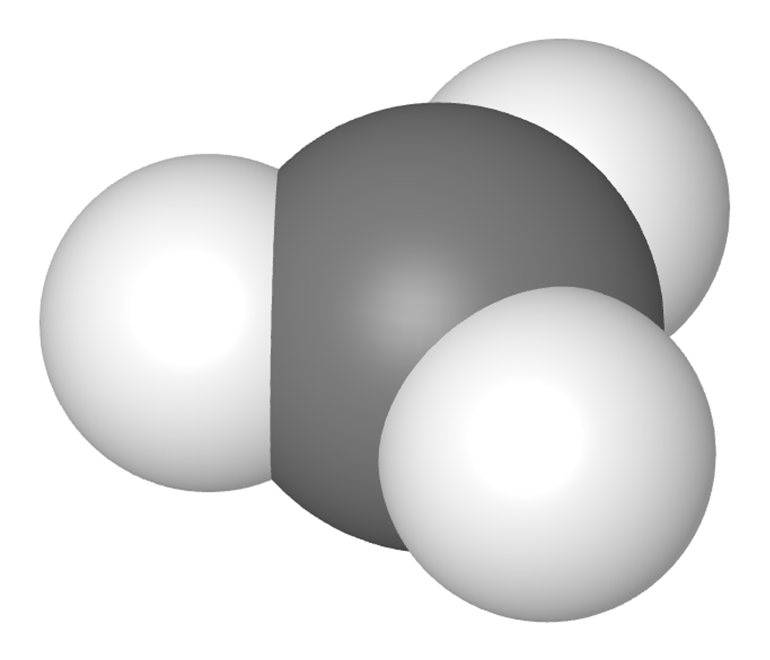

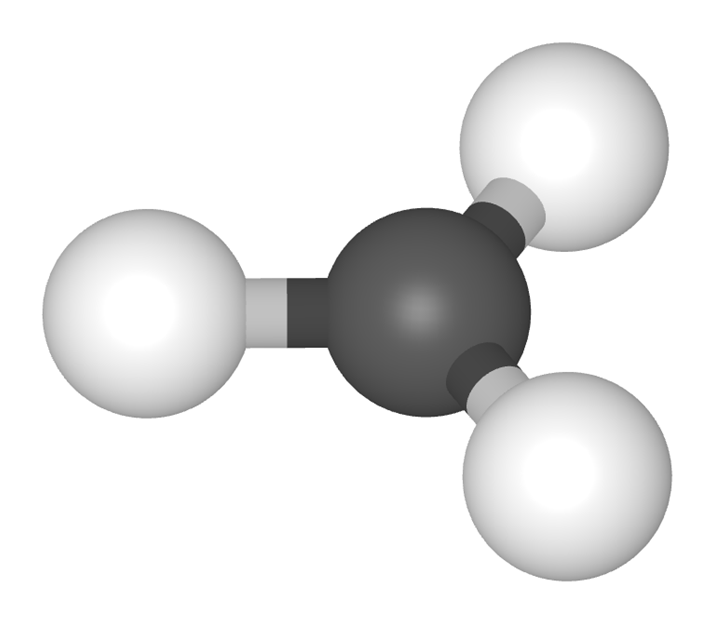

Names
- IUPAC names gallane
- Other names trihydridogallium gallium hydride hydrogen gallide

Identifiers
CAS Number	13572-93-5
3D model (JSmol)	Interactive image
ChEBI	CHEBI:30427
ChemSpider	22419
Gmelin Reference	48991
PubChem CID	23983
CompTox Dashboard (EPA)	DTXSID8064696
- InChI: InChI=1S/Ga.3H Key: PHMDYZQXPPOZDG-UHFFFAOYSA-N
- SMILES: [GaH3]

Properties
Chemical formula	GaH_{3}
Molar mass	72.747 g·mol^{−1}
Appearance	colourless gas
Solubility in water	hydrolyses

Structure
Molecular shape	trigonal planar
- Except where otherwise noted, data are given for materials in their standard state (at 25 °C [77 °F], 100 kPa). Infobox references

Gallane, also systematically named trihydridogallium, is an inorganic compound of gallium with the chemical formula GaH_{3} (also written as [GaH_{3}]). It is a photosensitive, colourless gas that cannot be concentrated in pure form. Gallane is both the simplest member of the gallanes, and the prototype of the monogallanes. It has no economic uses, and is only intentionally produced for academic reasons.

It has been detected as a transient species in the gas phase; also at low temperature (3.5 K) following the reaction of laser ablated gallium atoms and dihydrogen, and more recently in an argon matrix doped with vapour over solid digallane, Ga_{2}H_{6}.

== Structure ==
Gallane is produced by the reaction of solid Ga_{2}Cl_{2}H_{4} with tetrahydrogallate salts:

Ga_{2}Cl_{2}H_{4} + 2 LiGaH_{4} → Ga_{2}H_{6} + 2 LiGaClH_{3}

IR spectroscopic studies indicate that monomeric GaH_{3} has a trigonal planar structure. Ga-H bond lengths have been calculated as being in the range 155.7 pm to 158.7 pm.

Monomeric GaH_{3} dimerises in the vapor phase to form Ga_{2}H_{6}, digallane(6) and the enthalpy change associated with the gas phase dissociation reaction Ga_{2}H_{6} → 2GaH_{3} has been experimentally estimated as 59 ± 16 kJ mol^{−1}.

Condensation of gallane gives a colorless solid that melts near -50 °C. This solid (or its vapors) decomposes to the elements above -30 °C, shown with an equation that assumes that the solid is digallane:

Ga_{2}H_{6} → 2 Ga + 3 H_{2}

In fact, above 25K, solid gallane appears to be a polymer or tetramer.

== Chemical properties ==
As GaH_{3} cannot be prepared or isolated readily reactions involving GaH_{3} either use the dimer, Ga_{2}H_{6}, digallane(6) or adducts of GaH_{3} for example L·GaH_{3} where L is a monodentate ligand.

=== GaH_{3} adducts ===
The production of adducts can proceed via the direct reaction of digallane(6) or more often due to the thermal fragility of digallane(6) (which decomposes to gallium metal and hydrogen above −20 °C) using a tetrahydridogallate salt as a starting point (e.g. LiGaH_{4}) or alternatively via ligand displacement from an existing adduct. Examples are:

Ga_{2}H_{6} + 2 NMe_{3} → (NMe_{3})_{2}·GaH_{3} (−95°C)
LiGaH_{4} + Me_{3}NHCl → LiCl + H_{2}+ Me_{3}N·GaH_{3}
Me_{2}NH + Me_{3}N·GaH_{3} → Me_{2}NH·GaH_{3} + Me_{3}N

Many adducts have been prepared. There are a number of typical structures with neutral adducts (L = monodentate ligand, L-L is bidentate):

L.GaH_{3} (1:1 complex with monodentate ligand giving 4 coordinate gallium)
L_{2}·GaH_{3} (2:1 complex with monodentate ligand giving 5 coordinate gallium)
H_{3}Ga·L-L·GaH_{3} (1:2 complex with a bidentate ligand with two 4 coordinate gallium atoms)
L'H_{3}Ga·L-L·GaH_{3}L' (complex with monodentate and bidentate ligands with two 5 coordinate gallium atoms)
LGaH_{2}(μ-H)_{2}GaH_{2}L ( 2:2 hydrogen bridged complex)
(-L-LGaH_{3}-)_{n} (1:1 complex with a bidentate ligand forming a polymeric structure)

In comparison to alane (AlH_{3}) with similar ligands, gallane tends to adopt lower coordination numbers. Also whilst N donor ligands form stronger bonds to alumane than phosphines the reverse is typically true for gallane. The monomeric structure of Me_{3}N^{.}GaH_{3} has been confirmed in both the gas and solid phases. In this regard, the 1:1 adduct contrasts with the corresponding alane complex, Me_{3}N^{.}AlH_{3} which in the solid is dimeric with bridging hydrogen atoms.

It dissolves in polar compounds such as tetramethylethylenediamine, from which it can be crystallised as gallane—N,N,N′,N′-tetramethylethane-1,2-diamine (1/1).

== See also ==
- Digallane
