= Hakim Ajmal Khan =

Indian physician and politician (1868–1927)

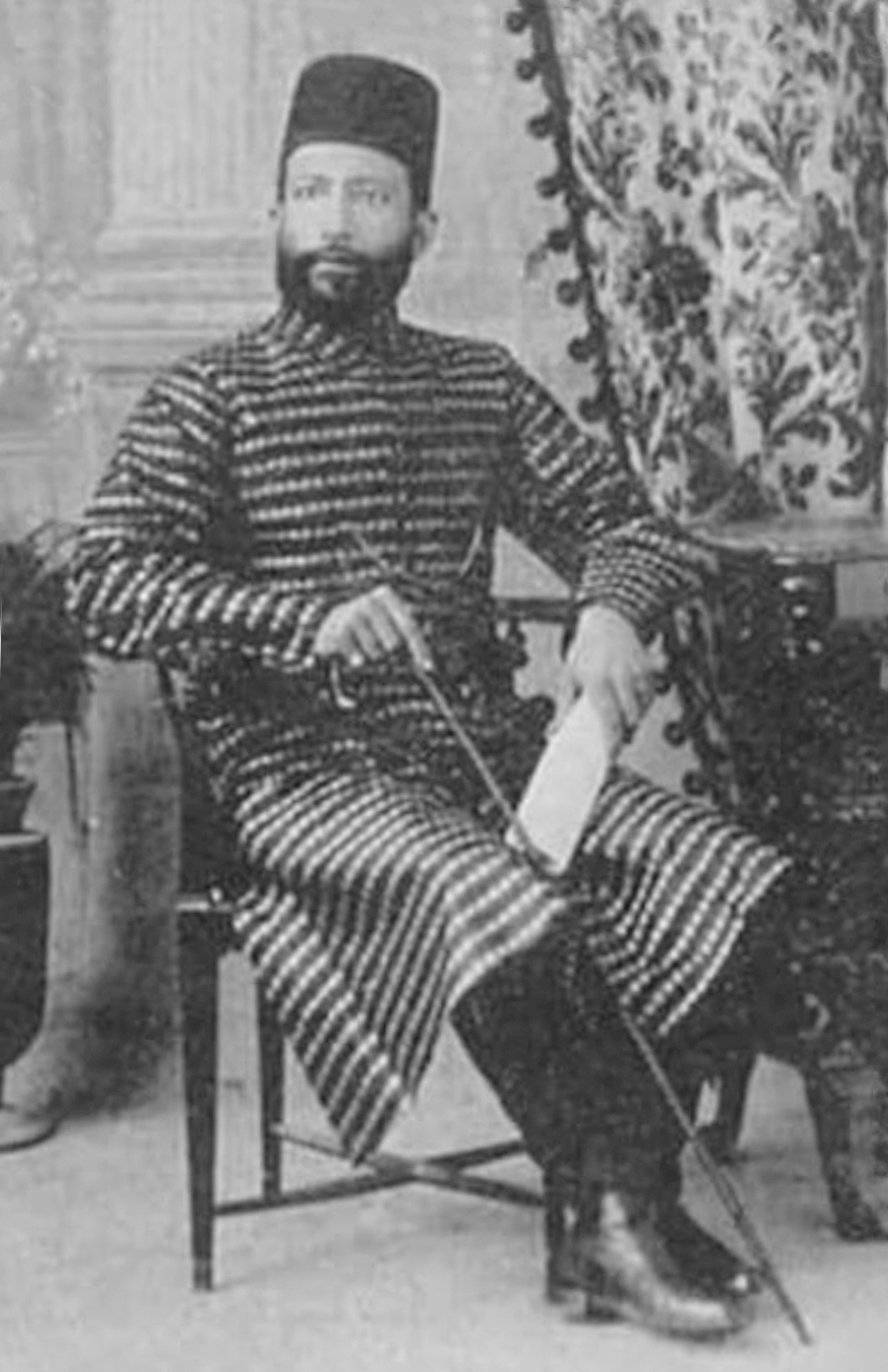
- Khan in 1921

39th President of Indian National Congress
- In office 1921–1922
- Preceded by: C. Vijayaraghavachariar
- Succeeded by: Chittaranjan Das
- Born: 11 February 1864; Delhi, British India
- Died: 20 December 1927 (aged 63); Delhi, British India
- Resting place: Hazrat Rasool Numa compound in Panchkuian Road, Delhi, India
- Monuments: Delhi Tibbia College and Jamia Millia Islamia
- Occupations: Physician, Politician, Spiritual Healer, Sufi Mystic, Herbalist, Poet
- Known for: Founder of Jamia Millia Islamia and Tibbia College, Delhi; Founding Member and President All-India Muslim League; President, Indian National Congress
- Notable work: Haziq
- Children: 1
- Family: Khandan e Sharifi

Mohammad Ajmal Khan (11 February 1864 – 29 December 1927), better known as Hakim Ajmal Khan, was a physician in Delhi, India, and one of the founders of the Jamia Millia Islamia university in Delhi, India.

He also founded another institution, Ayurvedic and Unani Tibbia College, better known as Tibbia College, situated in Karol Bagh, Delhi. He was the only Muslim to chair a session of the Hindu Mahasabha. He became the Jamia Millia Islamia's first chancellor in 1920 and remained in office until his death in 1927.

== Biography ==
Born on 11 February 1864, Khan descended from a line of physicians who had come to India during the reign of Mughal Emperor Babar. His family were all Unani doctors, hakims who had practised this ancient form of medicine since their arrival in the country. They were then known as the Rais of Delhi. His grandfather, Hakim Sharif Khan, was a physician to Mughal Emperor, Shah Alam and had built the Sharif Manzil, a hospital-cum-college teaching Unani medicine.

Hakim Ajmal Khan learnt the Quran by heart and as a child studied traditional Islamic knowledge, including Arabic and Persian, before turning his energy to the study of medicine under the guidance of his senior relatives, all of whom were well-known physicians. To promote the practice of Tibb-i-Unani or Unani medicine, his grandfather had set up the Sharif Manzil hospital-cum-college known throughout the subcontinent as one of the best philanthropic Unani hospitals, where treatment for poor patients was free. He completed his Unani studies under Hakeem Abdul Jameel of Siddiqui Dawakhana, Delhi.

On qualifying in 1892, Hakim Ajmal Khan became chief physician to the Nawab of Rampur. Hailed as "Massiha-e-Hind" (Healer of India) and "a king without a crown", Hakim Ajmal Khan, like his father, was reputed to effect miraculous cures and to have possessed a "magical" medicine chest, the secrets of which were known to him alone.

Such was his medical acumen that it is said that he could diagnose any illness by just looking at a person's face. Hakim Ajmal Khan charged Rs. 1000 per day for an out-of-town visit but if the patient came to Delhi, he was treated free, regardless of his position in society.

Khan worked in several different issues. He was involved in the movement for independence in India and supported efforts to promote national unity and religious harmony.

He took great interest in the expansion and development of the native system of Unani medicine and to that end built three important institutions, the Central College in Delhi, the Hindustani Dawakhana and the Ayurvedic and Unani Tibbia College better known as Tibbia College, Delhi, which expanded research and practice in the field and saved the Unani System of Medicine from extinction in India. His untiring efforts in this field infused a new force and life into an otherwise decaying Unani medical system under British rule. Khan proposed the absorption of Western concepts within the Unani system, a view diametrically opposite to that adopted by physicians of the Lucknow school, who wanted to maintain the system's purity.

Hakim Ajmal Khan also recognised the talents of chemist Dr. Salimuzzaman Siddiqui, whose subsequent research into important medicinal plants used in the field gave Unani medicine a new direction.

As one of its founders, Khan was elected first chancellor of the Jamia Milia Islamia University on 22 November 1920, holding the position until his death in 1927. During this period he oversaw the University's move to Delhi from Aligarh and helped it to overcome various crises, including financial ones, when he carried out extensive fund raising and often bailed it out using his own money.

== Politics ==
Hakim Ajmal Khan switched from medicine to politics after he started writing for the Urdu weekly Akmal-ul-Akhbar, launched by his family. Khan also headed the Muslim team who met the Viceroy of India in Simla in 1906 and presented him with a memorandum written by the delegation. At the end of December 1906, he actively participated at the Dhaka founding of the All India Muslim League on 30 December 1906. At a time when many Muslim leaders faced arrest, Khan approached Mahatma Gandhi for help in 1917, thereafter uniting with him and other Muslim leaders such as Maulana Azad, Maulana Mohammad Ali Jauhar and Maulana Shaukat Ali in the well-known Khilafat movement. Khan was also the sole person elected to the Presidency of the Indian National Congress, the Muslim League and the All India Khilafat Committee.

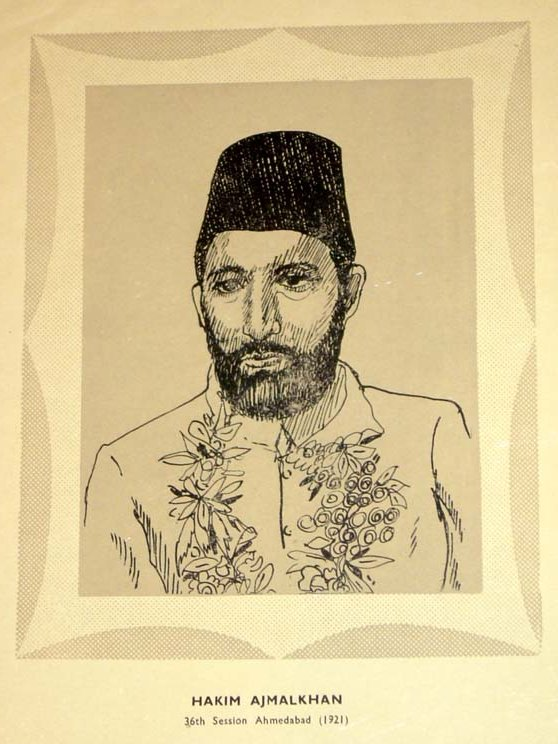
Hakim Ajmal Khan Congress president 1921

== Death and legacy ==
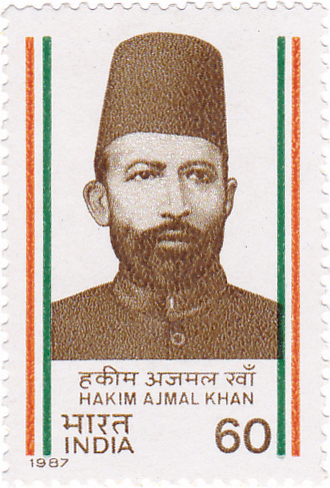
Hakim Ajmal Khan on a 1987 postage stamp of India

Before he died of heart problems on 29 December 1927, Hakim Ajmal Khan had renounced his government title, and many of his Indian followers awarded him the title of Masih-ul-Mulk (Healer of the Nation). Mukhtar Ahmed Ansari succeeded him as the Jamia Millia Islamia chancellor.

Ajmaline, a class Ia antiarrhythmic agent, and Ajmalan, a parent hydride, are named after him.

After the partition of India, Khan's grandson Hakim Muhammad Nabi Khan moved to Pakistan. Hakim Nabi had learnt Tibb (the practice of medicine) from his grandfather and opened 'Dawakhana Hakim Ajmal Khan' in Lahore which has branches throughout Pakistan. The motto of the Ajmal Khan family is Azal-ul-Allah-Khudatulmal, which means that the best way to keep oneself busy is by serving humanity.

He is buried near Tibbia College Karol Bagh in Delhi where other members of his family were also buried. The current location is near RK Ashram Metro Station.

== Quotes ==
- "The spirit of non-cooperation pervades throughout the country and there is no true Indian heart even in the remotest corner of this great country which is not filled with the spirit of cheerful suffering and sacrifice to attain Swaraj and see the Punjab and the Khilafat wrongs redressed." – From the Presidential Address, Indian National Congress, 1921 Session, Ahmedabad.

== See also ==
- Ajmal Khan Park, Delhi, adjacent to Tibbia College was named after him
