= Hakim Muhammad Sharif Khan =

Indian physician

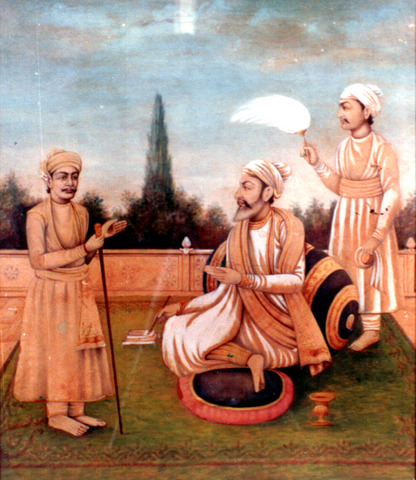
- Hakim Sharif, probably during his days as Royal Hakim to the Mughal emperor.
- Born: 1724; Delhi, Delhi Subah, Mughal Empire
- Died: 1807 (aged 82–83); Delhi, Mughal Empire
- Education: Naqshbandi Madrasa, Delhi
- Known for: Prominent member of the Delhi School of Unani medicine Royal physician to Mughal emperor Shah Alam II
- Title: Ashraf-ul-Hukma
- Children: Hakim Sadiq Ali Khan
- Relatives: Hakim Ajmal Khan (great-grandson)

Hakim Muhammad Sharif Khan (1724 – 1807) was a Sunni Muslim Hakim (physician in Unani / Greek medicine) of some importance in Mughal India at the end of 18th century.

== Early life and career ==
Muhammad Sharif Khan was born in 1724 in Delhi. His ancestors arrived in India from modern day Uzbekistan during the time of Mughal emperor Babur (ruled 1526 – 1530). Muhammad Sharif Khan studied at a madrasa in Delhi that was run by the sons of eminent religious scholar of the Naqshbandi order Shah Waliullah Dehlawi. He was the royal Hakim at the court of Mughal emperor Shah Alam II (ruled 1759-1806) who gave him the title Ashraf-al-Hukma (The Best of Physicians). Hakim Muhammad Sharif Khan also possibly treated this emperor's son Akbar II (ruled 1806-1837).

== Achievements ==
Since Hakim Sharif was based in Delhi, his family of hakims, the "Sharifi family", came to be recognised as the Delhi school of Hakims.

Muhammad Sharif Khan came from a "a family of theologians and physicians", and ultimately descended from Ubayd-Allah Mahmud Ahrar (died 1490), "an influential Sufi Shaikh of the Naqshbandi order in Transoxiana".

He was a prolific writer, and wrote some seventeen books on medicine, of which the most famous was "Elaaj al-Amraaz", (The Cures for Diseases) which is still considered a great source of reference in the field. He is also famous for compiling the most complete and authoritative collection of Unani medicinal formulas into one master work.

He also translated the Quran into Urdu, which is widely regarded as the first translation of the Qur'an into that language.

He was responsible for introducing aspects of European science in Unani medicine during that period, and he also composed works in Persian, as well as in Arabic, including a dictionary of Indian drugs.

He is the great-grandfather of Hakim Ajmal Khan, a renowned hakim, scholar, and politician of his time in British India.

== Death ==
Hakim Muhammad Sharif Khan died in 1807 and was buried close to the tomb of Sufi Qutbuddin Bakhtiar Kaki in Delhi, India.

== Sources ==
- Speziale, Fabrizio (2009). "ŠARIF KHAN, Moḥammad". Encyclopaedia Iranica.
