= Thallane =

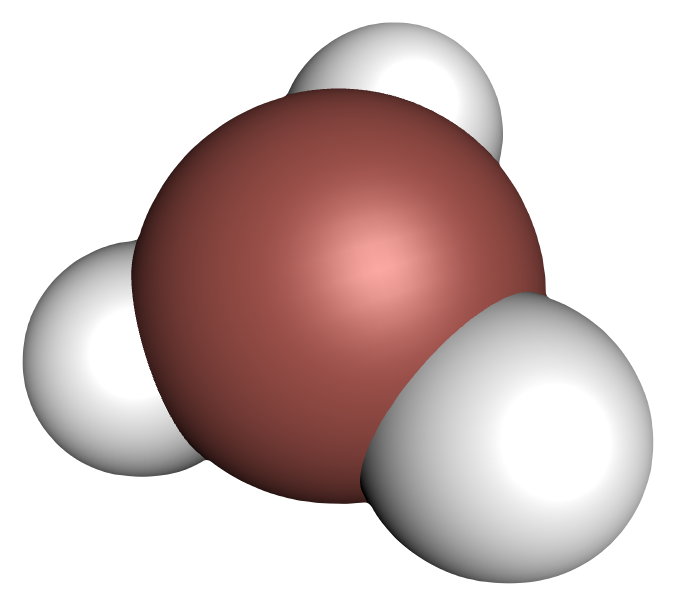

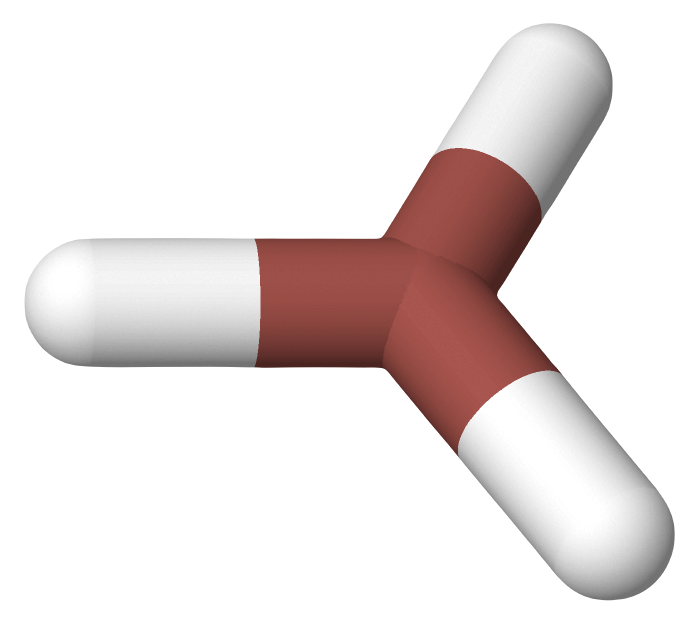

Names
- IUPAC name Thallane
- Systematic IUPAC name Thallane (substitutive); Trihydridothallium (additive)
- Other names Thallium hydride Thallium trihydride Hydrogen thallide

Identifiers
CAS Number	82391-14-8
3D model (JSmol)	Interactive image
ChEBI	CHEBI:30437
ChemSpider	123171
Gmelin Reference	362119
PubChem CID	139662
CompTox Dashboard (EPA)	DTXSID101336110
- InChI: InChI=1S/Tl.3H Key: NWUWMQRSDSSETA-UHFFFAOYSA-N
- SMILES: [TlH3]

Properties
Chemical formula	TlH_{3}
Molar mass	207.4071 g mol^{−1}
- Except where otherwise noted, data are given for materials in their standard state (at 25 °C [77 °F], 100 kPa). Infobox references

Thallane (systematically named trihydridothallium) is an inorganic compound with the empirical chemical formula TlH_{3}. It has not yet been obtained in bulk, hence its bulk properties remain unknown. However, molecular thallane has been isolated in solid gas matrices. Thallane is mainly produced for academic purposes.

TlH_{3} is the simplest thallane. Thallium is the heaviest stable member of the group 13 metals; the stability of group 13 hydrides decreases with increasing periodic number. This is commonly attributed to poor overlap of the metal valence orbitals with that of the 1s orbital of hydrogen. Despite encouraging early reports, it is unlikely that a thallane species has been isolated. Thallanes have been observed only in matrix isolation studies; the infrared spectrum was obtained in the gas phase by laser ablation of thallium in the presence of hydrogen gas. This study confirmed aspects of ab initio calculations conducted by Schwerdtfeger which indicated the similar stability of thallium and indiganes. There has not been a confirmed isolation of a thallium hydride complex to date.

== History ==
In 2004, American chemist Lester Andrews synthesised thallane for the first time. This reaction sequence consisted of atomisation of thallium, followed by cryogenic co-deposition with hydrogen, and concluded with shortwave ultraviolet irradiation.
