= Indium trihydride =

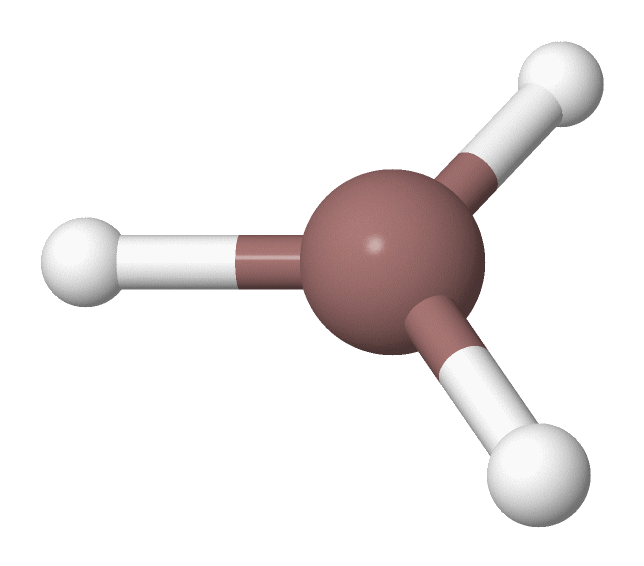

Names
- Systematic IUPAC name Indigane (substitutive); Trihydridoindium (additive)
- Other names Indium(III) hydride Indium trihydride

Identifiers
CAS Number	7440-74-6
3D model (JSmol)	Interactive image
ChEBI	CHEBI:30429
ChemSpider	22435
Gmelin Reference	163932
PubChem CID	24000
UNII	045A6V3VFX
- InChI: InChI=1S/In.3H Key: CXQHBGCUHODCNP-UHFFFAOYSA-N
- SMILES: [InH3]

Properties
Chemical formula	InH_{3}
Molar mass	117.842 g/mol
Melting point	−90 °C (−130 °F; 183 K) (decomposes)

Structure
Coordination geometry	Trigonal planar
Molecular shape	Dihedral

Related compounds
Related metallanes	Aluminium hydride; Borane; Hydrogen iodide; Hydrogen telluride; Rubidium hydride; Stannane; Stibine
- Except where otherwise noted, data are given for materials in their standard state (at 25 °C [77 °F], 100 kPa). verify (what is ?) Infobox references

Indium trihydride is an inorganic compound with the chemical formula (InH_{3}). It has been observed in matrix isolation and laser ablation experiments. Gas phase stability has been predicted. The infrared spectrum was obtained in the gas phase by laser ablation of indium in presence of hydrogen gas. InH_{3} is of no practical importance.

== Chemical properties ==
Solid InH_{3} is a three-dimensional network polymeric structure, where In atoms are connected by In-H-In bridging bonds, is suggested to account for the growth of broad infrared bands when samples of InH_{3} and InD_{3} produced on a solid hydrogen matrix are warmed. Such a structure is known for solid AlH_{3}. When heated above −90 °C, indium trihydride decomposes to produce indium–hydrogen alloy and elemental hydrogen. As of 2013, the only known method of synthesising indium trihydride is the autopolymerisation of indane below −90 °C.

== Other indium hydrides ==
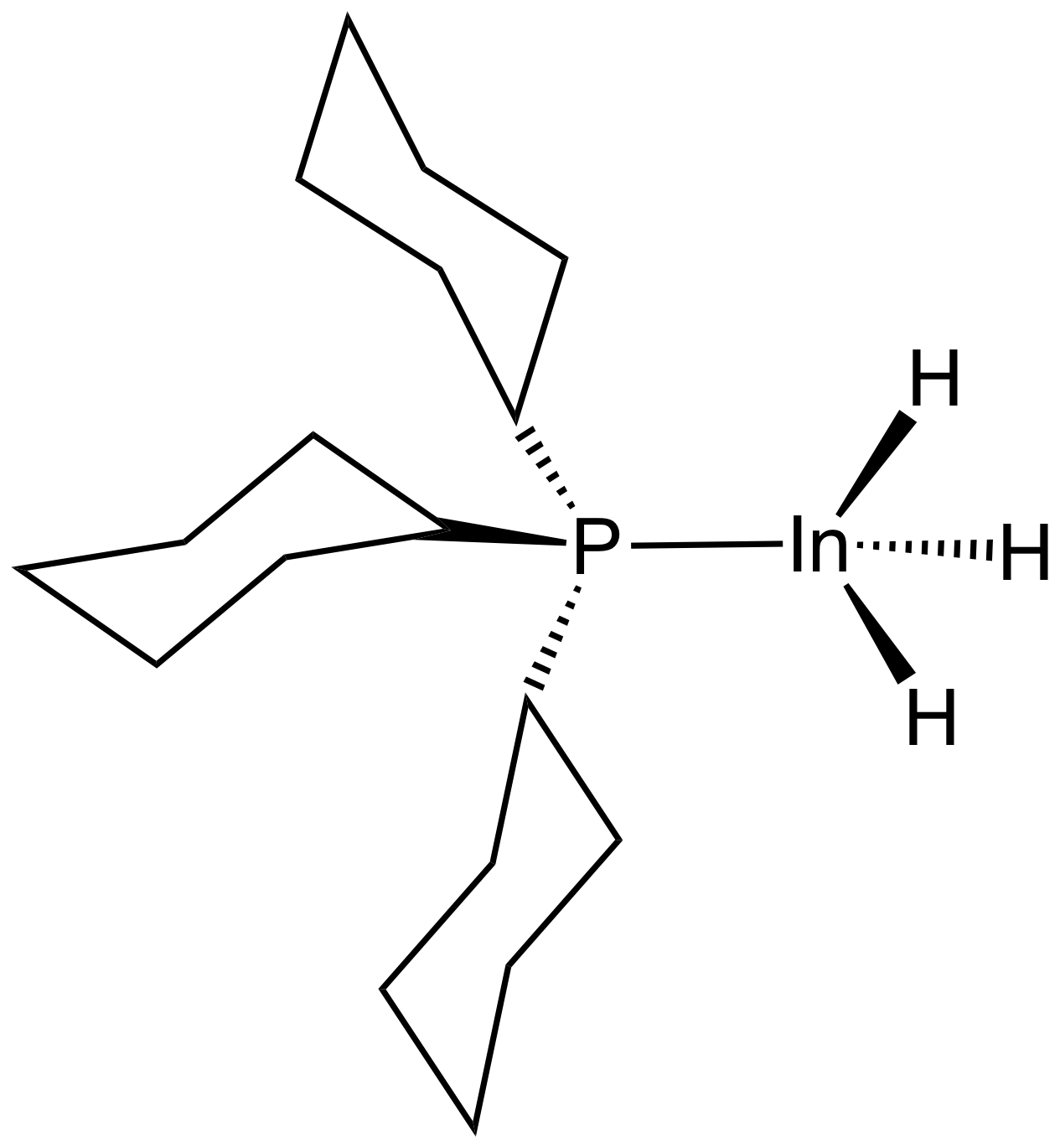
Structure of the adduct of InH_{3} and tricyclohexylphosphine.

Several compounds with In-H bonds have been reported. Examples of complexes with two hydride ligands replaced by other ligands are (K^{+})_{3}[K((CH_{3})_{2}SiO)_{7}]^{+}([InH(CH_{2}C(CH_{3})_{3})_{3}]^{−})_{4} and HIn(−C_{6}H_{4}−ortho-CH_{2}N(CH_{3})_{2})_{2}.

Although InH_{3} is labile, adducts are known with the stoichiometry InH_{3}L_{n} (n = 1 or 2). 1:1 amine adducts are made by the reaction of Li^{+}[InH_{4}]^{−} (lithium tetrahydridoindate(III)) with a trialkylammonium salt. The trimethylamine complex is only stable below −30 °C or in dilute solution. The 1:1 and 1:2 complexes with tricyclohexylphosphine (PCy_{3}) have been characterised crystallographically. The average In-H bond length is 168 pm. Indium hydride is also known to form adducts with NHCs.
