= Theft of Philippe Pétain's coffin =

Theft of Phillipe Petain's coffin by a commando of six men

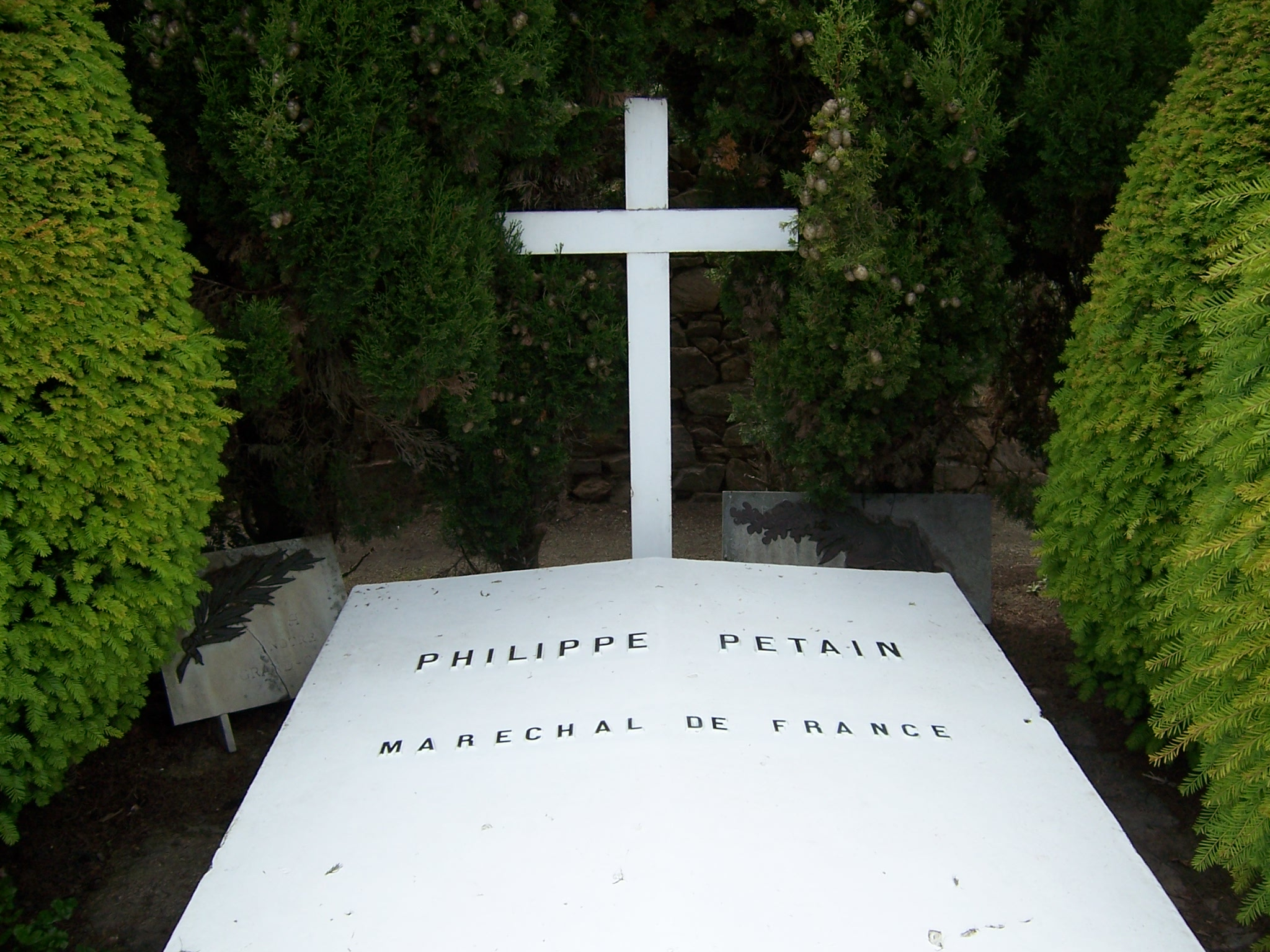
Philippe Pétain's tomb (in 2008) is a simple white granite slab topped by a wooden cross and surrounded by cypress and yew trees. (Note: This granite has been repainted white to hide damage, as the grave is vandalized once or twice a year. "La tombe du maréchal Pétain vandalisée à l'île d'Yeu". Lemonde. November 13, 2018.)

Philippe Pétain's coffin was stolen from the Port-Joinville cemetery on the French Atlantic coast Île d'Yeu on the night of February 18–19, 1973. The operation, carried out by a commando of six men close to the extreme right, was intended to transfer the Marshal's remains to the ossuary at Douaumont, near Verdun, as a sort of "rehabilitation" for Philippe Pétain's supporters. The "mastermind" of the operation was far-right lawyer and politician Jean-Louis Tixier-Vignancour. One of his close friends, Hubert Massol, was put in charge of the project, heading a team he formed with five other people.

A number of incidents led to the failure of the operation, with the coffin being found three days later in the Paris suburbs, and the main protagonists arrested. The coffin was reburied in the Port-Joinville cemetery on February 22. For three days, the case made the headlines in the French media and mobilized the authorities and police.

== Context ==
On August 15, 1945, at the end of his trial, Marshal Philippe Pétain was sentenced to death and indignité nationale. General de Gaulle commuted his sentence to life imprisonment two days later. Pétain was first interned at Fort du Portalet in the Pyrenees, then transferred on November 16, 1945 to Fort de la Citadelle in the commune of L'Île-d'Yeu. On June 29, 1951, in view of his poor health, he was placed under house arrest in Paul Luco's private home (now an annex of the Nantes military hospital) in Port-Joinville, the commune's main town. He died there a month later, on July 23, 1951, and was buried the following day in the commune's cemetery, opposite the line of white sailors' graves.

In 1938, in his will, Pétain expressed his wish to be buried in Verdun. After his death, the Association for the Defence of the Memory of Marshal Pétain (ADMP) regularly called for his remains to be transferred to Verdun, in the name of "national reconciliation". The ADMP organized a petition in May 1954, supported by numerous World War I veterans' associations, which attracted almost 70,000 signatures. This request was systematically refused by successive French governments. According to Henry Rousso's analysis, this request for the remains to be translated aims to "make people forget the Marshal of 1940 in favor of the General of 1916, to use the memory of the veterans of the Great War, for whom Pétain remained the man who said "We'll get them", for the benefit of an ideology".

== The operation ==
Jean-Louis Tixier-Vignancour went to île d'Yeu in January 1973 to do some initial scouting, in particular to find out about the constraints of the "La Vendée" ferry timetable, linked to tide times. He set up the operation with Hubert Massol, one of his deputies at the Alliance républicaine pour les libertés et le progrès (ARLP), the political party he headed. Massol recruited a team of four people, who were joined by a funeral craftsman from the Thiais cemetery in Paris, an acquaintance of Tixier-Vignancour's wife, who was to help open and close the grave.

The date chosen was the night of February 18 to 19, a few weeks before the March legislative elections, to maximize the impact of the operation and put pressure on the powers that be to relocate Pétain's remains. Tixier-Vignancour and Massol also wanted the operation to take place before February 21, the anniversary of the start of the Battle of Verdun.

Renault Estafette with raised roof, similar to the one used by the commando.

On the previous Friday, February 16, an accomplice, Solange Boche, a shopkeeper from Essonne, and Armand Garau, one of the commando members posing as her husband, travelled to the island in a rented van, a Renault Estafette registered in Hauts-de-Seine, on the ferry that links the island with the mainland. The cover for this trip was the sale of clothes at the market held in Port-Joinville over the weekend. On Sunday, the other five members arrived on the island by ferry as mere passengers, leaving their vehicles in the port of Fromentine, on the Vendée coast, while the shopkeeper discreetly returned to the mainland without the van, but accompanied by Pierre Garau. Once on the mainland, Garau dropped her off at the train station before returning to the island. The commando stayed at the Hôtel des Voyageurs, run by Gilles Noleau, a Pétainist who Tixier-Vignancour had met on his visit in January. It was in this hotel that Annie Pétain was staying while her husband was in prison, as the Marshal's wife had daily visiting rights.

A few hours after their arrival, at around 2 a.m. on the night of Sunday 18th to Monday 19th, the six men led by Hubert Massol drove the Renault Estafette into the Port-Joinville cemetery. In barely half an hour, they opened Marshal Pétain's grave and stole the coffin containing his corpse. The tombstone was put back in place, the joints redone and the surrounding area raked to remove the many footprints and cement splinters left by the opening of the grave. The coffin, surprisingly well preserved after more than twenty years, was loaded into the estafette, which was pushed out of the cemetery, engine off, to avoid making any noise (the Gendarmerie is right next door, and some of its windows overlook the graves). The team returned to the hotel, where they drank champagne with the manager. An hour later, at 4 a.m., they embarked with the van on the ferry, which left the port at high tide half an hour later. Arriving at the port of Fromentine, some of the commando members climbed into the car they had left the day before to board the ferry, and the two vehicles set off.

That same day, at around 9 a.m., municipal employee Jean Taraud made his daily rounds and visited Marshal Pétain's grave to check on its condition after the weekend's visits. (Note: A soccer match with a team from the continent took place at the weekend, and Jean Taraud knew that some of the players took the opportunity to visit the marshal's grave) He noticed that the area around the grave was surprisingly clean, but above all that the joints of the tombstone were fresh. He immediately notified the gendarmes. They alerted the Vendée prefect and the public prosecutor, who in turn informed the Minister of the Interior, Raymond Marcellin. Accompanied by an examining magistrate from Sables-d'Olonne, the prefect and the public prosecutor set off for Ile d'Yeu (as the next ferry was too late due to the tide, a helicopter was made available). Once there, they had the marshal's tomb opened: the flight was then established. One of the first leads was that a team from Franco's Spain had boarded a ship to recover the coffin. In fact, Michel Dumas had used Spanish newspapers, found by chance in the van, to fill in the hole made by the percussion of the crowbar when opening the coffin, for lack of sufficient cement. This seemed a credible lead to investigators, given that Spain was still home to former French collaborators such as Louis Darquier de Pellepoix and former Belgian fascist leader Léon Degrelle, who had once promised to "go and liberate Marshal Pétain".

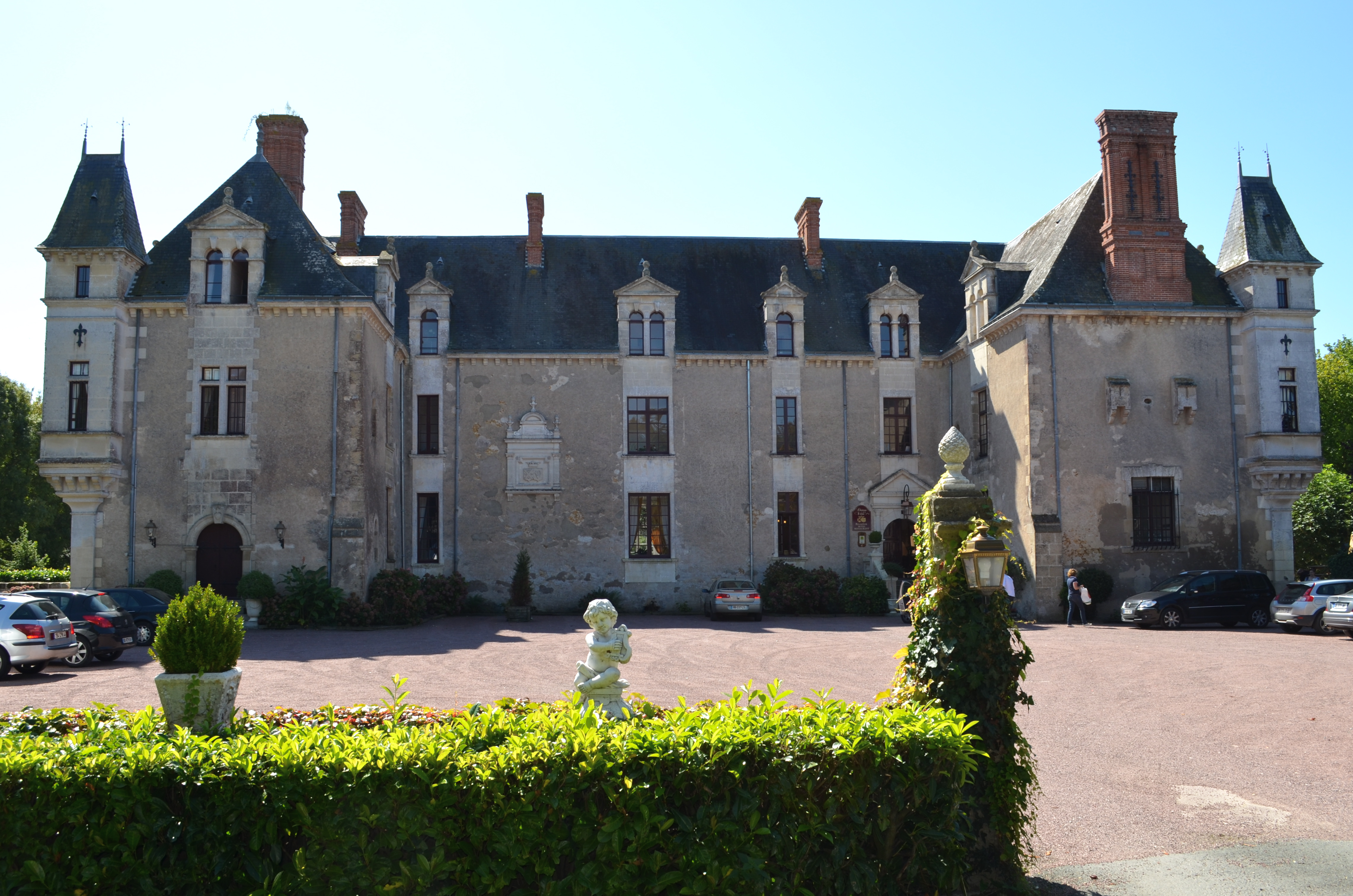
Château de la Vérie (photo 2011), where the commando stopped.

During the morning, the commando stopped off near Challans in the Vendée, at the Château de la Vérie belonging to François Boux de Casson (deputy for the Vendée between the wars, François Boux de Casson was a departmental delegate for information under the Vichy regime). According to Massol, it was agreed with him that the commando could stop off there to rest. According to journalist Jacques Derogy, the commando was also to transfer the coffin to another vehicle. However, no one was there, and after waiting for three hours, the commando set off again. At midday, the six men stopped for lunch at a roadside restaurant, where they learned over the radio that the coffin abduction had been discovered. In less than ten hours, they were aware of the misdeed. They decided to abandon their original destination, Verdun, as too risky, and headed for Paris, which they reached that afternoon.

After symbolically taking the coffin down the Avenue des Champs-Élysées, the commando split up. The van was parked on boulevard Raspail and Hubert Massol, accompanied by Michel Dumas, went to see Tixier-Vignancour, noting that his home was already under police surveillance. The coffin was then transferred to another vehicle in Armand Garau's garage, and Massol went alone to hide the coffin in a cubicle at 30, avenue Gabriel-Péri, near Saint-Ouen in the Paris suburbs.

== Arrest of the commando and location of the coffin ==
The affair made the headlines in the press and on radio and television. Not wanting this sensitive affair to pollute the election campaign, the authorities pulled out all the stops to resolve it as quickly as possible. The Minister of the Interior, campaigning in his Morbihan constituency, was rushed back to Paris. Border surveillance was stepped up. Fearing that the coffin might be secretly buried in Verdun, gendarmerie roadblocks were set up in the region and the Douaumont necropolis was monitored. (Note: At the Douaumont military cemetery, gendarmes checked the identity of anyone approaching General Anselin's grave (mainly journalists), Pétain having declared during a visit in 1934 that he wished to be buried there. General Anselin's remains were transferred there in 1948 from a small temporary cemetery near Douaumont, where he had been buried in 1916.) In Paris, police disguised as tourists even guarded the tomb of the Unknown Soldier under the Arc de Triomphe. The media put forward various hypotheses: provocation by the extreme left or an operation by Pétain nostalgics, but in extreme right-wing circles, the rumor was that it was a Tixier-Vignancour coup.

As the investigation progressed, police were able to identify the van on the basis of a list of vehicles that had taken the ferry. It had been rented in Puteaux, Hauts-de-Seine, with a stolen license, but on the ferry, it had taken the place reserved for another van, registered in Essonne. The police then managed to trace the car back to the shopkeeper, who was arrested at her home in Étréchy. When questioned, she finally admitted that she had indeed gone to the island to sell clothes with a fairground friend, Armand Garau. Her van had broken down, so Garau's son, Pierre Garau, rented one for them, but she said she didn't know the names of the other members of the commando. Pierre Garau was located and arrested by the police, but his father had fled. The rental van was found in the 16th arrondissement of Paris, at the corner of avenue du Général-Mangin and avenue de Lamballe, but it only contained equipment for selling at markets. The funeral craftsman was also arrested.

Jacques Isorni, Pétain's lawyer at his trial, suspected it was a plot by his "rival" Jean-Louis Tixier-Vignancour. He visited him at the Paris courthouse and, in a heated discussion, tried to convince him to put a stop to the operation. In the end, they agreed on an honorable way out: to obtain a temporary burial at Les Invalides, while the President of the Republic, Georges Pompidou, decided on a burial at Douaumont.

Late afternoon on Wednesday February 21, Hubert Massol discreetly met up with Tixier-Vignancour at the courthouse. Knowing they were being watched, they decided to get it over with: Massol would denounce himself, but without implicating Tixer-Vignancour, who would defend him at his trial and use the occasion to reopen the Marshal's case. Massol immediately called journalists to an impromptu press conference at the Café Cristal on Avenue de la Grande-Armée for 6 p.m., during which he indicated that he was prepared to reveal the whereabouts of the coffin if he received a written undertaking from the President of the Republic that the coffin would be deposited at Les Invalides pending its transfer to Douaumont. Shortly afterwards, the police burst into the café and arrested Massol. After being questioned, he finally agreed to tell the police the address of the cubicle if he was accompanied by journalists and photographers, which the Minister of the Interior, who had been consulted, agreed to do. The coffin was found in Saint-Ouen shortly after midnight on Thursday February 22, just three days after his abduction.

== Re-burial on Île d'Yeu ==
The coffin was immediately taken by ambulance to the church of the Val-de-Grâce military hospital, where it was placed in an apse, covered with the tricolor flag and watched over overnight by some twenty mobile guards. In the morning, at 8:30 a.m., in the presence of the Paris Police Prefect, he was flown to the Villacoublay air base and taken by military aircraft and then by Puma helicopter to the Ile d'Yeu. After a brief religious ceremony at the Notre-Dame-du-Port church in Port-Joinville, the coffin was placed back in its grave in the presence of the Vendée prefect, the public prosecutor, the examining magistrate, veterans and a crowd of curious onlookers and journalists.

French President Georges Pompidou sent flowers, which were laid on the grave during the re-interment.

== Aftermath ==
During those few days, the affair took on the magnitude of an affair of state, contrasting with the apparent amateurism of the operation.

The few members of the commando group arrested were briefly incarcerated in La Santé prison. The examining magistrate Louis Calvet to whom they were presented in Sables-d'Olonne on February 24 charged them, along with François Boux de Casson, but released them the same day. Jean-Louis Tixier-Vignancour, who had not been implicated by the members of the commando and for lack of evidence, was not questioned (he even claimed in a subsequent television interview that he could never have imagined that Hubert Massol was involved in the affair). The members of the commando were never brought to trial. In fact, no investigation or trial took place in the months that followed. According to historian Jean-Yves Le Naour, neither the judiciary nor the government wanted a trial that risked becoming political and giving a platform to Tixier-Vignancour. A year later, Valéry Giscard d'Estaing declared a collective presidential amnesty for political offenses, following his election as President of France in May 1974. In July 1975, the examining magistrate dismissed the case under this amnesty.

== The commando ==
The "commando" who removed the coffin was made up of six people:

- Hubert Massol (b. 1937), who recruited and led the commando. As a young man, he spent almost three years fighting in Algeria, before embarking on a career in advertising on his return. At the same time, he got involved in politics, joining the Alliance républicaine pour les libertés et le progrès (ARLP), Tixier-Vignancour's party, of which he became one of the main collaborators, and for which he had already done a few stints (before the Yeu operation, he was under investigation for assault and battery against a former ARLP leader, who had split and set up his own party). Massol indicated that he had chosen Tixier-Vignancour's party rather than another nationalist party because its program included the transfer of Pétain's remains to Douaumont. Chosen as a candidate for the ARLP in the March 1973 legislative elections for the 29th district of Paris in the 19th arrondissement, he withdrew following the affair. He then chaired the Association nationale Pétain-Verdun (until 1982), and was active in the National Rally, then the National Republican Movement (MNR). He was a candidate in the legislative elections in Hauts-de-Seine, in the cantonal elections in the canton of Asnières-sur-Seine-Nord, and was elected municipal councillor of Asnières-sur-Seine. Between 2009 and 2020, he was president of the Association for the Defence of the Memory of Marshal Pétain (ADMP);
- a former Hungarian legionnaire;
- a Polish anti-communist and refugee in France, also a former legionnaire;
- Pierre Garau, 40, a former paratrooper;
- Armand Garau, 61 or 65 years old, the father of the previous owner, a former soldier and Parisian mechanic. He drove the van. On the run after the arrest of his son and other members of the commando, he appeared a few days later before the examining magistrate in Les Sables-d'Olonne;
- Michel Dumas (1932–2015), a professional marble mason, was responsible for opening and closing the tomb. Tixier-Vignancour is said to have known him through his wife, who regularly visited the grave of her housekeeper buried in the Parisian cemetery of Thiais, and became friends with him. On the way to Paris, in the van, he engraved his initials "MD" on the coffin with his laguiole. During his interrogation at the Quai des Orfèvres, the police confounded him by showing him one of the four postcards he had sent from the Ile d'Yeu. In 2004, he published La Permission du maréchal: trois jours en maraude avec le cercueil de Pétain, a book recounting the operation. (Note: The title of Michel Dumas's book, ''La Permission du maréchal'', was inspired by a letter Tixier-Vignancour wrote to him after the affair, in which he wrote: You offered the conqueror of Verdun a three-day leave.)

Other people were also involved in the operation:

- Jean-Louis Tixier-Vignancour (1907–1989), renowned lawyer and figurehead of the French far right, the mastermind of the operation, but not prosecuted for lack of evidence;
- Gilles Noleau, owner of the Hôtel des Voyageurs in Port-Joinville. He welcomed the members of the commando team on the Sunday afternoon before the operation (showing them around the small private museum created in his hotel in honor of the Marshal) and again a few hours after the operation, before they boarded the ferry again at 4 a.m.;
- Solange Boche, 38, the shopkeeper from the Paris suburbs who used her alibi to bring a van to the island, was the first to be arrested;
- François Boux de Casson (1908–1981), deputy mayor of Challans and Conservative deputy for Vendée between the wars, he was departmental delegate for information under the Vichy regime. The Château de la Vérie, near Challans, belonged to his family since the early 19th century. According to Hubert Massol, Boux de Casson agreed to let the commando make a stopover at his château, enthusiastically declaring that "his château was historic because it had welcomed Richelieu, and that it would be doubly historic by welcoming Pétain and that he was very honored by it". He reportedly took fright and left for Paris by train the day before, without informing Massol. For his part, Boux de Casson denied ever having been aware of the operation.

In all, six people were charged with grave robbery: Hubert Massol, Pierre and Armand Garau, Michel Dumas, Solange Boche and François Boux de Casson.

The main judicial, police and administrative figures in charge of the case were:

- Louis Calvet, examining magistrate in Sables-d'Olonne;
- Roger Hauret (1919–2015), public prosecutor in Les Sables-d'Olonne; in 1980, while public prosecutor in Angoulême, he was in charge of the judicial investigation into the kidnapping of industrialist Michel Maury-Laribière;
- Roger Ninin (1919–2004), Prefect of Vendée. Appointed Prefect of Ain department in 1975, then préfet hors cadre in 1979;
- Jacques Lenoir (1918–2008), Prefect of the Paris Police. A former member of the Resistance and director of the Renseignements Généraux, he later became director of the Police Nationale;
- Roger Poiblanc (1921–2011), police commissioner at 36, quai des Orfèvres, in charge of the Paris investigation. He had already been involved in or in charge of several famous criminal cases, including the Petit-Clamart attack on General De Gaulle (1962), the arrest of the murderer Lucien Léger (1964) and the kidnapping of Ben Barka (1965). In 1976, he was put in charge of the investigation into the assassination of Prince Jean de Broglie and, in 1978, the kidnapping of Baron Empain.

== Bibliography ==
- Cédric Condom (director); Jean-Yves Le Naour (scriptwriter) (2012). On a volé le maréchal [We stole the marshal] (DVD) (in French).
- Dumas, Michel (2004). La Permission du maréchal: Trois jours en maraude avec le cercueil de Pétain (in French). Paris: Albin-Michel. ISBN 2-226-15130-3.
- Heitz, Bruno (2014). J’ai pas volé Pétain mais presque, le cercueil baladeur. Bayou (in French). Paris: Éditions Gallimard. ISBN 978-2-07-065569-4.: a comic strip freely inspired by the case.
- Le Naour, Jean-Yves (2009). On a volé le Maréchal (in French). Paris: Larousse. ISBN 978-2-03-584838-3.
- Jean-Yves, Le Naour (November 2012). "Pétain bouge encore". L'Histoire (in French) (381): 30–31.
