= François Boux de Casson =

French politician (1908–1981)

- Born: 24 February 1908; Vannes, Morbihan, France
- Died: 31 January 1981 (aged 72); Paris, France
- Occupations: Landowner, politician
- Political party: Republican Federation

François Boux de Casson (24 February 1908 – 31 January 1981) was a French aristocrat, landowner and right-wing politician. He served as a member of the Chamber of Deputies from 1936 to 1940, representing Les Sables-d'Olonne in the Vendée.

== Early life ==
François Boux de Casson was born on 24 February 1908 in Vannes, Morbihan, France.

== Career ==
Boux de Casson inherited an estate in Challans, where he became a landowner.

Boux de Casson joined the Republican Federation, a conservative political party. He was a supporter of Colonel François de La Rocque, and he joined his Croix-de-Feu. He was elected as deputy mayor of Challans in 1935. He succeeded Charles Gallet as a member of the Chamber of Deputies from 1936 to 1942, where he represented the second district of Vendée (Les Sables-d'Olonne).

Boux de Casson lost a bid in the primary of the 1951 election for the National Assembly. He was elected as a member of the canton of Challans in 1955 and its city council in 1958. He lost two additional bids for the National Assembly, in 1956 and 1958. He became associated with Pierre Poujade and Jacques Isorni.

In 1973, he was charged with conspiring to remove Marshal Philippe Pétain's coffin from the Île d'Yeu, with the aim of burying him at the Douaumont Ossuary, the traditional burial ground for veterans of the Battle of Verdun. However, he was acquitted.

Boux de Casson served as the president of the Société des Courses, an equine society, and the Comité de la Foire-Exposition in Challans.

== Death ==
Boux de Casson died on 31 January 1981 in Paris.
