= HGH (disambiguation) =

HGH stands for human growth hormone.

HGH may also refer to:

- Atlantic Air Lift, a French airline
- Hamilton General Hospital, in Ontario, Canada
- Hangzhou Xiaoshan International Airport, in Zhejiang Province, China
- Telegram code for Hangzhou East Railway Station
- Mercury(I) hydride (HgH)
- High Street railway station, New South Wales, Australia
- Helmholtz-Gymnasium Heidelberg, a German secondary school
