= Atlantic Air Lift =

French regional airline

Atlantic Airlift
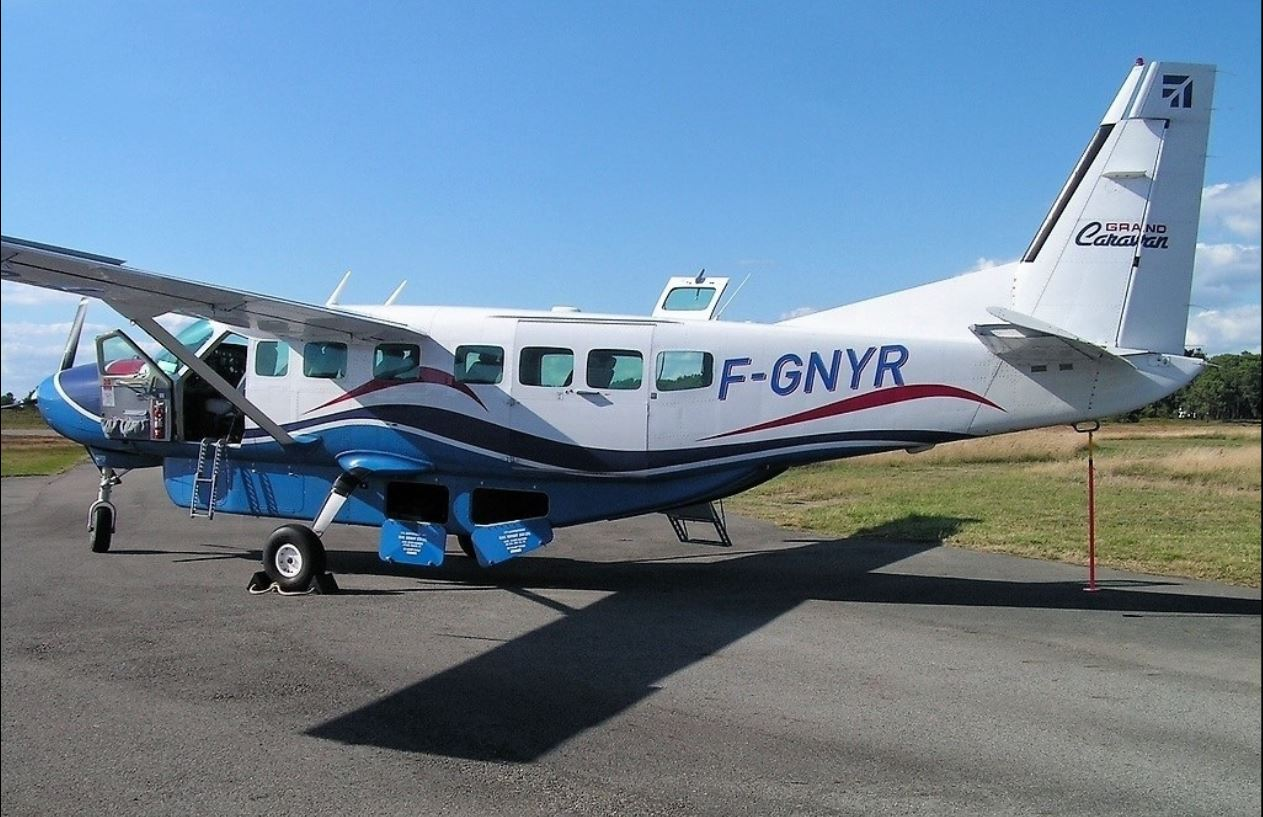
- Cessna 208B Grand Caravan
IATA	ICAO	Call sign
—	HGH	HIGHER
- Founded: 2005
- Fleet size: 1
- Destinations: 2
- Headquarters: Nantes, France

Atlantic Airlift was a French regional airline. It provided the only scheduled service to the Île d'Yeu Aerodrome, on the Île d'Yeu off the west coast of France. The service linked the Île d'Yeu with Nantes Atlantique Airport. The airline made its first flight in April 2005. It operated two daily return flights, using a nine-seat Cessna 208B Grand Caravan. The airline ceased operations after a few months confirming how difficult it was to fly to Île d'Yeu on a permanent basis.
