= Pauline de Lézardière =

French historian (1754–1835)

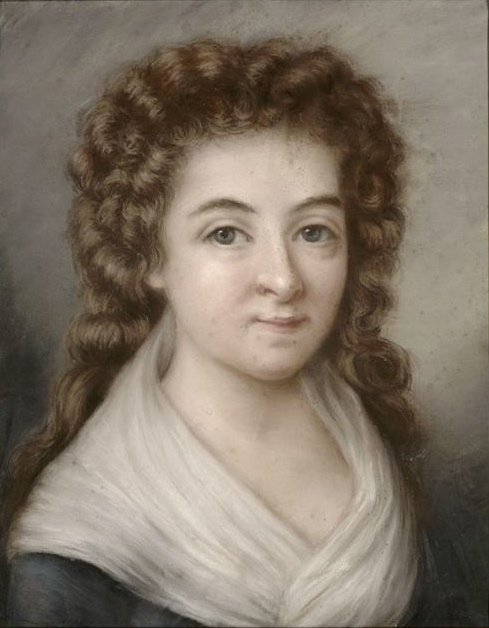
- Born: Marie-Charlotte-Pauline Robert de Lézardière; 25 March 1754; Challans, France
- Died: 8 February 1835 (aged 80); Poiroux, France
- Occupation: Historian
- Known for: Compendium of French Law
- Parents: Louis-Jacques-Gilbert Robert de Lézardière (father); Charlotte Babaud de la Chaussade (mother)

Marie-Charlotte-Pauline Robert de Lézardière, commonly known as Pauline de Lézardière, was a French historian who was born on 25 March 1754 at the Château de la Vérie (Challans) and died on 8 February 1835 at the Château de la Proustière (Poiroux). She remains best known for her multivolume history of French law.

== Biography ==
Pauline was born in Challans, in France's Loire valley. Her father was Baron Louis-Jacques-Gilbert Robert de Lézardière and her mother was Charlotte Babaud de la Chaussade (who, in turn, was the daughter of Jean Babaud). Pauline's brothers included the Marquis Jacques Paul Toussaint Robert de Lézardière, Charles de La Lézardière, Joseph-Alexis Robert de La Lézardière and Jacques-Augustin Robert de Lézardière.

Her father was well-versed in public affairs and history, interests that he passed on to his children. The Baron arranged a good education for them in Latin, history and geography, surely intended for his sons, but available to his daughter as well. Thus, even as a child, Pauline acquired a scholarly awareness that made her writings about the history of French laws possible.

=== Inspiration ===
After she learned about the famous failure of Maupeou's Reform in 1771 at the age of 17, she was inspired to begin documenting the evolution of French constitutional laws from ancient times. (Maupeou, the chancellor of France, was trying to support the troubled royal authority by destroying the system of French parlements, which had become powerful regional courts.)

The vast empire of Charles the Bald (also known as Charles II, Holy Roman Emperor) in the year 836, shown in orange.

The result of Lézardière's project was her unfinished eight-volume tome, Théorie des loix politiques de la monarchie française (Theory of political laws of the French monarchy). In it, she described laws from three historical periods: 1) imperial law before Clovis I, first king of the Franks; 2) legislation by popular consensus from Clovis to Charles the Bald, who was king of France and Holy Roman Emperor in the 9th century and grandson of Charlemagne; and 3) feudal customs up to the 14th century. She had planned a fourth section describing the evolution of laws through the French Revolution but never finished it.

Writing about Théorie, Armenteros says,

"Its goal was to teach French people the historic rights and liberties that the parlements defended, and that lay embedded within the French constitution: for it was only ignorance, Lézardière believed, that caused the French to submit to tyranny, and that prevented the monarchy from becoming the full haven of liberty that its barbarian creators had once intended it to become. That opinion was of course widespread among Enlightened littérateurs. Lézardière’s family sent the Théorie to Louis XVI [in 1778] along with her other legal compositions, but the text did not appear in print before 1791. In that year, the king ordered the first volumes published under the supervision of his loyal minister Chrétien de Malesherbes (1721–1794) in a last-ditch attempt to justify the monarchy."

The attempt failed. The French Revolution continued and rioters pillaged the royal press after only a few copies of Lézardière's works had been distributed. Most were destroyed.

=== French Revolution ===
With the French Revolution's Reign of Terror sweeping the country, the Lézardières suffered greatly. One brother, clergyman Jacques-Augustin was executed, and the family fled France seeking safety. The family's chateau, notably the Baron's library containing 20 years of Pauline's research, manuscripts and notes, was set on fire in 1791. Two more brothers were executed before the end of the Terror. But even during her exile, Lézardière continued to study history by visiting the library in Brussels to read works by Machiavelli.

In 1801, after peace became the norm, Lézardière returned to France's Loire Valley, this time to the Château de la Proustière, to live with her brother Joseph. She did not return to her unfinished Théorie but instead wrote about a variety of historical subjects, hoping the new royal constitution enacted by the king, Louis XVIII in 1814, would result in the continuation of "the two objects of her cult, monarchy and liberty."

=== Final years ===
Lézardière wrote almost until her death at the age of 80, on 8 February 1835. Théorie was finally published in eight volumes by her brother Charles in 1844, almost a decade after she died. Most of her later work remained unpublished until 1927 when Carcassonne brought them to the attention of historians.

== Historical notes ==
- According to Armenteros, "throughout her life, though, Lézardière remained loyal to the Bourbons."
- In a discussion of Lézardière's work by Fauré, she says the volumes defended the monarchy because [Lézardière] saw it as a "moderating institution formed around a prince responsible for ensuring harmony between different parts of the French nation."
- In one of her own writings, published only in 1927, Lézardière wrote, "The independence of the parlement with regard to the arbitrary power of kings is, of all prerogatives, the most precious to citizens. The security and stability of the Nation's judges are those of the Nation itself."

== Selected works ==
- de Lézardière, Marie Charlotte Pauline Robert. Théorie des lois politiques de la monarchie française. Au comptoir des Imprimeurs-unis, 1844.
- Lézardière, Marie-Pauline, and Elie Carcassonne. Ecrits inedits de Mlle de Lézardière (Unpublished writings of Mlle Lézardière). Presses universitaires de France, 1927.
