= Canton of L'Île-d'Yeu =

Canton of France

Coordinates: 46.71°N 2.35°W

The canton of L'Île-d'Yeu is an administrative division of the Vendée department, western France. Its borders were not modified at the French canton reorganisation which came into effect in March 2015. Its seat is in L'Île-d'Yeu.

It consists of the following communes:

1. L'Île-d'Yeu
