= Mercury(II) hydride =

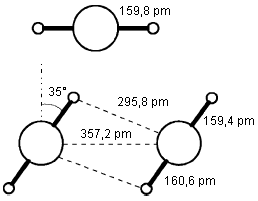
- computed structure of HgH2 and (HgH2)2

Names
- IUPAC name Mercury(II) hydride
- Other names Mercurane; Mercuric hydride

Identifiers
3D model (JSmol)	Interactive image
PubChem CID	19021138
- InChI: InChI=1S/Hg.2H Key: JUQLLZUJMFHASM-UHFFFAOYSA-N
- SMILES: [H][Hg][H]

Properties
Chemical formula	HgH_{2}
Molar mass	202.61 g mol^{−1}

Related compounds
Related compounds	Zinc hydride
- Except where otherwise noted, data are given for materials in their standard state (at 25 °C [77 °F], 100 kPa). Infobox references

Mercury(II) hydride (systematically named mercurane(2) and dihydridomercury) is an inorganic compound with the chemical formula HgH_{2} (also written as [HgH_{2}]). It is both thermodynamically and kinetically unstable at ambient temperature, and as such, little is known about its bulk properties. However, it can also be a white, crystalline solid, which is kinetically stable at temperatures below −125 °C (−193 °F), which was synthesized for the first time in 1951.

Mercury(II) hydride is the second simplest mercury hydride (after the significantly less stable mercury(I) hydride). Due to its instability, it has no practical industrial uses. However, in analytical chemistry, mercury(II) hydride is fundamental to certain forms of spectrometric techniques used to determine mercury content. In addition, it is investigated for its effect on high sensitivity isotope-ratio mass spectrometry methods that involve mercury, such as MC-ICP-MS, when used to compare thallium to mercury.

== Properties ==
=== Structure ===
In solid mercury(II) hydride, the HgH_{2} molecules are connected by mercurophilic bonds. Trimers and a lesser proportion of dimers are detected in the vapour. Unlike solid zinc(II), and cadmium(II) hydride, which are network solids, solid mercury(II) hydride is a covalently bound molecular solid. This is due to relativistic effects, which also accounts for the relatively low decomposition temperature of -125 °C.

The HgH_{2} molecule is linear and symmetric in the form H-Hg-H. The bond length is 1.646543 Å. The antisymmetric stretching frequency, ν_{3} of the bond is 1912.8 cm^{−1}, 57.34473 THz for isotopes ^{202}Hg and ^{1}H. The energy needed to break the Hg-H bond in HgH_{2} is 70 kcal/mol. The second bond in the resulting HgH is much weaker only needing 8.6 kcal/mol to break. Reacting two hydrogen atoms releases 103.3 kcal/mol, and so HgH_{2} formation from hydrogen molecules and Hg gas is endothermic at 24.2 kcal/mol.

=== Biochemistry ===
Alireza Shayesteh et al conjectured that bacteria containing the flavoprotein mercuric reductase, such as Escherichia coli, can in theory reduce soluble mercury compounds to volatile HgH_{2}, which should have a transient existence in nature.

== Production ==
=== Mercury(II) chloride reduction ===
Mercury(II) hydride may be prepared by the reduction of mercury(II) chloride. In this process, mercury(II) chloride and a hydride salt equivalent react to produce mercury(II) hydride according to the following equations, which depend on the stoichiometry of the reaction:

2 HgCl_{2} + 2 H^{−} → HgCl^{2−}_{4} + HgH_{2}
HgCl_{2} + 2 H^{−} → HgH_{2} + 2 Cl^{−}

Variations of this method exits where mercury(II) chloride is substituted for its heavier halide homologues.

=== Direct synthesis ===
Mercury(II) hydride can also be generated by direct synthesis from the elements in the gas phase or in cryogenic inert gas martices:

Hg → Hg^{*}
Hg^{*} + H_{2} → [HgH_{2}]^{*}
[HgH_{2}]^{*} → HgH_{2}

This requires excitation of the mercury atom to the ^{1}P or ^{3}P state, as atomic mercury in its ground-state does not insert into the dihydrogen bond. Excitation is accomplished by means of an ultraviolet-laser, or electric discharge. The initial yield is high; however, due to the product being in an excited state, a significant amount dissociates rapidly into mercury(I) hydride, then back into the initial reagents:

2 [HgH_{2}]^{*} → 2 HgH + H_{2}
2 HgH → Hg_{2}H_{2}
Hg_{2}H_{2} → 2 Hg + H_{2}

This is the preferred method for matrix isolation research. Besides mercury(II) hydride, it also produces other mercury hydrides in lesser quantities, such as the mercury(I) hydrides (HgH and Hg_{2}H_{2}).

== Reactions ==
Upon treatment with a Lewis base, mercury(II) hydride converts to an adduct. Upon treatment with a standard acid, mercury(II) hydride and its adducts convert either to a mercury salt or a mercuran(2)yl derivative and elemental hydrogen. Oxidation of mercury(II) hydride gives elemental mercury. Unless cooled below −125 °C (−193 °F), mercury(II) hydride decomposes to produce elemental mercury and hydrogen:

HgH_{2} → Hg + H_{2}

== History ==
Mercury(II) hydride was successfully synthesized and identified in 1951 by Egon Wiberg and Walter Henle, by the reaction of mercury(II) iodide and lithium tetrahydroaluminate in a mixture of petroleum ether and tetrahydrofuran. In 1993 Legay-Sommaire announced HgH_{2} production in cryogenic argon and krypton matrices with a KrF laser. In 2004, solid HgH_{2} was definitively synthesized and consequentially analysed, by Xuefeng Wang and Lester Andrews, by direct matrix isolation reaction of excited mercury with molecular hydrogen. In 2005, gaseous HgH_{2} was synthesized by Alireza Shayesteh et al, by the direct gas-phase reaction of excited mercury with molecular hydrogen at standard temperature; and Xuefeng Wang and Lester Andrews determined the structure of solid mercury HgH_{2}, to be a molecular solid.
