= Charles Gallet =

French lawyer and politician

- Born: 26 November 1875; Beauvoir-sur-Mer, Vendée, France
- Died: 1 November 1951 (aged 75); La Roche-sur-Yon, Vendée, France
- Occupations: Lawyer, politician

Charles Gallet (26 November 1875 – 1 November 1951) was a French lawyer and politician. He started his career as a lawyer in La Roche-sur-Yon. He served as a member of the Chamber of Deputies from 1928 to 1936, where he represented Vendée. He was succeeded by François Boux de Casson.
