= Hôtel de Ville, Challans =

Town hall in Challans, France

Hôtel de Ville
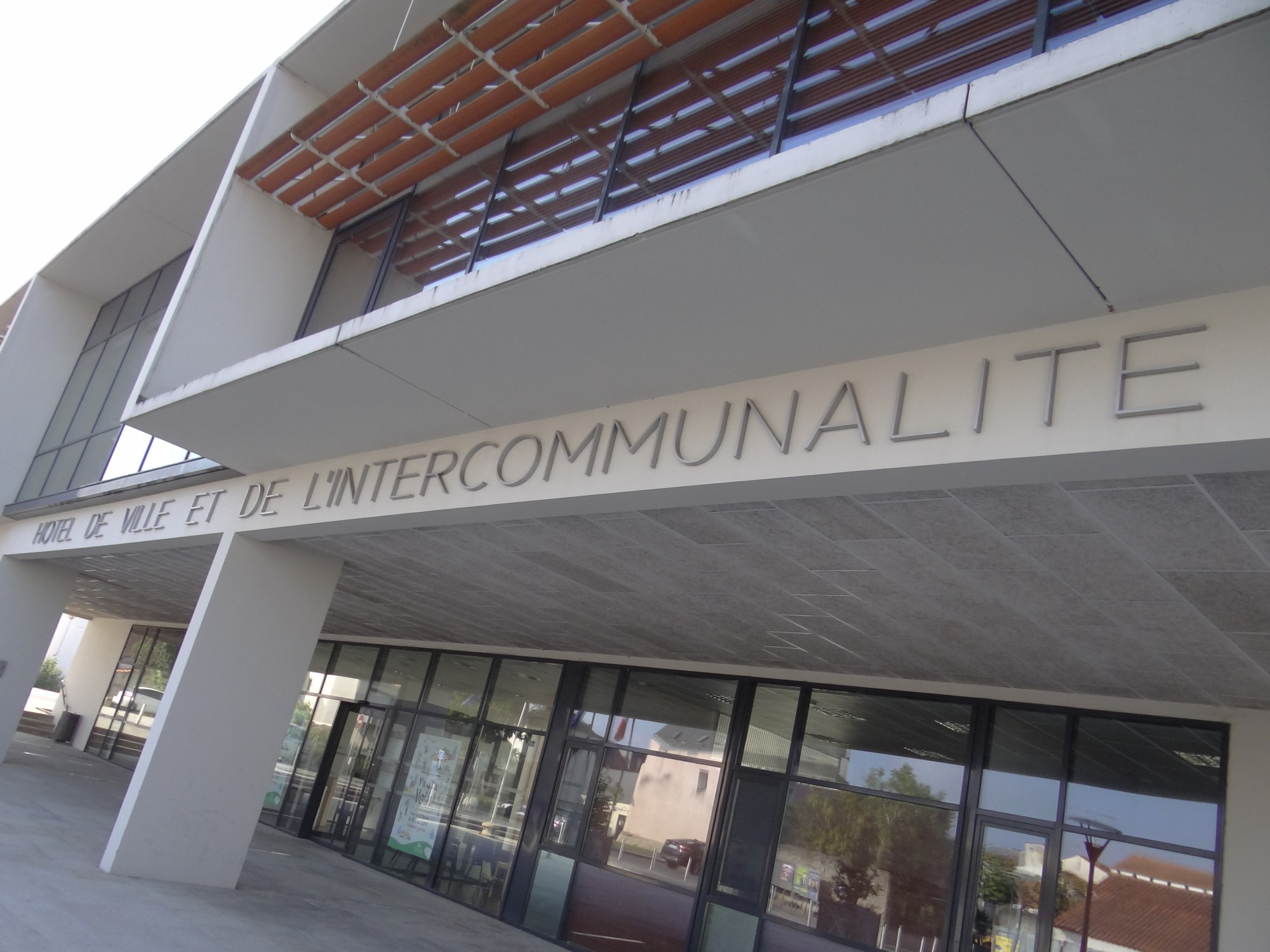
- The main frontage of the Hôtel de Ville in May 2019
- Interactive map of the Hôtel de Ville area

General information
- Type: City hall
- Architectural style: Modern style
- Location: Challans, France
- Coordinates: 46.8449°N 1.8793°W
- Completed: 2006

Design and construction
- Architect: Architectures – Chabanne et Scott

The Hôtel de Ville (French pronunciation: [otɛl də vil], City Hall) is a municipal building in Challans, Vendée, in western France, standing on Boulevard Lucien Dodin.

== History ==
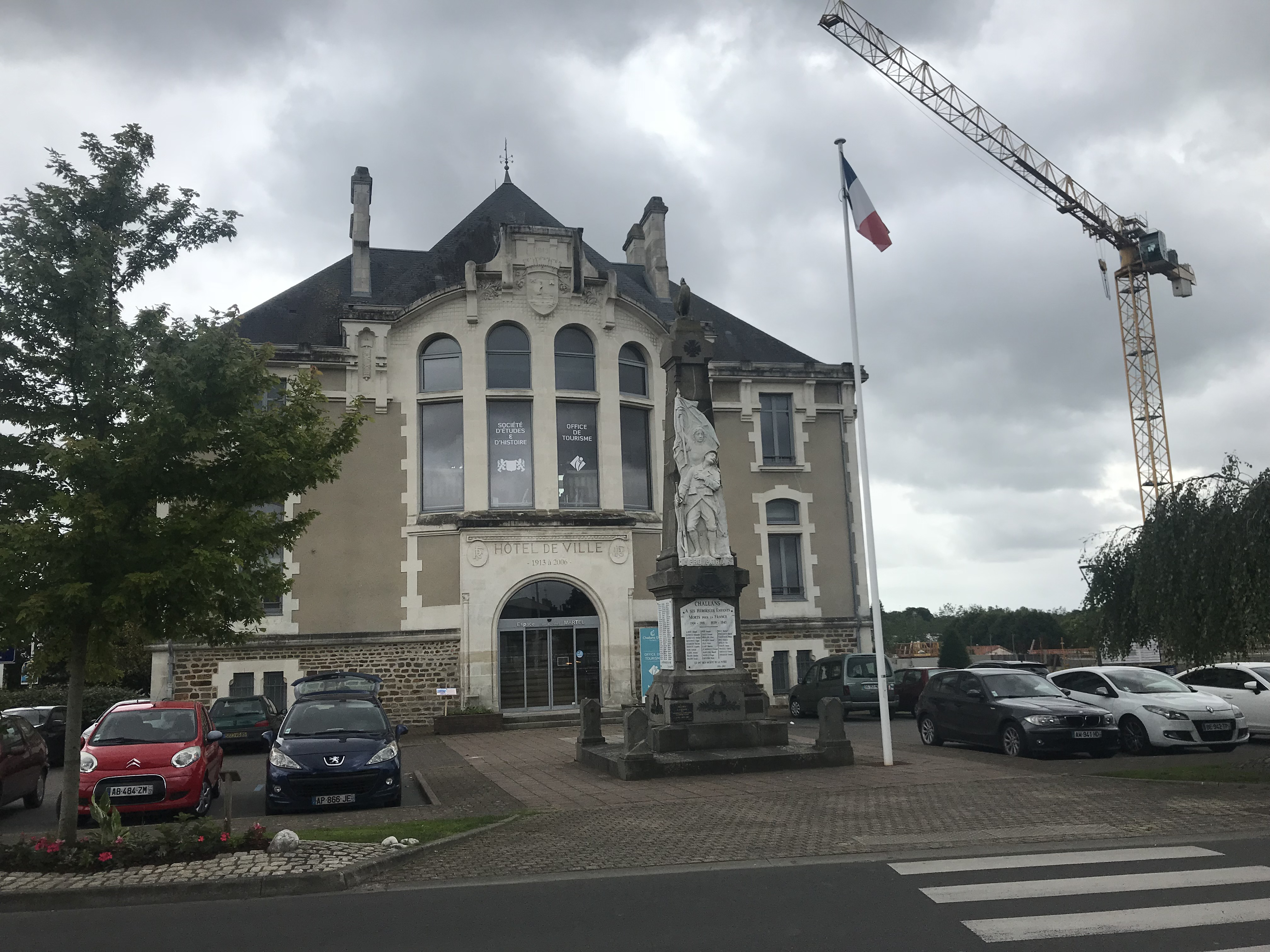
The second town hall

=== The first town hall ===
Following the French Revolution, meetings of the new town council were initially held in the home of the mayor at the time. This arrangement continued until the early 1830s, when the council decided to establish a combined town hall and school. The site they selected was on Route de La Garnache (now Rue du Général Leclerc). The building was designed in the neoclassical style, built in brick with a cement render finish and was completed in 1835. The design involved a symmetrical main frontage of five bays facing onto the street. The central bay contained a doorway while the rest of the building was fenestrated by casement windows. As well as a meeting room for the council and classrooms for children, the building contained a prison for incarcerating petty criminals.

After the building was no longer required for municipal use, it became the local post office.

=== The second town hall ===
In the early 20th century, following significant population growth, the council decided to establish a more substantial town hall. The site they selected was on the south side of what is now Place de la Mairie. The design involved a symmetrical main frontage of three bays facing onto the street. The central bay featured a round headed doorway with a stone surround on the ground floor, a large four-part bow window on the second floor, and a pediment containing a heraldic shield at roof level. The outer bays were fenestrated by bi-partite windows on the ground floor, and by casement windows above.

A war memorial in the form of an obelisk surmounted by a rooster was unveiled outside the town hall on 20 October 1922.

Following the occupation of the town by German troops from June 1940, during the Second World War, the occupying forces used the town hall as a command post, and it remained as such until the liberation of the town by the French Forces of the Interior on 24 September 1944. After the building was no longer required for municipal use, it became the local tourist office as well as the meeting place of the local history society. It was renamed the Espace Jan et Joël Martel in memory of two brothers, Jan and Joël Martel, who worked as sculptors and became founding members of Union des Artistes Modernes.

=== The third town hall ===
In the early 21st century, following further population growth, the council led by the mayor, Louis Ducept, decided to commission a modern town hall. The site they selected was on the north side of Boulevard Lucien Dodin, close to the second town hall. The new building was designed by Architectures – Chabanne et Scott in the modern style, built in concrete and glass at a cost of €4.6 million and was officially opened by prefect of Vendée, Christian Decharrière, on 20 October 2006.

The design involved a long main frontage facing onto Rue du Midi. The building was laid out in three sections, with the entrance in the central section. The first floor, which was projected out over the pavement, was supported by four large piers. On the first floor, the left-hand section featured a series of vertical slats, the central section was faced in plate glass, while the right-hand section was fronted by plate glass, which was divided by horizontal slats. Internally, the principal rooms were the Salle du Conseil (council chamber) and the Salle des Mariages (wedding hall). A bust of Marianne by the sculptor, Henry Murail, was installed in the wedding hall.
