= Château de La Vérie =

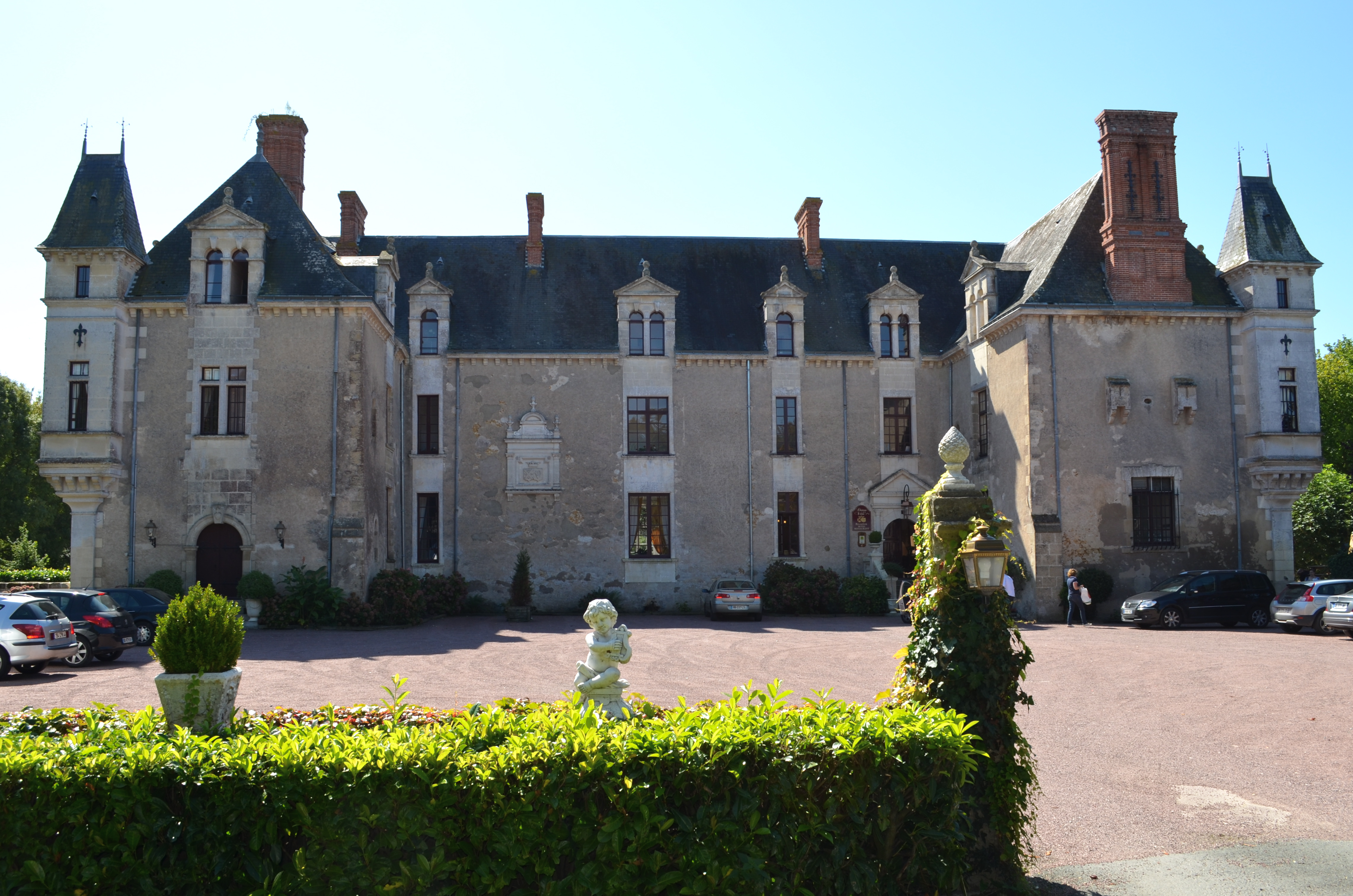
- Interactive map of the Château de La Vérie area

General information
- Type: Château
- Location: Challans, France
- Coordinates: 46°49′27″N 1°54′11″W
- Completed: 17th Century

The Château de La Vérie, also known as the Logis de La Vérie, is a château in Challans, Vendée, France. It was built in the 17th century. It has been listed as an official historical monument since 1964.
