= Mercury(I) hydride =

Names
- IUPAC name Mercury(I) hydride
- Other names: Mercurous hydride; Mercury monohydride

Identifiers
CAS Number	13966-62-6
3D model (JSmol)	Interactive image
ECHA InfoCard	100.240.785
PubChem CID	57348259
CompTox Dashboard (EPA)	DTXSID1024172
- InChI: InChI=1S/Hg.H Key: DJSHOLCMNYJYSS-UHFFFAOYSA-N
- SMILES: [Hg][H]

Properties
Chemical formula	HHg
Molar mass	201.600 g·mol^{−1}

Related compounds
Related compounds	Cadmium hydride
- Except where otherwise noted, data are given for materials in their standard state (at 25 °C [77 °F], 100 kPa). Infobox references

Mercury(I) hydride (systematically named mercury hydride) is an inorganic compound with the chemical formula HgH. It has not yet been obtained in bulk, hence its bulk properties remain unknown. However, molecular mercury(I) hydrides with the formulae HgH and Hg_{2}H_{2} have been isolated in solid gas matrices. The molecular hydrides are very unstable toward thermal decomposition. As such the compound is not well characterised, although many of its properties have been calculated via computational chemistry.

== Molecular forms ==
=== History ===
In 1979 and 1985, Swiss and Soviet chemical physicists independently determined that it is feasible to develop a mercury(I) hydride molecular laser.

=== Chemical properties ===
Mercury(I) hydride is an unstable gas and is the heaviest group 12 monohydride. In mercury(I) hydride, the formal oxidation states of hydrogen and mercury are −1 and +1, respectively, because of the electronegativity of mercury is lower than that of hydrogen. The stability of the diatomic metal hydrides with the formula MH (M = Zn-Hg) increases as the atomic number of M increases.

The Hg-H bond is very weak and therefore the compound has only been matrix isolated at temperatures up to 6 K (−267.15 °C; −448.87 °F). Mercury(II) hydride (HgH_{2}) has also been detected this way.

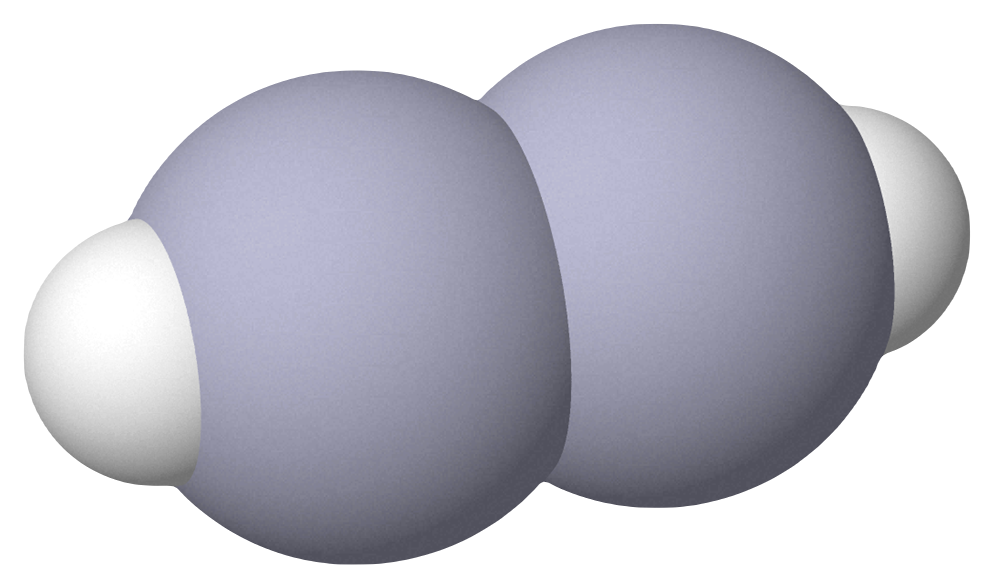
Dimercurane

A related compound is dimercurane(2), or bis(hydridomercury)(Hg–Hg), with the formula Hg_{2}H_{2}, which can be considered to be dimeric mercury(I) hydride. It spontaneously decomposes into the monomeric form.

==== Reactions ====
The mercury centre in mercury complexes such as hydridomercury can accept or donate a single electron by association:

HgH + R → HHgR

Because of this acceptance or donation of the electron, hydridomercury has radical character. It is a moderately reactive monoradical.
