= Île d'Yeu Aerodrome =

Coordinates: 46°43′03″N 002°23′33″W

Île d'Yeu Aerodrome Aérodrome d'Ile d'Yeu - Grand Phare
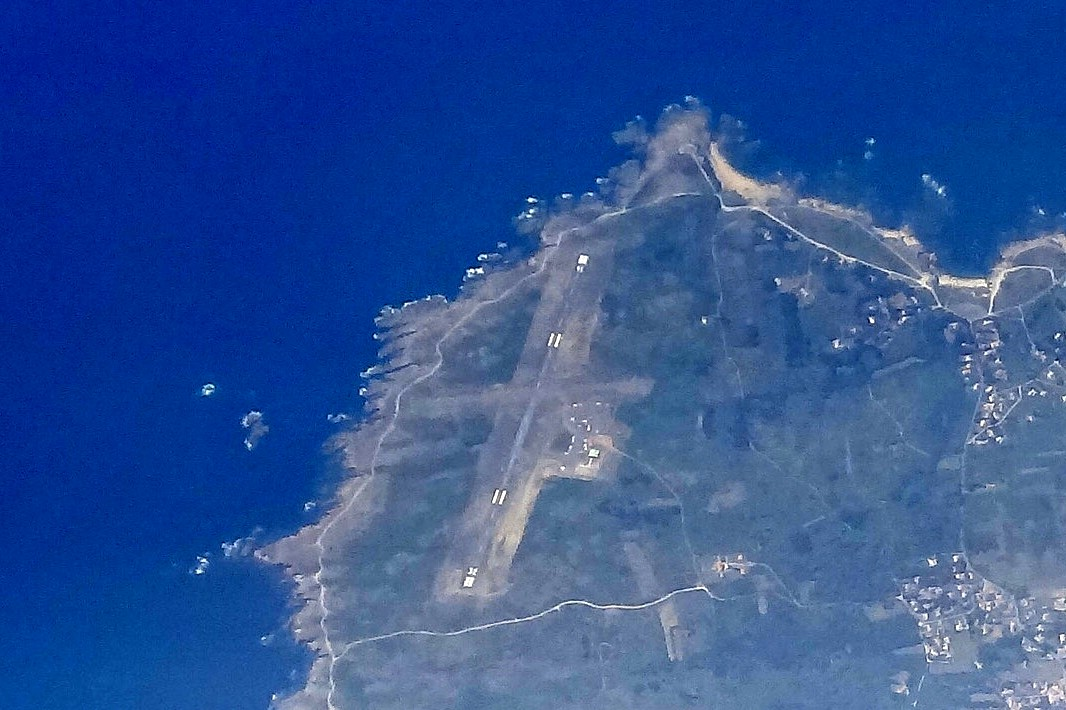
- IATA: IDY; ICAO: LFEY

Summary
- Airport type: Public
- Operator: CCI de la Vendée
- Serves: Île d'Yeu, France
- Elevation AMSL: 79 ft / 29 m

Map
- Location in Pays de la Loire LFEY (France)

Runways
Direction	Length		Surface
Direction	m	ft	Surface
14/32	1,230	4,035	Asphalt
04/22	575	1,886	Grass
- Source: French AIP

Île d'Yeu Aerodrome or Aérodrome d'Ile d'Yeu - Grand Phare (IATA: IDY, ICAO: LFEY) is an airport located 3.5 km west of Port-Joinville on the island of Île d'Yeu, a commune of the Vendée département in the Pays de la Loire région of France.

== Airlines and destinations ==
As of 19 September 2024, there are no regular commercial airline flights to/from Ile d'Yeu Aerodrome.
