= Île d'Yeu =

L'Île-d'Yeu
- Commune
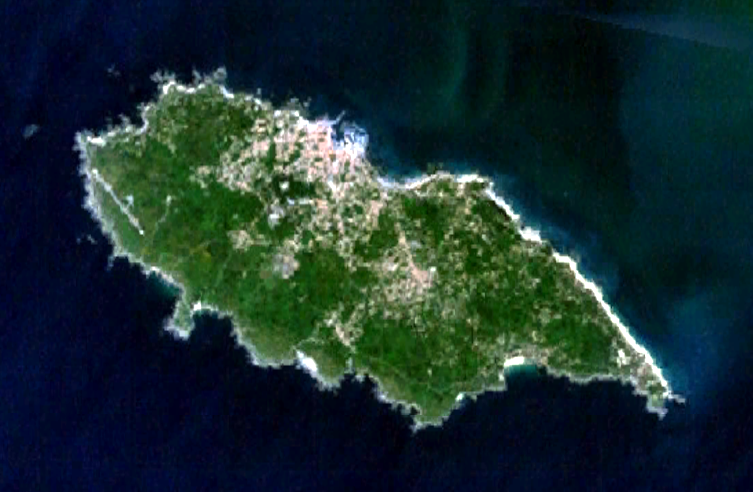
- A satellite image of the island

- Coat of arms
- Location of L'Île-d'Yeu
- Location within France Location within Pays de la Loire
- Coordinates: 46°43′30″N 2°20′49″W
- Country: France
- Region: Pays de la Loire
- Department: Vendée
- Arrondissement: Les Sables-d'Olonne
- Canton: L'Île-d'Yeu

Government
  - Mayor (2023–2026): Carole Charuau
- Area^{1}: 23.32 km^{2} (9.00 sq mi)
- Elevation: 20 m (66 ft)
- Highest elevation: 32 m (105 ft)
- Lowest elevation: 0 m (0 ft)
- Population (2019): 4,850
  - Density: 208/km^{2} (539/sq mi)
- Time zone: UTC+01:00 (CET)
  - Summer (DST): UTC+02:00 (CEST)
- INSEE/Postal code: 85113 /85350
- ^{1} French Land Register data, which excludes lakes, ponds, glaciers > 1 km^{2} (0.386 sq mi or 247 acres) and river estuaries.

Île d'Yeu (French pronunciation: [il djø]) or L'Île-d'Yeu, is an island and commune just off the Vendée coast of western France. The island's two harbours, Port-Joinville in the north and Port de la Meule to the south, in a rocky inlet of the southern granite coast, are famous for tuna and lobster fishing, respectively.

Administratively, the commune of L'Île-d'Yeu is part of the Vendée department and the Pays de la Loire region of France.

== History ==
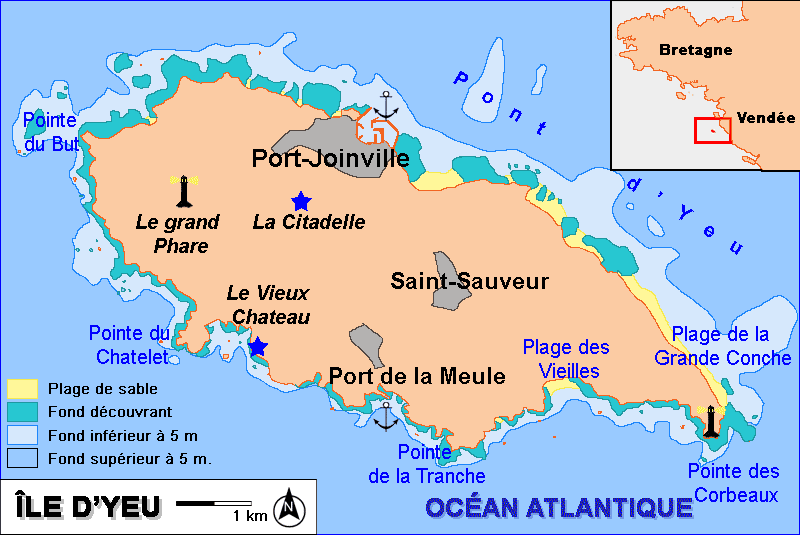

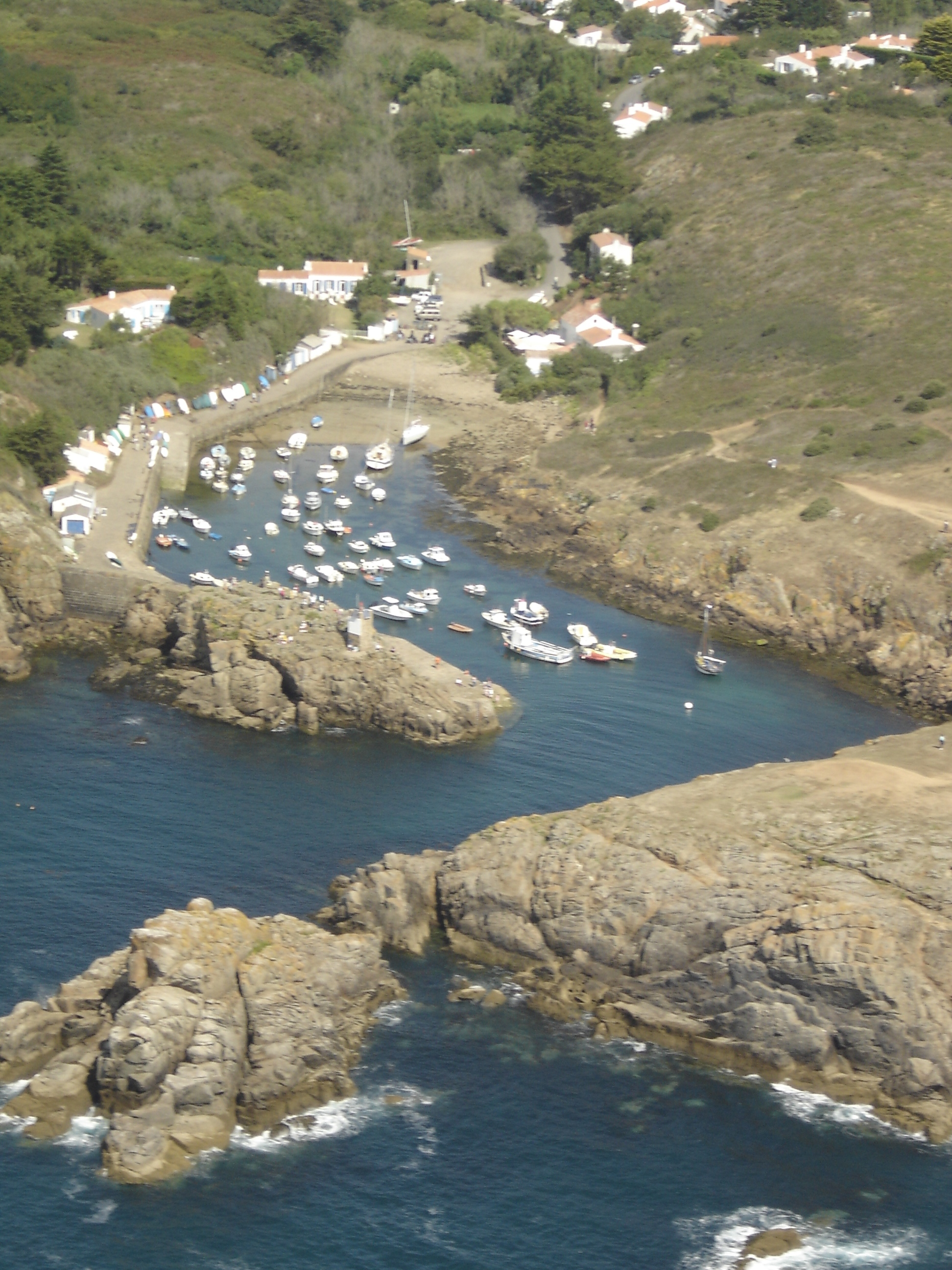
An aerial view of Port de la Meule

Neolithic markings in the native stone and an unusual concentration of megalithic dolmens and menhirs attest to the island's early sanctity.

Irish monks from Bangor, County Down, dedicated their monastery on the Île d'Yeu to Hilaire; Saint Amand from Poitou received early training there, but it was destroyed by Viking raiders in the ninth century. During the tenth century, monks from Marmoutier near Tours and monks of Saint-Cyprien at Poitiers built a new monastery and dedicated it to Saint Stephen.

A wooden stockade was built by the lords of Belleville to protect their maritime commerce in the area from pirates but this was eventually demolished and a stone castle built by Jeanne de Belleville and improved by her husband Olivier IV de Clisson. The castle, built on an islet linked to the coast by a bridge, is first mentioned in 1356.

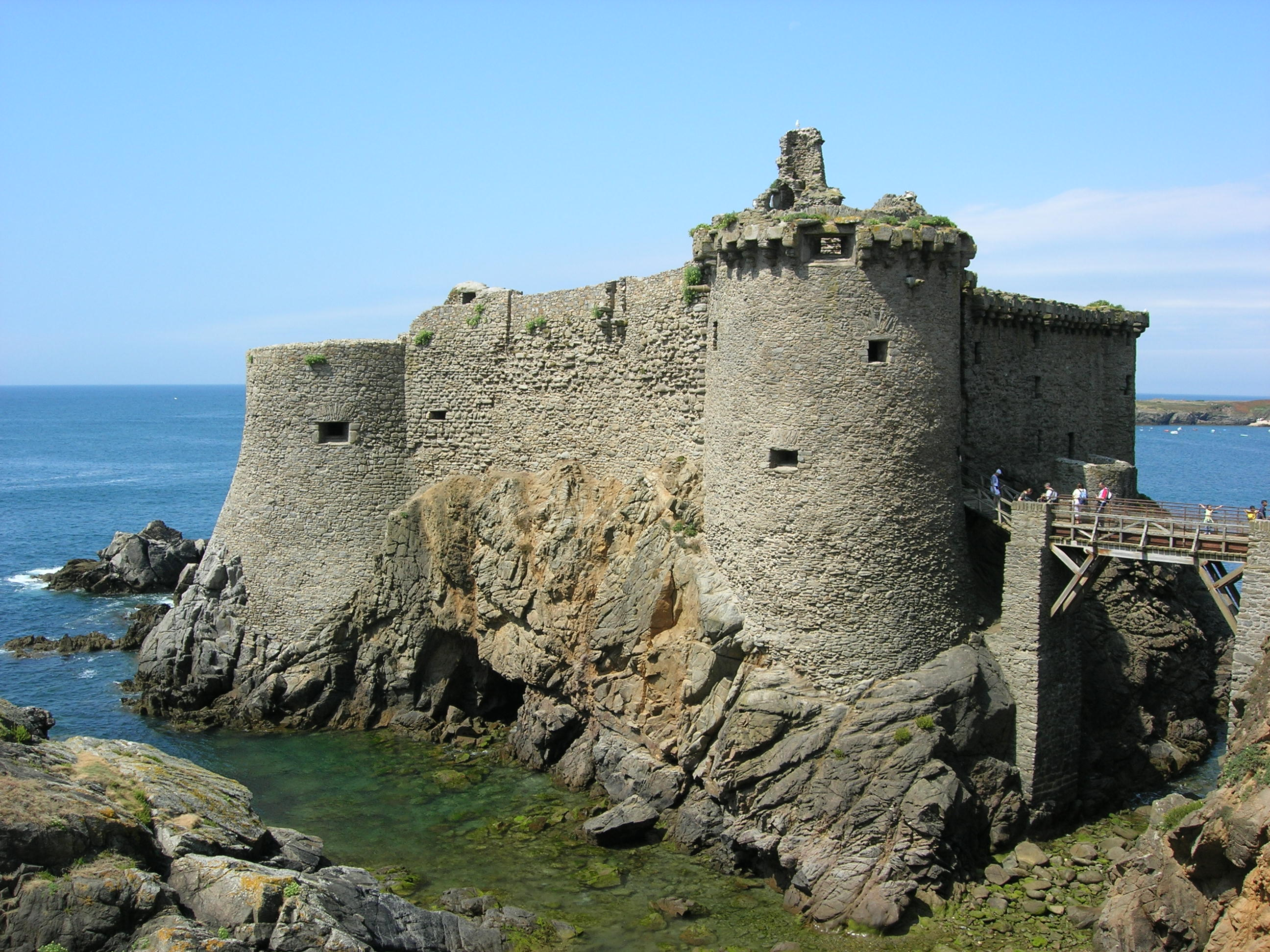
Île d'Yeu - Vieux château

Since the nineteenth century Île d'Yeu has attracted many artists. Jean Rigaud (1912–1999), official painter to the French Navy, had a house there, as did Maurice Boitel (1919–2007). Jean Dufy (1888–1964) made about twenty paintings of Île d'Yeu during several summer stays between 1926 and 1930.

The death sentence for treason of Philippe Pétain, the proclaimed hero of Verdun during World War I who later became the leader of France's wartime collaborationist Vichy régime, was immediately commuted to life imprisonment on Île d'Yeu. He died in a private home in Port-Joinville in 1951, and is buried in the local cemetery (Cimetière communal de Port-Joinville).

The poet Marc-Adolphe Guégan, an early French exponent of haiku, lived on the island until his death in 1959.

The island's seaweeds have been the subject of studies by the French marine biologist Françoise Ardré.

The children's author Ludwig Bemelmans, who summered on the island, took inspiration from a hospital stay after a bicycle crash for his first Madeline book, published in 1939.

Launched in 2020, Harmon'Yeu is France’s first two-year smart microgrid pilot, connecting 23 houses in Ker Pissot. The system integrates 23.7 kW of solar panels, a 15 kWh battery and six thermal water heaters.

== Population ==
Historical population
Year	Pop.	±% p.a.
1968	4,786	—
1975	4,766	−0.06%
1982	4,880	+0.34%
1990	4,941	+0.16%
1999	4,788	−0.35%
2007	4,906	+0.30%
2012	4,575	−1.39%
2017	4,809	+1.00%
2023	4,636	−0.61%
Source: INSEE

== Transport ==
The island is reached by ferry from Fromentine or Saint-Gilles-Croix-de-Vie. Air transportation is available at Île d'Yeu Aerodrome (IATA: IDY, ICAO: LFEY), with commercial service from Nantes Airport.

== Climate ==
Île d'Yeu has an oceanic climate (Köppen: Cfb) with mild weather year-round and significantly more precipitation in winter than in summer.

Comparison of local Meteorological data with other cities in France
Town	Sunshine (hours/yr)	Rain (mm/yr)	Snow (days/yr)	Storm (days/yr)	Fog (days/yr)
National average	1,973	770	14	22	40
Île d'Yeu	2,054	762.4	1.9	7.9	21.5
Paris	1,661	637	12	18	10
Nice	2,724	767	1	29	1
Strasbourg	1,693	665	29	29	56
Brest	1,605	1,211	7	12	75

Climate data for Île d'Yeu (1981−2010 normals, extremes 1949−present)
Month	Jan	Feb	Mar	Apr	May	Jun	Jul	Aug	Sep	Oct	Nov	Dec	Year
Record high °C (°F)	15.4 (59.7)	17.4 (63.3)	23.1 (73.6)	26.3 (79.3)	30.6 (87.1)	41.1 (106.0)	34.8 (94.6)	35.1 (95.2)	32.9 (91.2)	26.0 (78.8)	20.1 (68.2)	16.8 (62.2)	41.1 (106.0)
Mean daily maximum °C (°F)	9.7 (49.5)	9.9 (49.8)	12.2 (54.0)	14.4 (57.9)	17.6 (63.7)	20.5 (68.9)	22.6 (72.7)	22.9 (73.2)	20.9 (69.6)	17.2 (63.0)	13.2 (55.8)	10.4 (50.7)	16.0 (60.8)
Daily mean °C (°F)	7.5 (45.5)	7.4 (45.3)	9.4 (48.9)	11.2 (52.2)	14.3 (57.7)	17.1 (62.8)	19.0 (66.2)	19.3 (66.7)	17.4 (63.3)	14.5 (58.1)	10.8 (51.4)	8.2 (46.8)	13.0 (55.4)
Mean daily minimum °C (°F)	5.3 (41.5)	4.8 (40.6)	6.5 (43.7)	8.0 (46.4)	11.1 (52.0)	13.7 (56.7)	15.5 (59.9)	15.6 (60.1)	13.9 (57.0)	11.8 (53.2)	8.4 (47.1)	6.0 (42.8)	10.1 (50.2)
Record low °C (°F)	−9.8 (14.4)	−9.4 (15.1)	−7.1 (19.2)	0.0 (32.0)	2.8 (37.0)	5.4 (41.7)	9.1 (48.4)	10.0 (50.0)	5.5 (41.9)	1.8 (35.2)	−3.5 (25.7)	−7.9 (17.8)	−9.8 (14.4)
Average precipitation mm (inches)	83.7 (3.30)	62.3 (2.45)	57.9 (2.28)	57.8 (2.28)	57.7 (2.27)	40.0 (1.57)	38.0 (1.50)	36.9 (1.45)	61.9 (2.44)	91.9 (3.62)	91.6 (3.61)	90.1 (3.55)	769.8 (30.31)
Average precipitation days (≥ 1.0 mm)	13.2	10.3	10.4	10.1	9.4	6.7	7.3	6.2	8.1	12.3	13.5	13.9	121.3
Average relative humidity (%)	88	87	84	83	84	82	81	82	83	86	86	88	84.5
Mean monthly sunshine hours	74.7	111.2	149.2	201.3	231.2	252.5	274.7	260.3	195.5	137.6	94.0	72.1	2,053.8
Source 1: Meteo France
Source 2: Infoclimat.fr (humidity, 1961–1990)

== Gallery ==
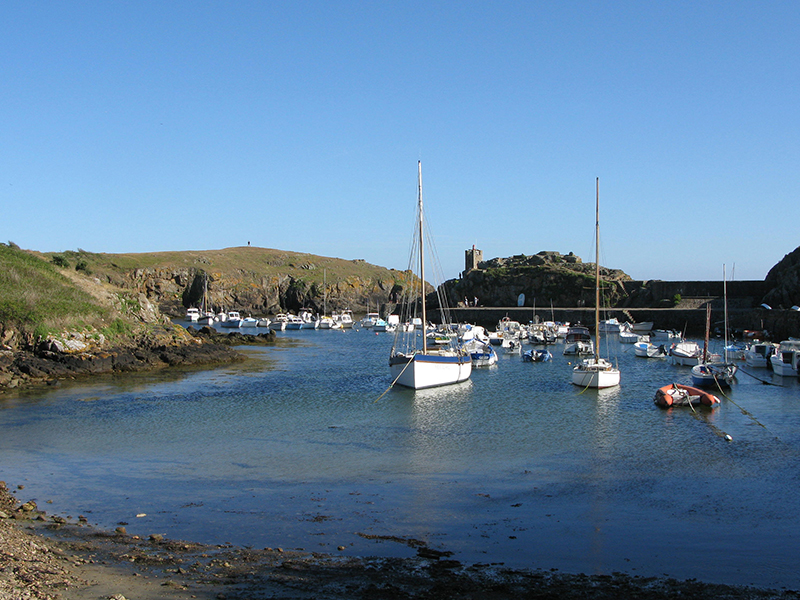
Le Port de la Meule (Stack Harbor)

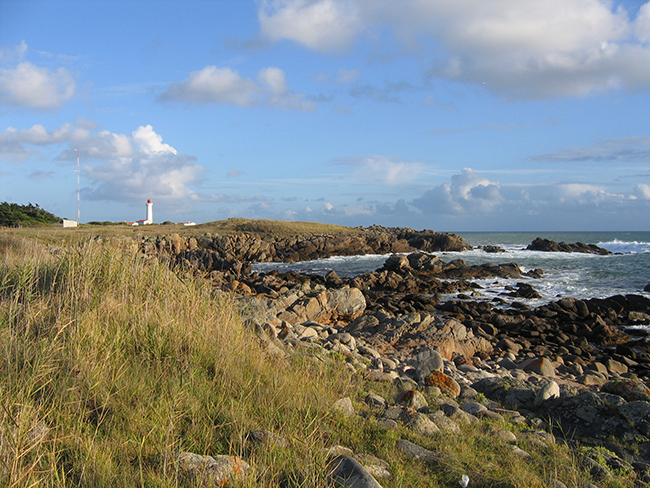
La pointe des Corbeaux (Crows' Edge)

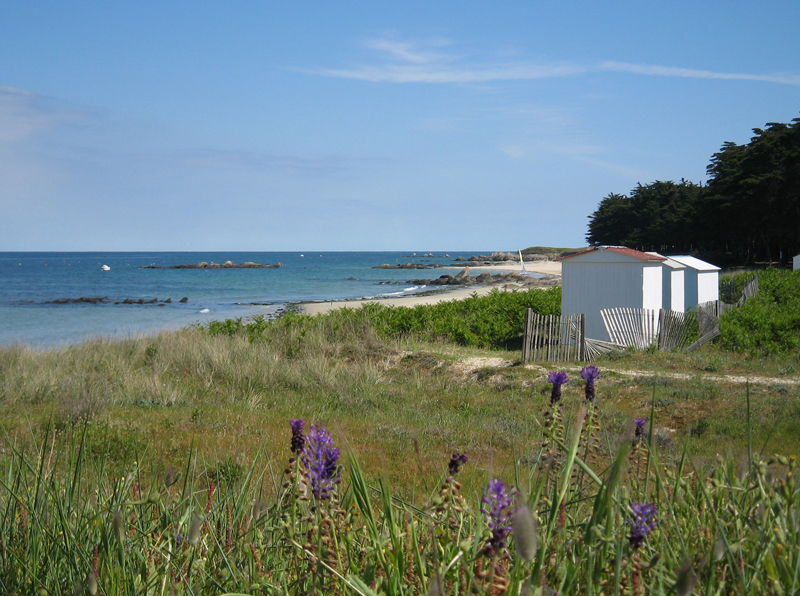
La plage des Sapins (Fir Tree Beach)

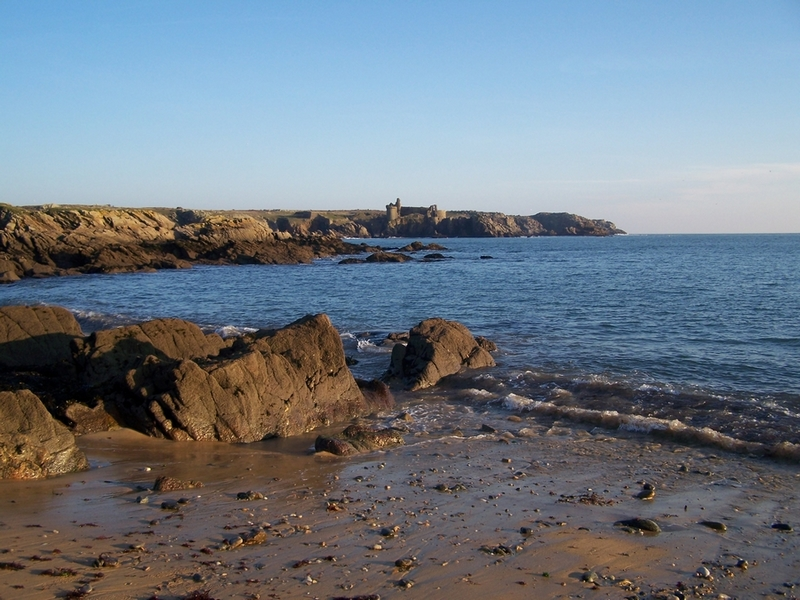
Beach with the Old Castle in the back

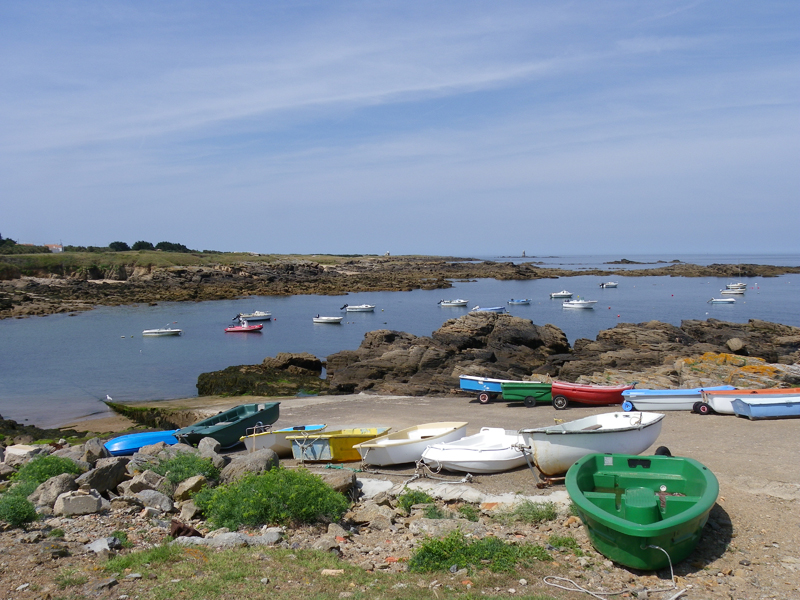
La pointe du But

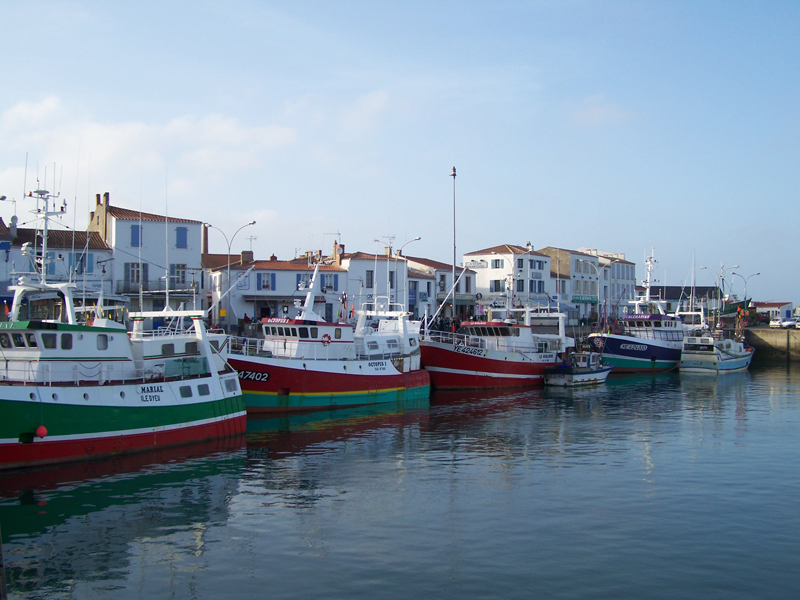
Port-Joinville

== See also ==
- Vieux-château de l'Île d'Yeu
- Communes of the Vendée department
- Theft of Philippe Pétain's coffin
