= Challans =

- Commune
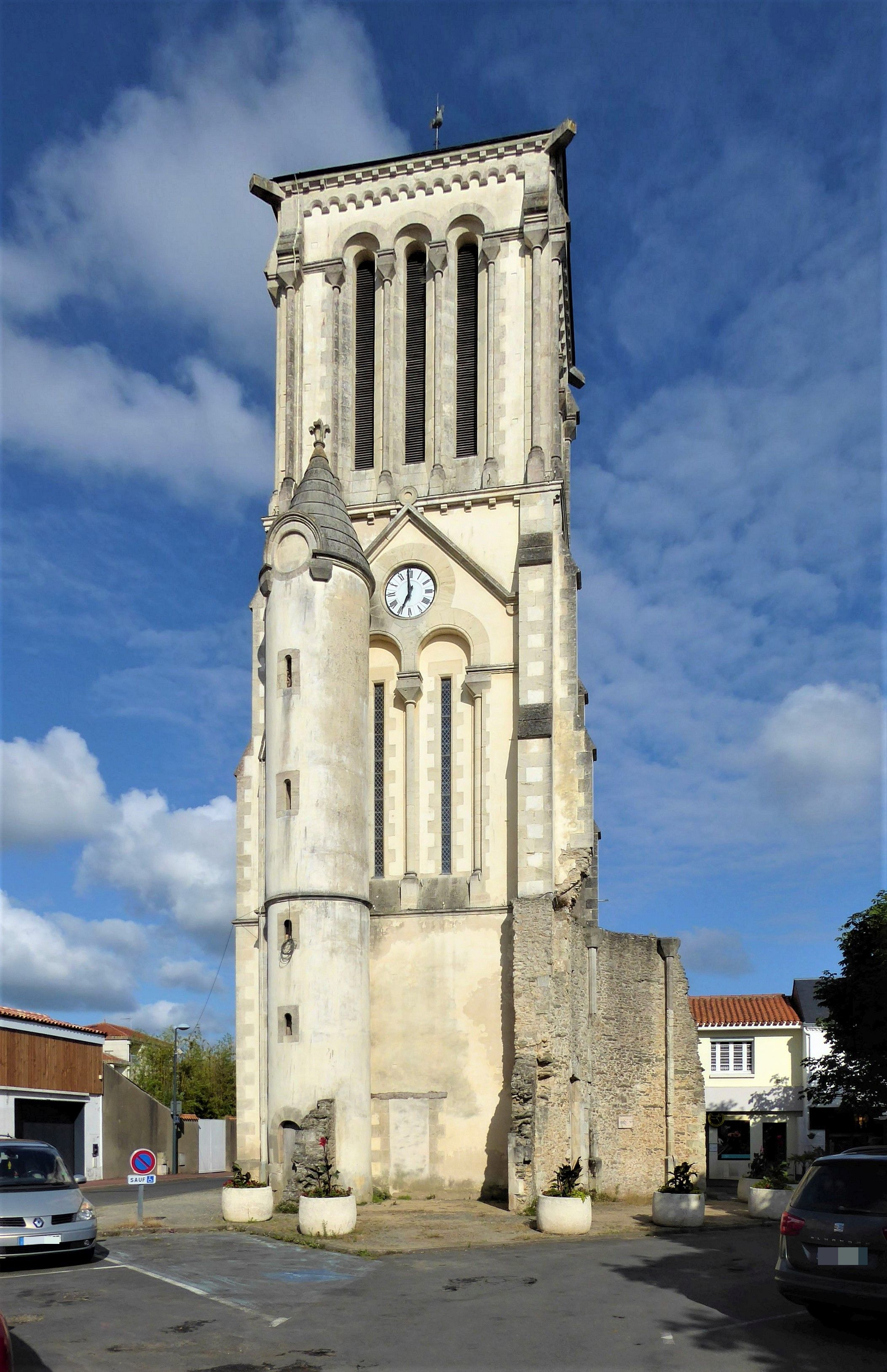
- The church tower in Challans

- Coat of arms
- Location of Challans
- Location within France Location within Pays de la Loire
- Coordinates: 46°50′48″N 1°52′41″W
- Country: France
- Region: Pays de la Loire
- Department: Vendée
- Arrondissement: Les Sables-d'Olonne
- Canton: Challans
- Intercommunality: Challans-Gois Communauté

Government
  - Mayor (2020–2026): Rémi Pascreau
- Area^{1}: 64.84 km^{2} (25.03 sq mi)
- Elevation: 11 m (36 ft)
- Highest elevation: 64 m (210 ft)
- Lowest elevation: 1 m (3.3 ft)
- Population (2023): 22,943
  - Density: 353.8/km^{2} (916.4/sq mi)
- Time zone: UTC+01:00 (CET)
  - Summer (DST): UTC+02:00 (CEST)
- INSEE/Postal code: 85047 /85300
- Website: challans.fr
- ^{1} French Land Register data, which excludes lakes, ponds, glaciers > 1 km^{2} (0.386 sq mi or 247 acres) and river estuaries.

Challans (French: [ʃalɑ̃]) is a commune in the Vendée department in the Pays de la Loire region in western France. Challans station has rail connections to Saint-Gilles-Croix-de-Vie and Nantes.

== History ==
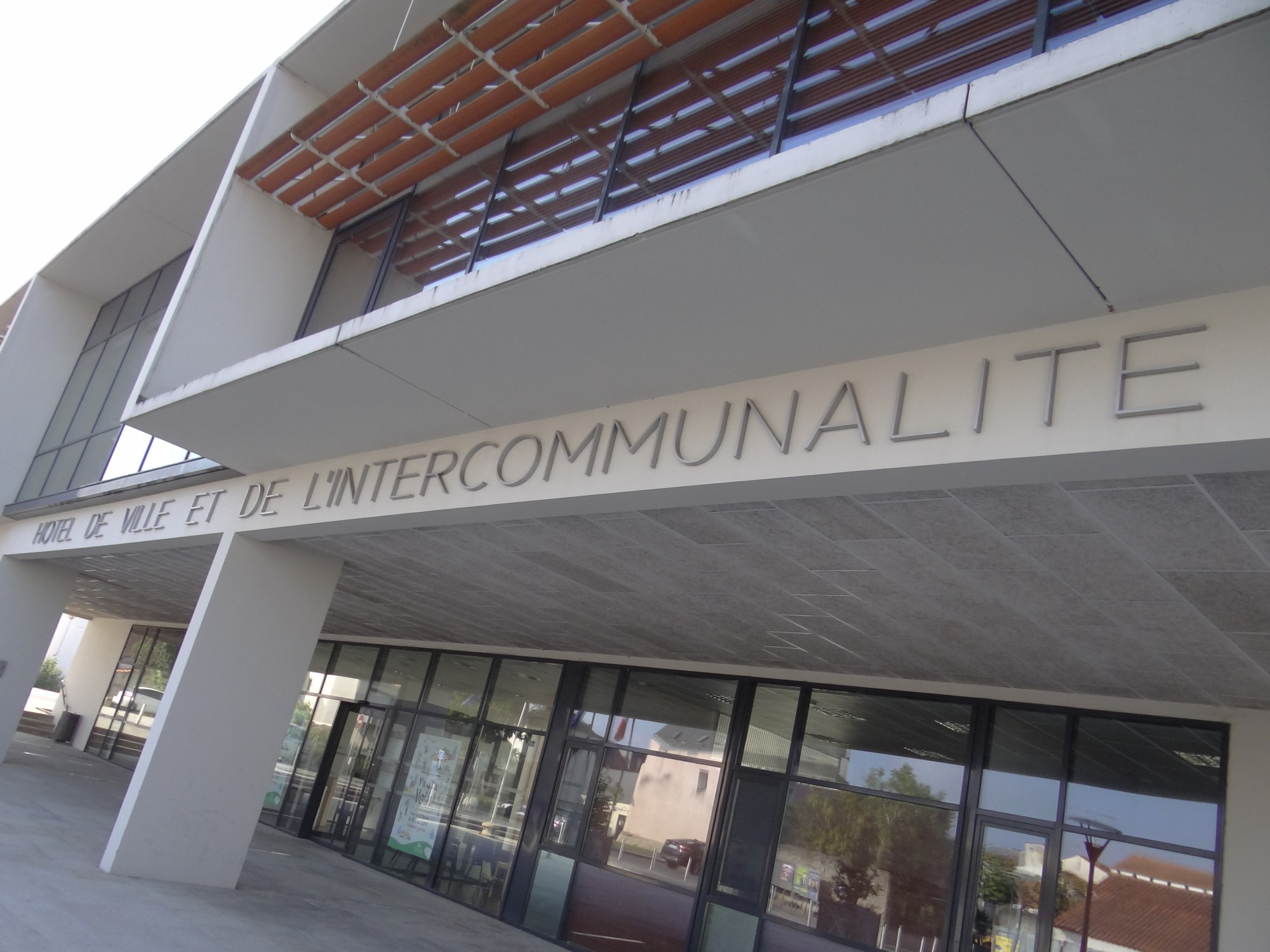
The Hôtel de Ville

The Hôtel de Ville was completed in 2006.

== Population ==
Historical population

Year	Pop.	±% p.a.
1793	2,500	—
1800	2,783	+1.54%
1806	2,928	+0.85%
1821	3,307	+0.81%
1831	3,288	−0.06%
1836	3,640	+2.05%
1841	3,832	+1.03%
1846	4,153	+1.62%
1851	4,135	−0.09%
1856	4,167	+0.15%
1861	4,178	+0.05%
1866	4,486	+1.43%
1872	4,631	+0.53%
1876	4,782	+0.81%
1881	4,917	+0.56%
1886	5,172	+1.02%
1891	5,274	+0.39%
1896	5,453	+0.67%
1901	5,508	+0.20%

Year	Pop.	±% p.a.
1906	5,463	−0.16%
1911	5,877	+1.47%
1921	5,407	−0.83%
1926	5,609	+0.74%
1931	5,469	−0.50%
1936	5,704	+0.84%
1946	5,643	−0.11%
1954	5,828	+0.40%
1962	6,962	+2.25%
1968	8,558	+3.50%
1975	11,794	+4.69%
1982	12,845	+1.23%
1990	14,203	+1.26%
1999	16,132	+1.43%
2007	18,035	+1.40%
2012	19,107	+1.16%
2017	20,622	+1.54%
2023	22,943	+1.79%

Source: EHESS and INSEE (1968-2023)

== Notable people ==
- Pauline de Lézardière, born in Challans, 25 March 1754, died Proustière Castle, Poiroux, 8 February 1835. Historian.
- Constance Picaud, born in Challans, 5 July 1998. Footballer for France.

== Twin towns ==
Challans is twinned with:

- Saronno, Italy (2004)

== See also ==
- Communes of the Vendée department
